= Alexander Cushing =

American lawyer

- Born: Alexander Cochrane Cushing; November 28, 1913; New York City, United States
- Died: August 19, 2006 (aged 92); Newport, Rhode Island, U.S.
- Education: Groton School; Harvard College; Harvard Law School
- Occupation: Lawyer
- Spouses: Justine Cutting (m. 1938; div. 1965) Elizabeth Woodward Pratt (m. 1970; died 1985) Nancy Wendt (m. 1987)
- Parent(s): Howard Gardiner Cushing; Ethel Cochrane

Alexander Cochrane Cushing (November 28, 1913 – August 19, 2006) was a lawyer who founded Squaw Valley Ski Resort in California.

== Early life ==
Alexander Cochrane Cushing was born on November 28, 1913, in New York City. He was the son of Howard Gardiner Cushing (1869–1916), a well-known artist who died when Cushing was three years old, and Ethel (née Cochrane) Cushing (1882–1948), who had poor health most of her life. His older sisters were Olivia Dulaney Cushing (1904–1908), and Lily Emmet Cushing (1909–1969), an artist. His older brother, Howard Gardiner Cushing Jr. (1906–1979), married Mary Callender Ames (1908–1982), daughter of Frederick Lothrop Ames Jr.

In 1925, his mother remarried to James Denison Sawyer (1875–1943), a Wall Street stock broker. As a child, he lived at a home on East 70th Street, in a house designed by his godfather, William Delano.

His paternal grandparents were Robert Maynard Cushing (1836–1907), a wealthy Boston tea merchant who was a son of John Perkins Cushing (1787–1862), and Olivia (née Dulany) Cushing. His uncle was Grafton Dulaney Cushing. His maternal grandparents were Alexander S. Cochrane (1840–1919), and Mary Lynde (née Sullivan) Cochrane (1851–1918). His maternal aunt, Margaret Cochrane, married F. Murray Forbes, a Boston banker. His first cousin, Alexander Cochrane Forbes was married to Irene Helen Robbins, the daughter of Warren Delano Robbins.

Due to the early death of his father and his mother's health issues, Cushing spent much of his young life at boarding school, attended the Groton School, graduated from Harvard University in 1936, and then Harvard Law School three years later in 1939.

== Career ==
Following his graduation from law school, he practiced for three years, working at the U.S. State Department, upon the recommendation of Groton classmate, Stewart Alsop, and briefly at the Department of Justice in Washington, D.C., where he argued a case before the United States Supreme Court. He left public service and then worked at Davis Polk.

Following the bombing of Pearl Harbor, he enlisted in the U.S. Navy and was a member of the first officer training class at Quonset Point. During the War, he served with the Naval Air Transport Service in South America and the Pacific for five years, eventually retiring as a Lieutenant Commander upon the end of the War.

After his service, he returned to the practice of law, with Davis Polk in New York City, for nine months following the war.

=== Squaw Valley ===
During a ski vacation to Sierra Nevada, Cushing visited Squaw Valley, which is seven miles from the north shore of Lake Tahoe. He decided that its possibilities as a ski resort were great, so he went into partnership to develop it with Wayne Poulsen, a pilot and former champion skier who had purchased much of the valley's land, 640 acres (2.6 km^{2}), in the 1940s from Union Pacific Railroad and first showed it to him. Cushing invested $145,000 of his own money, as well as $275,000 from Laurance Rockefeller and other investors, and founded the Squaw Valley Ski Resort in 1949.

Beginning in 1954, Cushing began lobbying the International Olympic Committee to host the eighth Winter Olympics entirely at Squaw Valley. He eventually won his bid, and Squaw Valley hosted the 1960 Winter Olympics, beating out the well established St. Moritz, Switzerland, and Innsbruck, Austria. Due to his efforts, he was on the cover of Time magazine in 1959.

Squaw Valley is one of the largest ski areas in the United States and is the second-largest ski area in Lake Tahoe with 3,600 acres (15 km^{2}) and the only funitel in the U.S. attracting approximately 600,000 skiers a year.

== Personal life ==
Cushing was married three times. His first marriage was in 1938 to Justine Bayard Cutting (1918–2003), the daughter of Dr. Robert Bayard "Fulton" Cutting (1886–1967) and Mary Josephine Armory (1887–1971). Her father was a first cousin of Justine Bayard Cutting Ward (1879–1975). Her grandfather, Robert Cutting (1852–1934), was the brother of William Bayard Cutting (1850–1912) and the son of Elise Justine Bayard (1823–1853), and served as the president of Cooper Union School of Architecture and Engineering and chairman of the Metropolitan Opera Association. Before their divorce in 1965, they had three daughters together: Justine Bayard Cushing, a decorator; Lily Cushing, who married Janek Kunczynski, who founded Lift Engineering; and Alexandra Olivia Cochrane Cushing, who married Philip King Howard, an attorney with Covington & Burling and the son of Rev. John R. Howard, in 1972. Howard is a descendant of Josiah Bartlett, a signer of the Declaration of Independence.

His second marriage was to Elizabeth Ogden (née Woodward) Pratt (1907–1985), the daughter of William Woodward Sr. (1876–1953) and Elizabeth Ogden "Elsie" Cryder (1882–1981), and the sister of William Woodward Jr. (1920–1955). She was first married to Robert Livingston Stevens Jr. (1907–1972). After their divorce in 1935, he married Grace Vanderbilt (d. 1964). Her second marriage was to John Teele Pratt Jr. (1903–1969), which lasted until his death in 1969.

In 1985, while she was providing legal counsel regarding development land issues at the base of Squaw Valley, he met his third and final wife, Nancy R. Wendt. They married in 1987 and remained married to until his death in 2006. Wendt, who had also spent her third year of law school at Harvard, received her law degree from the University of South Carolina in 1975.

Cushing died on August 19, 2006, at his summer home in Newport, Rhode Island.

=== Descendants ===
His granddaughter, Charlotte Iris Cushing Howard, married Daniel Robert Osnoss, both graduates of Yale, in 2012.

=== Honors ===
In 1999, Cushing was inducted into the Ski Industry Hall of Fame for his lifetime contribution to the sport.
