= Margaret de Crussol d'Uzès =

Oil heiress (1932–1977)

Margaret, Duchess d'Uzès
- Born: Margaret Wright Bedford; October 18, 1932; New York City, U.S.
- Died: October 16, 1977 (aged 44); France
- Education: Chapin School; Miss Porter's School
- Spouses: Thomas Moore Bancroft Jr. (m. 1951; div. 1960) Prince Charles d'Arenberg, 3rd Duke of Arenberg (m. 1960; died 1967) Emmanuel de Crussol, 15th Duke of Uzès (m. 1968; died 1977)
- Children: 2
- Parent(s): Frederick Henry Bedford Jr. Margaret Wright Stewart

Margaret Wright "Peggy" de Crussol, Duchess d'Uzès (née Bedford, formerly Bancroft and d'Arenberg) (October 18, 1932 – October 16, 1977) was an American‐born oil heiress who married three times, first to an American textile and banking heir, second to a Duke of Arenberg, and third to the premier Duke of France.

== Early life ==
Margaret, who was known as Peggy to her friends, was born in New York City on October 18, 1932. She was the only child of Frederick Henry Bedford Jr. and Margaret Wright (née Stewart) Bedford. Her father was a director of the Standard Oil Company of New Jersey (today known as Exxon). She grew up between her family's estate in Greens Farms, Connecticut and their apartment in the Pierre Hotel in Manhattan.

Her paternal grandparents were Jane (née Dingee) Bedford and Frederick Henry Bedford Sr. (a director of Standard Oil of New Jersey from 1911 to 1926). Her maternal grandparents were William Lincoln Stewart and Edna (née Wright) Stewart.

Peggy attended the Chapin School in New York City followed by Miss Porter's School in Farmington, Connecticut. In 1950, she was presented to society at a dance given by her parents at the Creek Club in Locust Valley, as well as at a Junior League ball.

== Personal life ==
On April 15, 1951, she was married to Thomas Moore Bancroft Jr. (1930–2019), at St. James' Episcopal Church in Manhattan with a reception in the ballroom of the Colony Club. Thomas, a graduate of the Middlesex School and Princeton University, was the son of Edith W. Bancroft and Thomas M. Bancroft Sr. His maternal grandfather was banker William Woodward Sr. and his uncle was William Woodward Jr. A textile executive, he served as president of Mount Vernon Mills, and raised and raced thoroughbred horses with his brother. After their marriage, they bought a duplex apartment on the 15th and 16th floors of 740 Park Avenue where Peggy lavishly entertained. Before their divorce in Alabama in May 1960, they were the parents of:

- Margaret "Muffie" Woodward Stewart Bancroft (b. 1952), who married Charles Minot Amory Jr. in 1971. They divorced and she later married W. Stephen Murray.

After their divorce, Bancroft remarried two more times, secondly to Melissa Weston, and thirdly to Barbara (née Symmers) Wiedemann (former wife of George Stanhope Wiedemann III) in 1977.

=== Second marriage ===
On December 29, 1960, she was married to Prince Charles Auguste Armand d'Arenberg (1905–1967) in a quiet ceremony in Massachusetts. Charles, a Prince of the Holy Roman Empire who was 27 years her senior, was the son of Prince Charles Louis Pierre d'Arenberg and Antoinette Hélène Emma Louise de Gramont de Lesparre, and grandson (and heir) of Prince Auguste Louis Albéric d'Arenberg, 2nd Duke of Arenberg (the cadet branch which had been granted the dukedom in 1827 in the French peerage). After the marriage, she was known as Her Serene Highness, Princess d'Arenberg, Duchess of Arenberg and they lived at the d'Arenberg residence in Paris and Peggy again became a popular hostess. Together, they were the parents of:

- Prince Pierre Frederick Henri d'Arenberg (b. 1961), 4th Duke of Arenberg, twice married, three daughters.

In Fall 1966, after five years of marriage, Peggy filed for divorce from Prince Charles, who counter-sued charging Peggy with adultery and claiming she had four lovers. During the divorce, she continued to live in the same residence as him. After informing the press that she wouldn't be in New York for the season because she was fighting the custody charges, she made an exception to attend Truman Capote's famous Black and White Ball in November. Her husband died, unexpectedly, in June 1967, at the age of 62. Peggy proclaimed the couple had reconciled and the divorce had been called off shortly before he died. The Prince's family gave her a generous allowance and guaranteed her son's inheritance rights under the condition she immediately leave the d'Arenberg residence, which she did.

=== Third marriage ===
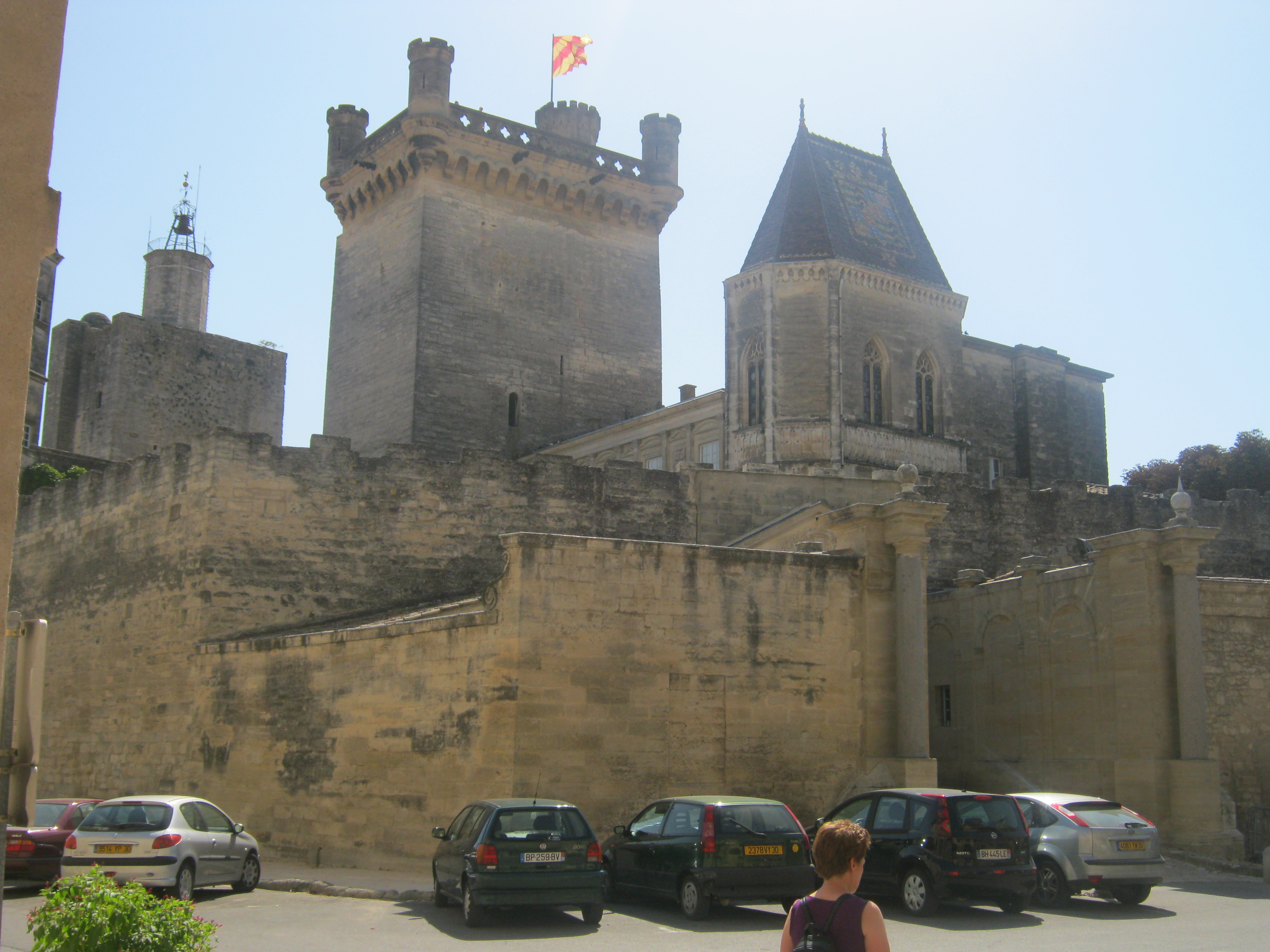
The Château du Duché in Uzès

On July 12, 1968, she was married to Emmanuel Jacques de Crussol, Duke d'Uzès (1927–1999) at the Villa Taylor in Morocco by the Pasha of Marrakesh, and witnessed by Man Singh II (the Maharaja of Jaipur) and the Countess de Breteuil. He was heir to the oldest and premier dukedom in France which had been created by King Charles IX in 1565. Technically, it was a "higher" title (because most ancient) than her previous marriage but this is real only in France because her second husband was a German Duke too, a Serene Highness and a member of a (former) Sovereign House, a Sovereign Duchy created in 1644 (and 3rd Duke of Arenberg in French Peerage). Emmanuel, a grandson of the 14th Duke, had been briefly married to another American, Carolyn Baily Brown of North Carolina (a sister of producer David Brown) from 1946 to 1947, and was the son of Duke of Crussol and the former Evelyn Anne Gordon of London.

After their marriage, they lived in the Duke's homes in Paris, Rabat, and the town of Uzès, where she paid to restore the family's ancestral castle, the Château du Duché. She returned to New York in 1969 for the "Fan Ball" as the ball chairman.

=== Death ===
The Duchess d'Uzès was killed in an early morning automobile accident a few days shy of her 45th birthday. She was en route back to her home in Paris after attending a ball at the home of real estate developer Robert de Balkany near Rambouillet, southwest of Paris. Of the four passengers, she was the only death; the two men in the car, one of whom was driving, escaped with slight injuries, while Geneviève Françoise Poncet (mother of the debutante for whom the ball was given) suffered several broken ribs. Poncet was the former wife of Robert de Balkany, who was then married to Princess Maria Gabriella of Savoy, daughter of Umberto II, the last King of Italy. Her husband, The Duke d'Uzes, was in Morocco, where he worked as a chemical engineer, at the time of the accident. Her funeral service was held at St. James' Episcopal Church in New York City on October 24, 1977, followed by entombment in the Bedford family mausoleum.
