= Edith W. Bancroft =

American racehorse owner and breeder

Edith Bancroft
- Born: Edith Woodward; October 8, 1905; Manhattan, New York
- Died: November 4, 1971 (aged 66); Old Brookville, New York
- Known for: Thoroughbred racehorse owner & breeder
- Spouse: Thomas Moore Bancroft (m. 1929; died 1970)
- Children: 2
- Parent(s): William Woodward Sr. Elsie Ogden Cryder

Edith Woodward Bancroft (October 8, 1905 – November 4, 1971) was an American owner and breeder of Thoroughbred racing horses best known for breeding and racing Damascus, the 1967 American Horse of the Year and a 1974 National Museum of Racing and Hall of Fame inductee who was ranked 16th in the 1999 Blood-Horse magazine List of the Top 100 Racehorses of the 20th Century. Among others, Edith Bancroft bred Cloudy Dawn, who won the Arlington Handicap and Dwyer Stakes and ran third to winner Riva Ridge in the 1972 Belmont Stakes.

== Early life ==
The eldest of the four daughters of William Woodward Sr. and Elsie Ogden Cryder. Her younger sisters were Elizabeth Ogden Woodward (wife of married Robert Livingston Stevens, John Teele Pratt Jr. (a son of John Teele Pratt), and Squaw Valley Ski Resort founder Alexander Cochrane Cushing); Sarah Woodward (wife of Charles Arthur Moore III, and Marshall Christopher Sewall); and Ethel Woodward (wife of Philippe de Croisset). a son of French playwright Francis de Croisset, Her only brother, William Woodward Jr. was shot and killed by his wife Ann, reportedly thinking him a burglar. She later committed suicide in 1975, after Truman Capote published a story that "depicted her as a murderous vamp."

== Thoroughbred racing ==
Edith Bancroft's father was president and a major shareholder of Hanover National Bank who also owned Belair Stud, one of the most important breeding and racing operations in the history of American Thoroughbred racing. As part of winning twelve American Classics races, under William Woodward Sr., Belair won each of the Kentucky Derby and the Preakness Stakes three times and the Belmont Stakes six times. On two occasions their horse swept the U.S. Triple Crown. Five Belair horses were voted into the National Museum of Racing and Hall of Fame and William Woodward Sr. was inducted as one of the "Pillars of the Turf in 2016."

=== Pen-Y-Bryn Farm ===
While her only brother William Woodward Jr. had inherited Belair Stud, Edith Bancroft's sons, William Woodward Bancroft and Thomas Moore Bancroft Jr. would continue the family tradition of breeding and racing Thoroughbreds. Following the passing of their mother, in 1971 the brothers began operating under the nom de course Pen-Y-Bryn Farm. Among their successful horses were Highland Blade, Honorable Miss, Zen, Bailjumper and Cloudy Dawn, the latter bred by their mother.

== Personal life ==
In 1929, Edith married textile executive Thomas Moore Bancroft. Together, they were the parents of two sons:

- Thomas Moore Bancroft Jr. (1930–2019), who married Standard Oil heiress Margaret Wright Bedford in 1951. They divorced in 1960 and he married Melissa Weston, and thirdly to Barbara (née Symmers) Wiedemann (former wife of George Stanhope Wiedemann III) in 1977.
- William Woodward Bancroft (1932–2003)

Bancroft died in Old Brookville on November 4, 1971.
