= Feud: Capote vs. The Swans =

Season 2 of Feud

- Season 2
- Promotional poster
- Starring: Naomi Watts; Diane Lane; Chloë Sevigny; Calista Flockhart; Demi Moore; Molly Ringwald; Treat Williams; Joe Mantello; Russell Tovey; Tom Hollander
- No. of episodes: 8

Release
- Original network: FX
- Original release: January 31 – March 13, 2024

Season chronology
- ← Previous; Feud: Bette and Joan

Feud: Capote vs. The Swans is the second season of the American anthology television series Feud created by Ryan Murphy, Jaffe Cohen, and Michael Zam for FX. The eight-episode season is based on the book Capote's Women: A True Story of Love, Betrayal, and a Swan Song for an Era written by Laurence Leamer. The TV series adaptation was written by playwright Jon Robin Baitz. Gus Van Sant directed six episodes, while Max Winkler and Jennifer Lynch directed one each. Its first two episodes premiered on January 31, 2024, with episodes available on Hulu the day after broadcast on FX.

== Premise ==
Acclaimed writer Truman Capote ruins his friendships with "the Swans", a group of high society ladies, by writing a thinly veiled fictionalized account of their scandalous and hedonistic lives in his planned novel, Answered Prayers. When Esquire publishes the chapter "La Côte Basque 1965", after the restaurant of the same name frequented by "the Swans" and Capote himself, several vow to ruin his life in revenge.

== Cast ==
=== Main ===
- Tom Hollander as Truman Capote, the esteemed author of La Côte Basque, 1965, a story with deep and long-lasting consequences for New York elite society—in particular the group of socialites known as "the Swans".
- Treat Williams as Bill Paley, the adulterous husband of Babe Paley.
- Joe Mantello as Jack Dunphy, Capote's longest-lasting boyfriend, who got him into rehab.
- Russell Tovey as John O'Shea (Note: Despite being credited for all episodes, he's only in three), Capote's abusive side-piece with a "heterosexual dominance" complex.

==== The Swans ====
- Naomi Watts as Babe Paley, a socialite and former Vogue editor, as well as Capote's best friend.
- Diane Lane as Slim Keith, a foul-mouthed socialite and fashion icon with a disdain for Capote.
- Chloë Sevigny as C. Z. Guest, a WASP socialite and author, as well as one of the last "Swans" to remain friends with Capote.
- Calista Flockhart as Lee Radziwill, a socialite and the younger sister of Jackie Kennedy.

Two other "Swans", Princess Marella Agnelli and Gloria Guinness, do not make appearances in the series.

=== Recurring ===
- Jessica Lange as Lillie Mae Faulk, Capote's mother, and a great source of Capote's trauma. The eventual actions leading to Capote's betrayal of the "Swans" link back to her hatred of high society women, because she never got to be one.
- Ella Beatty as Kerry O'Shea, O'Shea's estranged daughter and Capote's protégée, and Kate Harrington in the last episode.
- Demi Moore as Ann Woodward, a socialite and radio actress accused of murdering her own husband.
- Molly Ringwald as Joanne Carson, a show host and Capote's final martyr.

=== Historical figures ===
Feud: Capote vs. The Swans features appearances by a number of writers, socialites, filmmakers, and other historical figures of the period, including:

- Jeffrey Emerson as Andy Warhol, a leading figure in the New York art scene.
- Gregory North as Leland Hayward, a Broadway and film producer.
- Pawel Szajda as Albert Maysles, a filmmaker documenting high society that filmed the fictional documentary, "Masquerade 1966".
- Yuval David as David Maysles, a filmmaker and Albert's brother and collaborator.
- Rebecca Creskoff as Happy Rockefeller, a philanthropist and wife of 41st vice president of the United States, Nelson Rockefeller.
- David Healy as Nelson Rockefeller, 41st vice president of the United States.
- Tom Stratford as Bill Blass, a famous fashion designer and Capote's old friend.
- Marin Ireland as Katharine Graham, a lead publisher of The Washington Post, her family's newspaper.
- Chris Chalk as James Baldwin, a civil-rights activist, acclaimed author, and Capote's contemporary and friend.
- Charlotte Cronin as Cornelia Guest, the daughter of C.Z. Guest, a socialite and advocate for veganism and animal rights.
- J. Richey Nash as Winston Guest, the husband of C.Z. Guest and a polo champion.
- Jeffrey Grover as Richard Avedon, a fashion photographer and old friend of Lillie Mae Faulk.
- Dennis Staroselsky as Stanley Siegel, host of The Stanley Siegel Show.
- Jamie Askew as Jennifer Jones, an actress and health-advocate.
- Scott Zimmerman as David Selznick, a producer and screenwriter of Capote's short stories adapted to the big screen.
- Alison Wright as Pamela Harriman, a socialite with a multitude of suitors, as well as the US ambassador to France, who was often considered another of Truman's "Swans".

== Episodes ==
No. overall	No. in season	Title	Directed by	Written by	Original release date	Prod. code	U.S. viewers (millions)
9	1	"Pilot"	Gus Van Sant	Jon Robin Baitz	January 31, 2024	3WBB01	0.461
In 1968, Babe Paley tells Truman Capote that her husband Bill is having an affair. In 1955, Truman accompanies the Paleys and film producer David O. Selznick on a trip to Montego Bay, during which he charms them with witticisms and an outrageous story that Ann Woodward murdered her husband. After dinner, Babe tells Truman about her husband's affairs, which he tells her to use to her advantage. In 1975, Truman meets banker John O'Shea in a bathhouse and takes him to lunch with Babe, Slim Keith, and C. Z. Guest at La Côte Basque. Ann confronts Truman, but he is unmoved. O'Shea suggests Truman use his friends' lives as inspiration for his next novel, Answered Prayers. Despite attempts to dissuade him by Jack Dunphy, Truman's erstwhile partner, an excerpt is published in Esquire, with many recognizing it as a thinly veiled attack. Babe tells Bill she has been diagnosed with cancer. While lunching with Babe, Slim reveals Ann committed suicide before the excerpt's publication and suggests exacting revenge on Truman.
10	2	"Ice Water in Their Veins"	Gus Van Sant	Jon Robin Baitz	January 31, 2024	3WBB02	0.263
A few months following the scandalous article being published, Truman's downward spiral begins. Following Ann's suicide, the Swans decide to present a unified front as they set in motion a plan of revenge against Truman.
11	3	"Masquerade 1966"	Gus Van Sant	Jon Robin Baitz	February 7, 2024	3WBB03	0.298
In a documentary of 1966, Capote has cameras filming as he sets up for a Masquerade. Despite various times asking to not have their private issues shown on camera, the camera crew continues filming. In the background, Capote claims to be inviting a special guest, causing the women to guess unsuccessfully the identity. At the party, Ann Woodward and her son party crash with her wanting him to stop his smear campaign. At the end of the evening, Capote hallucinates dancing with his deceased mother.
12	4	"It's Impossible"	Gus Van Sant	Jon Robin Baitz	February 14, 2024	3WBB04	0.259
Babe continues her radiation therapy at Memorial Sloan Kettering Cancer Center, but receives unfortunate news about its progress. As she faces a harsh reality, Babe forgives her husband of his indiscretions and hints at forgiving Truman to the dismay of Slim. Slim tries to slander Truman in the press while the rest of the Swans discourage her efforts. Truman completes his stint at rehab, but quickly relapses and returns to John O'Shea and his old habits.
13	5	"The Secret Inner Lives of Swans"	Max Winkler	Jon Robin Baitz	February 21, 2024	3WBB05	0.342
In 1975, Babe reads the Esquire article and argues with Bill about his lack of discretion in choosing his lovers. Despondent from a conversation with Bill Paley, Truman tries to commit suicide. He receives a phone call from James Baldwin, with whom he is acquainted, and James invites him to lunch at La Côte Basque. James offers Truman emotional support and encourages him to get sober. As they discuss behaviors of wild swans and compare them to the negative and hurtful behaviors of Truman's Swans, Truman recalls salacious details he did not include in the article. Truman awakens the next day (from his suicide attempt) in the same clothes he wore before the day with Baldwin, implying that the meeting has been a dream, and continues writing his book. That evening after telling Jack this is his best writing ever, he eats a roasted swan by candlelight.
14	6	"Hats, Gloves and Effete Homosexuals"	Gus Van Sant	Jon Robin Baitz	February 28, 2024	3WBB06	0.281
Truman advises the professional styling of Kate Harrington, the daughter of John O'Shea who he has taken under his wing as a protégé, and pressures her to mimic the look of Babe for her upcoming photoshoot with Richard Avedon. Both Lee and Dick encourage Kate to not allow Truman to control her image. Kate loves and admires Truman, but grows disillusioned with his irresponsible lifestyle and resumed alcoholism. Meanwhile, both Truman and the Swans struggle with their advancing ages and fading relevance in the social scene as their favorite stores and fashions become outdated. Truman takes a boorish repairman as a brief lover, only to find the affair unfulfilling. Entrenched in the threat of a lawsuit from Gore Vidal, who he had defamed on television, Truman elects to undergo plastic surgery and later resumes writing, wistfully recalling happier times with the Swans.
15	7	"Beautiful Babe"	Jennifer Lynch	Jon Robin Baitz	March 6, 2024	3WBB07	0.297
An increasingly frail Babe learns that she has only six months to live and makes peace with her mortality. She dies in the summer, surrounded by her family, and has a dying vision of reuniting with Truman, whom she praises as being one of the greatest and most important relationships in her life. The Swans attend her funeral, from which Truman has been banned, and begin to go their separate ways. Truman, grieving Babe and regretting their failure to reconcile, slips further into alcoholism and drug abuse, culminating in a disastrous and incoherent appearance on Stanley Siegel's talk show. Jack cuts ties with him and leaves him with Joanne Carson, Truman's only remaining friend. Joanne tries to support Truman's writing efforts, but Truman instead continues to drink heavily as his health declines. He hallucinates Babe comforting him as he dies of organ failure, and Joanne informs Jack that Truman's final words were "Beautiful Babe".
16	8	"Phantasm Forgiveness"	Gus Van Sant	Jon Robin Baitz	March 13, 2024	3WBB08	0.307
In 1984, Truman visits Babe's grave and lies down on top of it, longing to be reunited. He later visits Jack's apartment while pursuing sobriety, and the two reconcile and part ways as Truman vows to finish Answered Prayers as an apology to his former friends. As he writes, he envisions himself reconciling with the Swans by selflessly granting their deepest wishes. Between chapters, he has a vision of his combative mother, which drives him back to drinking and using drugs. During one such episode, he recalls her suicide, and hallucinates Ann, who informs him that Answered Prayers will never restore his friendships, as he wrote it with the intent of destroying high society out of revenge for himself and his shunned mother. He destroys the completed manuscript in secret and departs for his final stay with Joanne. In 2016, Truman's ashes are sold at auction for $45,000 (with Kate Harrington in attendance) as the ghosts of the Swans critique the proceedings.

== Production ==
=== Development ===
FX renewed the Feud series for a second season in February 2017, with Ryan Murphy and Jon Robin Baitz attached as writers, with an initial focus on the relationship between the then Charles, Prince of Wales and Diana, Princess of Wales.

By April 2022, the focus had shifted onto Truman Capote and his tempestuous relationship with New York high society with Gus Van Sant on board to direct and Naomi Watts attached to star.

Baitz adapted the bestselling book Capote's Women by Laurence Leamer for the series. Executive producers on the series include Murphy, Alexis Martin Woodall, Baitz, Van Sant, Dede Gardner, Jeremy Kleiner, Watts, Eric Kovtun, and Scott Robertson.

It was the last project of Treat Williams before his death in 2023.

=== Casting ===
In August 2022, Tom Hollander was cast as Truman Capote with the cast also including Diane Lane and Calista Flockhart. In September 2022, Demi Moore joined the cast.

=== Filming ===
Filming began in New York in the autumn of 2022.

== Release ==
=== Broadcast ===
The first two episodes of Feud: Capote vs. The Swans premiered on January 31, 2024. The series debuted at 10 p.m. ET/PT on FX, with a special Director's Cut of the first episode simulcast on FXX. In Canada, the season debuted on FX on Wednesday, January 31, at 10 p.m. ET / 7 p.m. PT, simultaneously with the U.S. broadcast.

=== Streaming ===
Episodes of Feud: Capote vs. The Swans were made available for streaming on Hulu the day after their FX broadcast. Internationally, the show was made available for streaming on Disney+ via the Star hub and on Star+ in Latin America.

The series debuted at No. 1 on Hulu's "Top 15 Today"—a daily updated list of the platform's most-watched titles—on its first full day of release. JustWatch, a guide to streaming content with access to data from more than 20 million users around the world, estimated that the show was the sixth most-streamed series in the U.S. for the week of February 5–11. The streaming aggregator Reelgood, which monitors real-time data from 5 million users in the U.S. for original and acquired streaming programs and movies across subscription video-on-demand (SVOD) and ad-supported video-on-demand (AVOD) services, calculated that the series was the eighth most-streamed television show in the U.S. during the week of February 4. It climbed to the third most-streamed show the following week, before moving to the ninth spot by February 21.

== Reception ==
=== Critical response ===
On Rotten Tomatoes, Feud: Capote vs. The Swans holds an approval rating of 77% based on 64 reviews. The website's critics consensus reads, "While this Feud might lack the abundance of incident that made its predecessor such a nasty delight, Capote vs. the Swans' luxe milieu and dynamite ensemble will keep spectators entertained." On Metacritic, the season has a weighted average score of 70 out of 100, based on 33 critics, indicating "generally favorable" reviews.

David Bianculli of NPR praised the season, concluding that Capote vs. the Swans merits attention for its quality. Bianculli described it as a strong drama with a compelling story and a powerhouse cast, noting that the actors deliver particularly powerful performances in this installment of Feud. Alison Herman of Variety commended the show's portrayal of the "complex, enduring, often co-dependent bond between straight women and gay men." Herman described the series as a sincere and moving exploration of this dynamic, a rarity treated with empathy and depth. Herman noted that this unique focus helps make the show's flaws more forgivable, viewing them as part of its ambitious storytelling.

Benjamin Lee of The Guardian awarded Capote vs. the Swans four out of five stars and praised it for its thoughtful approach, crediting the shift away from Charles and Diana. Lee commended the performances of Tom Hollander, Naomi Watts, and Chloë Sevigny, as well as the show's exploration of the emotional toll on high society figures. While the expected cattiness is present, Lee found the series more focused on the poignant relationships between Capote and his female friends. Despite some minor flaws in pacing, Lee concluded that the second season surpasses the first by emphasizing melancholy over meanness.

Carol Midgley of The Sunday Times awarded Capote vs. the Swans four out of five stars and found it to be a visually stunning and sharply written series that, while too long at nearly eight hours, is elevated by Tom Hollander's mesmerizing portrayal of Truman Capote. Hollander's performance, marked by his convincing physical transformation and voice work, captures Capote's descent into alcoholism, drug abuse, and self-destruction. Midgley also praised Naomi Watts as Babe Paley, highlighting the cast's strong performances. Though the series explores rich people's self-obsession, Midgley found that Hollander's nuanced portrayal brings depth and pathos to Capote’s tragic decline. Emma Fraser of IGN rated Capote vs. The Swans eight out of ten, praising the actors' performances, particularly that of Hollander. Fraser also complimented the show's costumes and production design, describing it as a "delicious cautionary tale of writing.

Jackson McHenry of Vulture noted that Capote vs. the Swans offers plenty of surface-level details about Capote, highlighting his public persona, but struggles to delve into his creative inner life. McHenry observed that while the show delivers on the cattiness, glamour, and intriguing facts—such as Capote serving spaghetti and chicken hash with champagne—it falls short in providing deeper insight into why Capote's social circle was so groundbreaking or how 1960s society was evolving during that time. Melanie McFarland of Salon observed that the female characters in Baitz's script lacked depth, noting that the writing focuses heavily on one layer of the women's interiority, primarily portraying their vindictiveness, prejudice, or selfishness, without suggesting deeper dimensions. She also critiqued comparisons made by FX and the show to The Real Housewives franchise, arguing that this comparison undermines the cast's efforts. McFarland pointed out that while Bravo's housewives may appear as shallow as Capote’s socialites, Andy Cohen excels at turning problematic personalities into captivating spectacles. In contrast, Baitz and the cast overwork the characters, making them appear rigid rather than allowing them the flexibility to be authentically wicked.

=== Ratings ===
The series premiere on January 31, 2024, drew 461,000 viewers (P2+) with a 0.15% rating, including 92,300 viewers aged 18–49 (0.07% rating). Later episodes showed fluctuating viewership, with the March 13, 2024 episode attracting 307,000 total viewers (0.10% rating) and 262,500 household viewers (0.21% rating). The 18–49 demographic for that episode was 52,500 viewers (0.04% rating). Viewership across the show ranged from 259,000 to 461,000 total viewers (0.08% to 0.15% ratings), while household ratings varied between 131,000 and 287,500 viewers (0.19% to 0.23%). The 18–49 demographic audience remained mostly steady, ranging between 39,600 and 79,500 viewers.

== Accolades ==
Year	Award	Category	Nominee(s)	Result	Ref.
2024	Dorian TV Awards	Campiest TV Show	Feud: Capote vs. The Swans	Nominated	
2024	Dorian TV Awards	Best TV Movie or Limited Series	Feud: Capote vs. The Swans	Nominated	
2024	Dorian TV Awards	Best TV Performance - Drama	Tom Hollander	Nominated	
2024	Location Managers Guild Awards	Outstanding Locations in a TV Serial Program, Anthology, MOW, or Limited Series	Feud: Capote vs. The Swans	Nominated	
2024	Primetime Creative Arts Emmy Awards	Outstanding Original Main Title Theme Music	Feud: Capote vs. The Swans	Nominated	
2024	Primetime Creative Arts Emmy Awards	Outstanding Hairstyling	Feud: Capote vs. The Swans	Nominated	
2024	Primetime Creative Arts Emmy Awards	Outstanding Casting for a Limited or Anthology Series or Movie	Feud: Capote vs. The Swans	Nominated	
2024	Primetime Creative Arts Emmy Awards	Outstanding Makeup (Non-Prosthetic)	Feud: Capote vs. The Swans	Nominated	
2024	Primetime Creative Arts Emmy Awards	Outstanding Period Costumes	Feud: Capote vs. The Swans	Won	
2024	Primetime Emmy Awards	Outstanding Directing for a Limited or Anthology Series or Movie	Gus Van Sant	Nominated	
2024	Primetime Emmy Awards	Outstanding Lead Actor in a Limited or Anthology Series or Movie	Tom Hollander	Nominated	
2024	Primetime Emmy Awards	Outstanding Lead Actress in a Limited or Anthology Series or Movie	Naomi Watts	Nominated	
2024	Primetime Emmy Awards	Outstanding Supporting Actor in a Limited or Anthology Series or Movie	Treat Williams	Nominated	
2024	Primetime Emmy Awards	Outstanding Supporting Actress in a Limited or Anthology Series or Movie	Diane Lane	Nominated	
2024	Hollywood Music in Media Awards	Original Score – TV Show/Limited Series	Julia Newman	Nominated	
2024	Set Decorators Society of America Awards	Best Achievement in Décor/Design of a One Hour Period Series	Cherish M. Hale, Kathy Orlando, Mark Ricker	Nominated	
2025	Artios Awards	Outstanding Achievement in Casting – Limited Series	Alexa L. Fogel, Kathryn Zamora-Benson	Nominated	
2025	Costume Designers Guild Awards	Excellence in Period Television	Lou Eyrich and Rudy Mance (for "Hats, Gloves and Effete Homosexuals")	Nominated	
2025	Critics' Choice Awards	Best Actor in a Movie/Miniseries	Tom Hollander	Nominated	
2025	Critics' Choice Awards	Best Actress in a Movie/ Miniseries	Naomi Watts	Nominated	
2025	Critics' Choice Awards	Best Supporting Actor in a Movie/Miniseries	Treat Williams	Nominated	
2025	Make-Up Artists and Hair Stylists Guild Awards	Best Period and/or Character Make-Up in a Television Series, Television Limited or Miniseries or Television New Media Series	Jackie Risotto, Kristen Alimena, Christine Hooghuis, Kyra Panchenko, Emily Marroquin	Nominated	
2025	Make-Up Artists and Hair Stylists Guild Awards	Best Period and/or Character Hair Styling in a Television Series, Television Limited or Miniseries or Television New Media Series	Sean Flanigan, Chris Clark, Josh Gericke, Kevin Maybee	Nominated	
2025	Satellite Awards	Best Miniseries & Limited Series or Motion Picture Made for Television	Feud: Capote vs. The Swans	Nominated	
2025	Satellite Awards	Best Actor in a Miniseries, Limited Series, or Motion Picture Made for Television	Tom Hollander	Nominated	
2025	Satellite Awards	Best Actress in a Miniseries, Limited Series, or Motion Picture Made for Television	Naomi Watts	Nominated	
2025	Satellite Awards	Best Actress in a Supporting Role in a Series, Miniseries & Limited Series, or Motion Picture Made for Television	Diane Lane	Won	
2025	Satellite Awards	Best Ensemble: Television Series	Feud: Capote vs. The Swans	Won	
