= Frederick Ames =

Frederick Ames may refer to:

- Frederick Lothrop Ames (1835–1893), American railroad executive and Massachusetts state senator
- Frederick Lothrop Ames Jr. (1876–1921), his son, Massachusetts financier and socialite
- Frederick-Ames EOS/SFA, a single-seat sports aircraft
