= Down There =

Down There may refer to:

- Là-Bas (novel), an 1891 book by the French writer Joris-Karl Huysmans
- Down There (album), the 2010 debut solo album by Avey Tare
- Down There (film), a 2006 film
- Down There..., a 1991 demo released by Beherit recording as The Lord Diabolus
- Down There Press, a publisher

== See also ==
- Down There on a Visit, a 1962 novel by English author Christopher Isherwood
- Down Here (disambiguation)
