= Cryder triplets =

20th-century American socialites

The Cryder triplets were the female American socialites Edith, Ethel, and Elizabeth ("Elsie") Cryder, who entered Manhattan society at the turn of the 20th century. While it is unknown if they were genetically identical, they apparently looked so similar that "the only way to distinguish them was by their different hair ribbons, one red, one light blue, the other white."

The Cryder sisters were born into some wealth, grew up in France after the money vanished, and returned to New York in 1899 where they married well. Their father Duncan Cryder was a tea importer. They had an older sister, Anita Cryder, who was born in China, and died of illness in New York. They had a one-year-younger brother Odgen Cryder who was killed in a streetcar accident at age 17. A memorial stained-glass window for Ogden Cryder, designed by Tiffany Studios, was installed in Southampton's St. Andrews Dune Church in 1902.

- Edith Cryder (December 2, 1882 – January 10, 1954) married Frederick Lothrop Ames Jr. and then Roger W. Cutler. She had two children with Ames, Frederick Lothrop Ames III, and Mary Callender Ames, and raised them in Boston. After the death of her first husband Ames, she remarried textile manufacturer Cutler and lived with him at the "Ames Villa" in Newport, Rhode Island. Her daughter married Howard G. Cushing.
- Ethel Cryder (December 2, 1882 – August 2, 1964) married Henry V. Higgins of London, and then Arthur Fowler. She was friends with Consuelo Vanderbilt in London; Vanderbilt wrote in her memoir that she was a "frequent and welcome guest...An American by birth, one of the lovely Cryder triplets, she was a gay and delightful visitor. During the war we worked together for our American Hospital and she organised the volunteer workers both for the hospital and for the Y.M.C.A. that we opened for our troops. I looked forward to our peaceful week-ends and deeply resented being robbed of them by clamorous outsiders who wished to be invited." Ethel Cryder Higgins Fowler became an important hostess in Washington, D.C., and was close with Alice Roosevelt Longworth.
- Elizabeth O. "Elsie" Cryder (December 2, 1882 – July 13, 1981) married William Woodward II; their son William Woodward was shot and killed by his wife Ann in 1955, attracting the attention of writer Truman Capote. The Woodwards also had daughters Edith Woodward Bancroft, Alice "Libby" Woodward, Sarah Woodward Sewall, and Ethel Woodward De Croisset. Ethel De Croisset retreated to a villa on Malaga after separating from her husband and the shooting death of her brother. Elsie Cryder Woodward donated money and bequeathed art to establish the Woodward Wing of the Baltimore Art Museum. After her butler of 40 years retired, she sold her apartment, and moved into a one-bedroom at the Waldorf-Astoria Hotel. Following the death of her husband, she developed a second, parallel social life, in addition to the one she had shared with her wealthy husband and Society, telling an interviewer about her friend Andy Warhol, "Oh, Andy brought me such a present. I wish you could see it. It's a bracelet—one of those plastic kinds that you see all the colored girls wearing. It was fun. But, you know, I never mix my friends; Andy and his group just wouldn't get along with my bridge-playing friends." Mrs. William Woodward died at the Waldorf in 1981 at age 98.

== Sources ==
- Roosevelt, Felicia Warburg (1975). Doers & Dowagers. Garden City, N.Y.: Doubleday. ISBN 0-385-06527-2. LCCN 74012708. OCLC 1102990.
