= Mark Watson-Gandy =

British lawyer and educationalist

Professor Mark Watson-Gandy of Myrton OBE
- Born: November 8, 1967 (age 58); Buckinghamshire, England
- Education: Essex University (LLB)
- Occupation: Barrister-at-law
- Known for: Corporate law
- Spouse: Emanuella Johanna Christina née Giavarra (m. 1997)
- Children: 1 son, 1 daughter
- Relatives: Admiral Alec Tyndale-Biscoe; Anthony Watson-Gandy; Gyles Brandreth
- Awards: OBE; CStJ

Mark Watson-Gandy (born 8 November 1967), is a British lawyer and educationalist, specialising in UK insolvency law, company law and private international law.

Since 2019, Watson-Gandy serves as chairman of the Science and Technology Ethics Advisory Committee at the Home Office.

== Early life and education ==
Born in 1967 to Alastair Watson-Gandy and Barbara née Mądry, scion of the Watson-Gandy-Brandreth gentry family, he was educated at Dr Challoner's Grammar School before graduating Bachelor of Laws (LLB) from the University of Essex.

Watson-Gandy inherited the Scottish Barony of Myrton, but does not use the title professionally.

== Career ==
Watson-Gandy was called to the Bar in 1990 at the Inner Temple and in 2013 to the Eastern Caribbean Bar (British Virgin Islands). He is a member of Three Stone chambers. A visiting professor of the University of Westminster since 1999, he has pioneered its Master of Laws degree in corporate finance law, and is a special lecturer at Cass Business School.

In 2000, Watson-Gandy was appointed by Gareth Williams, Baron Williams of Mostyn as a Junior Counsel to the Crown serving until 2012. In 2010, he was counsel to the Conference of Bishops for the state visit of Pope Benedict XVI to the United Kingdom. He then advised Gurkha veterans for the inquiry of the all-party parliamentary group on Gurkha welfare.

In 2013, Watson-Gandy represented Craig Whyte in litigation over the financing of his ill-fated acquisition of Rangers Football Club. He also served as counsel to the court-appointed trustee in litigation leading to the overturning of the UK bankruptcy of Tom McFeely. He was counsel for the court-appointed amicus curiae in litigation over the collapse of the Stanford International Bank in Antigua and of Fairfield Sentry in the British Virgin Islands. He later successfully represented the court-appointed administrators of Cambridge Analytica.

A member of the Home Office Science Advisory Council, beginning in 2019, Watson-Gandy serves as chairman of the Biometrics and Forensic Ethics Group. He is also the former chairman of Mental Health First Aid England and the Pure Cremation Group.

In 2022, the Catholic Herald featured Watson-Gandy in its list of "Catholic Leaders of Today", the UK's 100 most influential lay Roman Catholics.

== Publications ==
=== Books ===
- Simple Contract Law - published in London 2020
- KidsMBA: How to build a successful business - published in London 2018
- Personal Insolvency Practice: Litigation Procedure & Precedents 2nd Edition - published by Wildy & Sons, London, 2018
- Corporate Insolvency Practice: Litigation Procedure & Precedents 2nd Edition - published by Wildy & Sons, London 2017
- Tolley's Company Secretary's Review – Corporate Precedents: Directors - published by Wildy & Sons, London 2013
- Personal Insolvency Practice: Litigation Procedure & Precedents – published by Wildy & Sons, London 2012
- Corporate Insolvency Practice: Litigation Procedure & Precedents – published by Wildy & Sons, London 2010
- Watson-Gandy on Accountants – Law, Practice and Procedure, 2nd Edition, published by Wildy & Sons, London 2008
- Watson-Gandy on Accountants – Law, Practice and Procedure, 1st Edition, published by Wildy & Sons, London 2000
- Beyond the Peradventure, published in London 1991.

=== Editorships ===
Watson-Gandy has co-edited Butterworths Corporate Law Service, LexisNexis (Company Law: co-editor since 2008), having previously been assistant editor of the Family Court Reporter, local government editor of Justice of the Peace magazine and editor of Litigation, the legal journal.

=== Writing and speaking ===
Watson-Gandy contributes a monthly column to Business Money, the commercial finance magazine. He also writes and speaks regularly in the media on legal matters and business education.

== Civic appointments and charitable service ==
Watson-Gandy's appointments to boards of companies as well as not-for-profit organisations include:

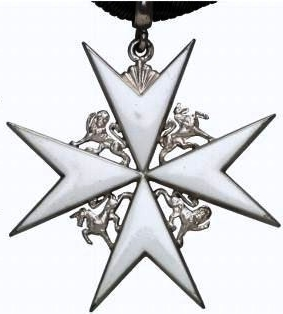
CStJ neck decoration

- Chairman of Kids MBA Ltd;
- Non-executive director of the Institute of Certified Bookkeepers;
- Chancellor of the British Association of the Sovereign Military Order of Malta;
- Liveryman (now Past Master) of the Scriveners' Company.

== Honours and arms ==
Invested as Commander of the Most Venerable Order of Saint John (CStJ) in 2020, Watson-Gandy was appointed Officer of the Order of the British Empire (OBE) in the 2024 New Year Honours for "public and voluntary service".

- Knight of the Sovereign Military Order of Malta (SMOM)
- Knight of the Order of Saint Gregory the Great of the Holy See
- Knight of the Sacred Military Constantinian Order of Saint George of the House of Bourbon-Two Sicilies
- Cross pro Merito Melitensi of the Sovereign Military Order of Malta
- Officer of the Order of Menelik II of the House of Solomon
- Freeman of the City of London
- Freeman of the Goldsmiths' Company
- Master Scrivener for 2022/23.

Coat of arms of Professor Mark Watson-Gandy of Myrton

Adopted
Grant (Heralds' College, England) and matriculated, Lyon Court, Scotland (2005)
Coronet
Chapeau of a Scottish feudal baron
Crest
Upon the Battlements of a Tower Proper a Lamb passant Or holding in its dexter foreleg a Staff also Proper flying therefrom a Pennon Argent charged with a Cross Gules
Escutcheon
Quarterly, 1st and 4th, Per pale Sable and Or five Mascles in cross counterchanged (for BRANDRETH); 2nd, Per pale Argent and Or on a Chevron Azure between in chief a Crescent of the Last between two Martlets Sable and in base a Crescent of the Third a Martlet between two Crescents of the Second (for WATSON); 3rd, Per fess nebuly Gules and Argent in chief two Pairs of Swords in saltire Proper pommel and hilts Or and in base a Saltire couped of the First (for GANDY)
Motto
(Above) Esto quod esse videris (Latin)
Orders
The circlet of the Order of St John surrounding the Shield and suspended beneath the OBE decoration
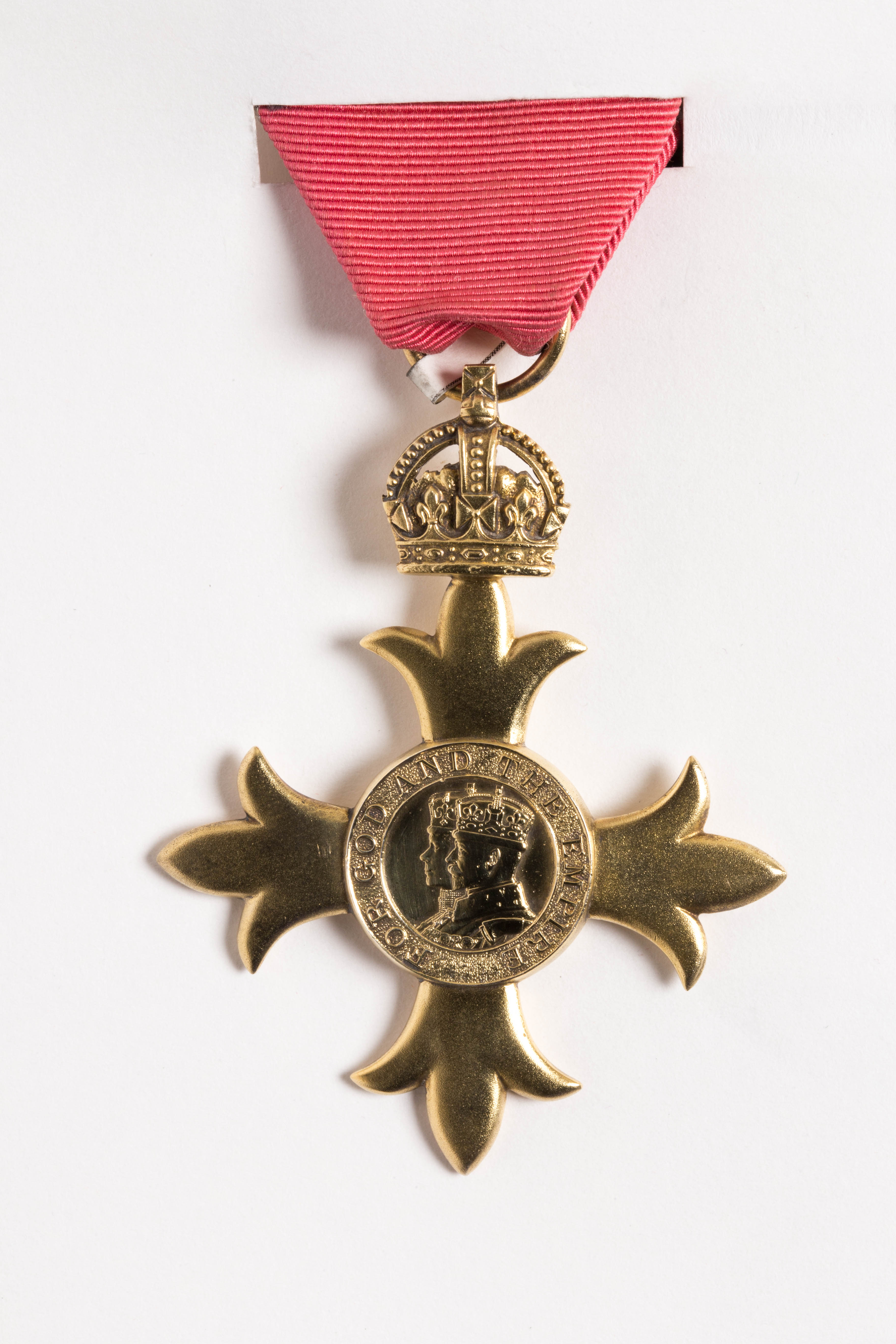
Other elements
As Master Scrivener, Professor Watson-Gandy could impale the Scriveners' arms (dexter) with those of his family (sinister)
