= Ann Woodward =

American socialite and murder suspect (1915–1975)

- Born: Angeline Lucille Crowell; December 12, 1915; Pittsburg, Kansas, U.S.
- Died: October 10, 1975 (aged 59); New York City, U.S.
- Cause of death: Suicide by cyanide poisoning
- Burial place: Woodlawn Cemetery
- Education: Kansas City Junior College
- Occupations: Showgirl; model; actress; socialite
- Spouse: William Woodward Jr. (m. 1943; died 1955)
- Children: 2

Ann Eden Woodward (born Angeline Lucille Crowell; December 12, 1915 – October 10, 1975) was an American socialite, showgirl, model, and radio actress. In 1940, while working as a radio actress, she was voted "The Most Beautiful Girl in Radio". Woodward became a prominent and controversial figure in New York high society after her marriage to banking heir William Woodward Jr.

While never formally charged or convicted, she came under suspicion of murder following the 1955 shooting of her husband. A Nassau County grand jury determined that it was an accident. The circumstances surrounding her husband's death, which Life called "The Shooting of the Century", led to Woodward becoming a cause célèbre and, later, her banishment from New York high society. Truman Capote published excerpts from an unfinished novel Answered Prayers, in which a pseudonymized but identifiable Woodward is accused of murdering her husband. Shortly before the stories were scheduled for publication in Esquire, she died after ingesting cyanide. Woodward faced challenges throughout her life, and the exact reasons for her suicide remain unclear.

== Biography ==
Woodward was born Angeline Lucille Crowell on December 12, 1915 in Pittsburg, Kansas, to Colonel M. Jesse Crowell, a streetcar conductor and retired military officer from Detroit, Michigan, and his wife Ethel Smiley Crowell, a schoolteacher and one of the earliest women in Kansas to receive a master’s degree from the University of Kansas in 1921. She attended Kansas City Junior College for one year. As a young adult, she moved to Kansas City and changed her name to Ann Eden after her parents divorced and remarried.

In 1937, Woodward moved to New York City to work as a model and actress and was signed with John Robert Powers modeling agency. Through the Powers agency, Woodward landed roles as a radio actress, and was voted "The Most Beautiful Girl in Radio" in 1940. She had a role in Noël Coward's Set to Music.

While working as a showgirl at FeFe's Monte Carlo, a nightclub in New York City, Woodward met William Woodward Sr., a wealthy banker from a prominent old money family who served as chairman of the Central Hanover Bank & Trust. It is speculated that she became Woodward's mistress. She was later courted by Woodward's son, William Woodward Jr., and married him in 1943 at St. Luke's Memorial Episcopal Church in Tacoma, Washington. The marriage was a controversial one, and she initially was shunned by New York high society. Her mother-in-law, Elizabeth "Elsie" Ogden Cryder Woodward, one of the famous Cryder triplets and dowager of New York society, initially objected to the marriage. Woodward eventually was welcomed into prominent social circles and became a leading figure in society. She had two sons, William Woodward III and James Woodward, with her husband.

The marriage was an unhappy one, both spouses having strings of affairs. Her husband asked for a divorce in 1947, but Woodward refused.

She founded the Ann Eden Woodward Foundation and supported causes such as the World Wildlife Foundation, the Museum of Modern Art, WNET, New York’s public television station, and the American Red Cross. Some of her collection of paintings, Chinese antiquities, and couture clothing are housed in the Metropolitan Museum of Art.

== Shooting, aftermath, and suicide ==
In late 1955, there were a string of burglaries in the Woodwards' neighborhood in Oyster Bay. On October 30, 1955, Woodward and her husband returned to their country estate after attending a party hosted by Florence Tucker Baker in honor of the Duke and Duchess of Windsor. Both were nervous about reports of a prowler roaming nearby estates, including their own. The Woodwards, both avid hunters, each went to their separate bedrooms that evening with loaded shotguns.

A few hours later, according to Ann's telling of the events, she heard a noise on the roof and went into a darkened hallway carrying her gun. There she saw a shadowy figure standing in front of Woodward's bedroom door, and fired the gun. The man she fired on was in fact her husband; the weapon was loaded with buckshot and should not have been lethal, but an unexpected ricochet caused the buckshot to enter William's temple, killing him. Upon arriving at the home, police found Ann holding her husband's body and sobbing. She immediately told the police that she had shot her husband because she thought he was a burglar.

A Nassau County grand jury declined to indict her, after deliberating for 30 minutes - ultimately concluding that the shooting was an accident. Police later arrested a man named Paul Wirths, who admitted that he had attempted to break into the Woodwards' house on the night of the shooting. Wirths claimed that he had been scared by the sound of gunshots and then left. Wirths subsequently pleaded guilty to having entered the Woodward house in an attempt to rob it.

The shooting led to Woodward becoming a cause célèbre in New York, and was referred to by Life as "The Shooting of the Century". Although she was exonerated, Woodward was shunned by New York high society for the rest of her life. Elsie, her mother-in-law, said "I know Ann loved Billy very much and the shooting could be nothing but an accident". Woodward and her sons moved in with her mother-in-law at the Woodward Mansion at 9 East 86th St on Manhattan’s Upper East Side, and Woodward later moved to Europe.

In 1975, Truman Capote published excerpts of his unfinished novel Answered Prayers (eventually published as Answered Prayers: The Unfinished Novel in 1986) in Esquire, which scandalized high society. The novel's characters were based on Capote's real-life acquaintances who were prominent socialites of the time. The published excerpts, heavily fabricated and rooted in gossip, claimed to reveal scandals and issues within the lives of William S. Paley, Babe Paley, Happy Rockefeller, Gloria Vanderbilt, and Woodward. Despite having only met Woodward once, briefly, in the Palace Hotel in St. Moritz, Capote took an immediate dislike to her, and became obsessed with her. In one of the excerpts from Answered Prayers published in Esquire magazine, "La Côte Basque 1965", Capote writes about a character named Ann Hopkins, a bigamist and gold digger who shoots her husband, based on Woodward's killing of her husband, implying that it was murder. The released excerpts caused a wave of gossip.

Woodward killed herself by taking cyanide; according to her friends, she was already suffering from severe depression. Her body was discovered on October 10, 1975, in her apartment on Fifth Avenue. Woodward's funeral took place at St. James Episcopal Church on the Upper East Side.

Her mother-in-law said of her death, "she shot my son, and Truman just murdered her, and so now I suppose we don't have to worry about that anymore." Subsequently, both of Woodward's sons died by suicide; James in 1978 and William in 1999.

The incident was also portrayed in Dominick Dunne's 1985 novel The Two Mrs. Grenvilles, which was turned into a television miniseries in 1987. In the series Feud: Capote vs. The Swans, Woodward is portrayed by Demi Moore. The series focuses on Capote's ostracization from New York society following the publication of "La Côte Basque 1965".
