= Down Here (disambiguation) =

Down Here is a 2000 album by Tracy Bonham.

Down Here may also refer to:

- Downhere, band
- "Down Here" (it's Quiet Down Here), popular song composed by May Brahe, lyrics P. J. O'Reilly 1915
- "Down Here", song from Body Head Bangerz: Volume One
- "Down Here", song by John Grant from Grey Tickles, Black Pressure

== See also ==
- Down There (disambiguation)
