= Anthony Watson-Gandy =

Scholar in London (1919–1952)

Anthony Blethyn Watson-Gandy (29 June 1919 – 27 June 1952) was a British scholar, translator and socialite, renowned as the last lover of Denham Fouts, a bon vivant and companion to a veritable who's who of pre-1950 homosexuals (such as Viscount Tredegar and Crown Prince Paul of Greece). Watson-Gandy lived in Rome until 1948 with Denny Fouts, who died there from a drug overdose.

== Biography ==
Scion of an armigerous gentry family, the youngest son of Major William Watson MC (1872–1947), (Note: Major Watson assumed his wife's surname of Gandy upon their marriage in 1906, becoming Watson-Gandy) and Annis Vere née Gandy (1884–1960), daughter of James Milnes Gandy Gandy formerly Brandreth, High Sheriff of Westmorland (1892), who assumed by Royal Licence his mother's surname of Gandy, his parents divorced in 1932.

After attending Westminster School, Watson-Gandy went up to King's College, Cambridge, before pursuing further studies in modern languages at the Sorbonne in Paris. Commissioned into the Royal Air Force, he served as a Flying Officer during World War II.

After WWII Watson-Gandy settled in Rome where he joined the circle of the infamous American socialite, Denny Fouts, (Note: Fouts enjoyed a privileged and prosperous upbringing but spent much of his later life dissolute, lying "in bed like a corpse, sheet to his chin, a cigarette between his lips turning to ash. His lover, Anthony Watson-Gandy, a writer and translator, would remove the cigarette just before it burned his lips.") after whose death in 1948 Watson-Gandy travelled to the Far East, settling at Macao where he lived with a Chinese boyfriend, smoking opium and studying Mandarin Chinese.

Watson-Gandy translated from French The Rise and Splendour of the Chinese Empire (1952) by René Grousset, being elected a Fellow of the Institute of Linguists. Shortly after returning to London, he died on 27 June 1952.

Appointed a Chevalier de la Légion d'Honneur after the Second World War, Watson-Gandy became a Chevalier du Tastevin.

== See also ==
- Professor Mark Watson-Gandy of Myrton
