= Science and Technology Ethics Advisory Committee =

- Professional title: Non-departmental public body
- Location: United Kingdom
- Chairman: Mark Watson-Gandy
- Website: Official website

The Science and Technology Ethics Advisory Committee (formerly Biometrics and Forensic Ethics Group and National DNA Database Ethics Group) is a non-departmental public body that advises the government of the United Kingdom on the ethical issues regarding collection, use, and retention of biometric and forensic material and the use of large and complex data sets and projects using explainable data-driven technology. Professor Mark Watson-Gandy took over as the chairman of the body in 2019, replacing Christopher Hughes O.B.E. who held the position since 2009.

It was officially renamed the Science and Technology Ethics Advisory Committee in September 2025.
