= Peter Watson (arts benefactor) =

English art collector and arts benefactor (1908–1956)

Victor William Watson (14 September 1908 – 3 May 1956), also known as Peter Watson, was a British art collector, patron, and magazine editor. During the Second World War, Watson funded Cyril Connolly's Horizon magazine and served as its art editor, using it to promote contemporary European art and emerging artists. A key benefactor of the Institute of Contemporary Arts in London, he played an influential role in promoting avant-garde artists, including Francis Bacon, Lucian Freud, and John Craxton. He also collected works by artists including Joan Miró, Paul Klee, and Pablo Picasso.

== Early life and education ==
Victor William (Peter) Watson was the son of William George Watson (later Sir George Watson, 1st Baronet), a self-made businessman who built a substantial fortune in the dairy industry. Sir William invested his wealth in a large country estate at Sulhamstead Abbots near Reading and used it to support his social advancement, including obtaining a knighthood and pursuing a barony.

He was the youngest of three children by over a decade. His sister Florence Nagle (1894–1988) became a racehorse breeder and trainer. His brother Sir Norman Watson, 2nd Baronet (1897–1989), provided funding for the early development of Lake Louise, a ski resort in Alberta, Canada.

He was educated at Lockers Park School, Eton College and St John's College, Oxford.

== Art collecting and patronage ==
Watson was an avid art collector, acquiring works by such artists as Miró, Klee, and Pablo Picasso, which were displayed in his Paris apartment in the 1930s.

In 1940, Watson financed Cyril Connolly's literary magazine Horizon and served as its arts editor until its closure in 1949. As its principal backer, he exercised considerable influence over its visual content, including the number of illustrations, while using the magazine to promote emerging artists and broaden its scope beyond British art, particularly toward Paris. He commissioned writing on relatively little-known figures in England at the time, such as Balthus, Giorgio Morandi, and Paul Klee, and facilitated contributions from figures including Daniel Kahnweiler and Michel Leiris. In its final issue, Horizon published one of the earliest substantial critical essays on Francis Bacon, written by Robert Melville. Stephen Spender later recalled that Watson disliked "priggishness, pomposity and almost everything to do with public life," and he suspected that he had educated himself "through a love of beautiful works and of people in whom he saw beauty..." He added, "When I think of him then, I think of his clothes, which were beautiful, his general neatness and cleanness, which seemed almost those of a handsome young Bostonian."

Alongside his editorial work, Watson was a principal benefactor of the Institute of Contemporary Arts (ICA), founded in 1946, where his financial support gave him significant influence. As a member of its managing committee, he helped shape its early programme, selecting exhibitions of artists such as Roberto Matta and Wifredo Lam, and in 1954 advocated for Bacon’s first retrospective. He also provided financial support to artists, including Francis Bacon, Lucian Freud and John Craxton.

== Personal life ==
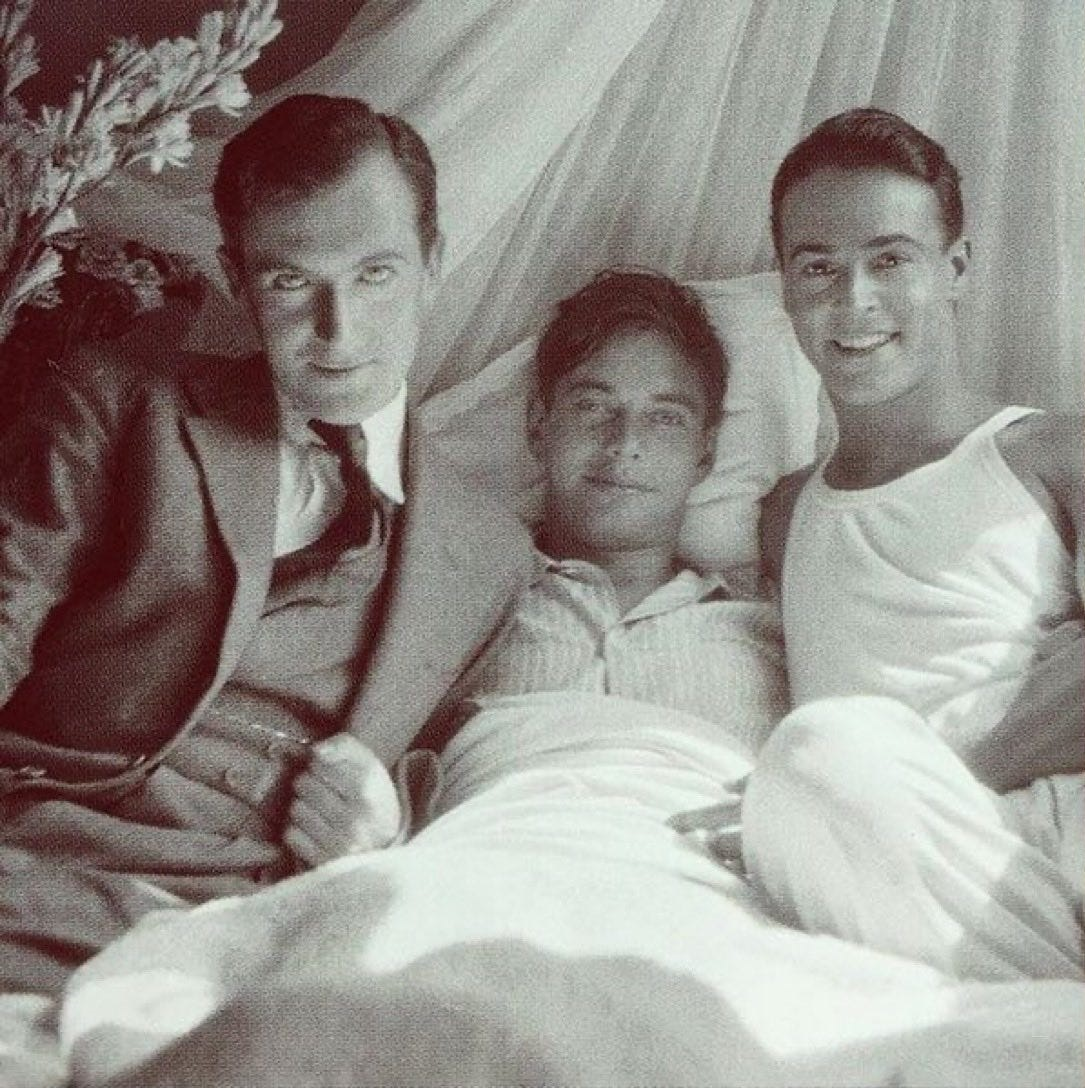
Watson (centre) with his lover Oliver Messel (right) and Cecil Beaton, c. 1930s

Clive Fisher wrote that Watson "was a figure of striking attractiveness; women in particular seem to have found his manners irresistible... almost everyone appears to have liked him." One of Watson's lovers was the American male prostitute and socialite Denham Fouts, whom he continued to support even after they separated as a result of Fouts's drug addiction.

In 1930 Watson met photographer Cecil Beaton in Vienna while travelling with stage designer Oliver Messel. Although initially unremarkable to Beaton, Watson soon became the object of his intense admiration, though the two never became lovers. The group travelled together, including a stay in Venice, where Watson and Messel developed a romantic relationship. During this period, Watson's rapport with Beaton fostered a close friendship, as Beaton became deeply infatuated. Watson's influence was significant, with Beaton later imitating his style and mannerisms during a four-year period of emotional dependence.

== Death ==
Watson was found drowned in his bathtub on 3 May 1956 at his home in Knightsbridge, London. At the Westminster inquest, his live-in boyfriend, Norman Fowler (11 May 1927 – 23 March 1971), testified that Watson had been in poor health for several months, complaining of exhaustion and insomnia, and appeared "very upset and distraught" on the night of his death. Fowler last saw him entering the bathroom; when he later found the lights still on and heard water running, he summoned a policeman, who forced entry and discovered Watson's body submerged in the bath. Medical evidence indicated death by inhalation of soapy water, with no drugs present, and the coroner recorded a verdict of accidental death. Later speculation suggested foul play involving Fowler, who inherited most of Watson's estate and also died by drowning in a bathtub in 1971.
