= John Craxton =

English painter (1922–2009)

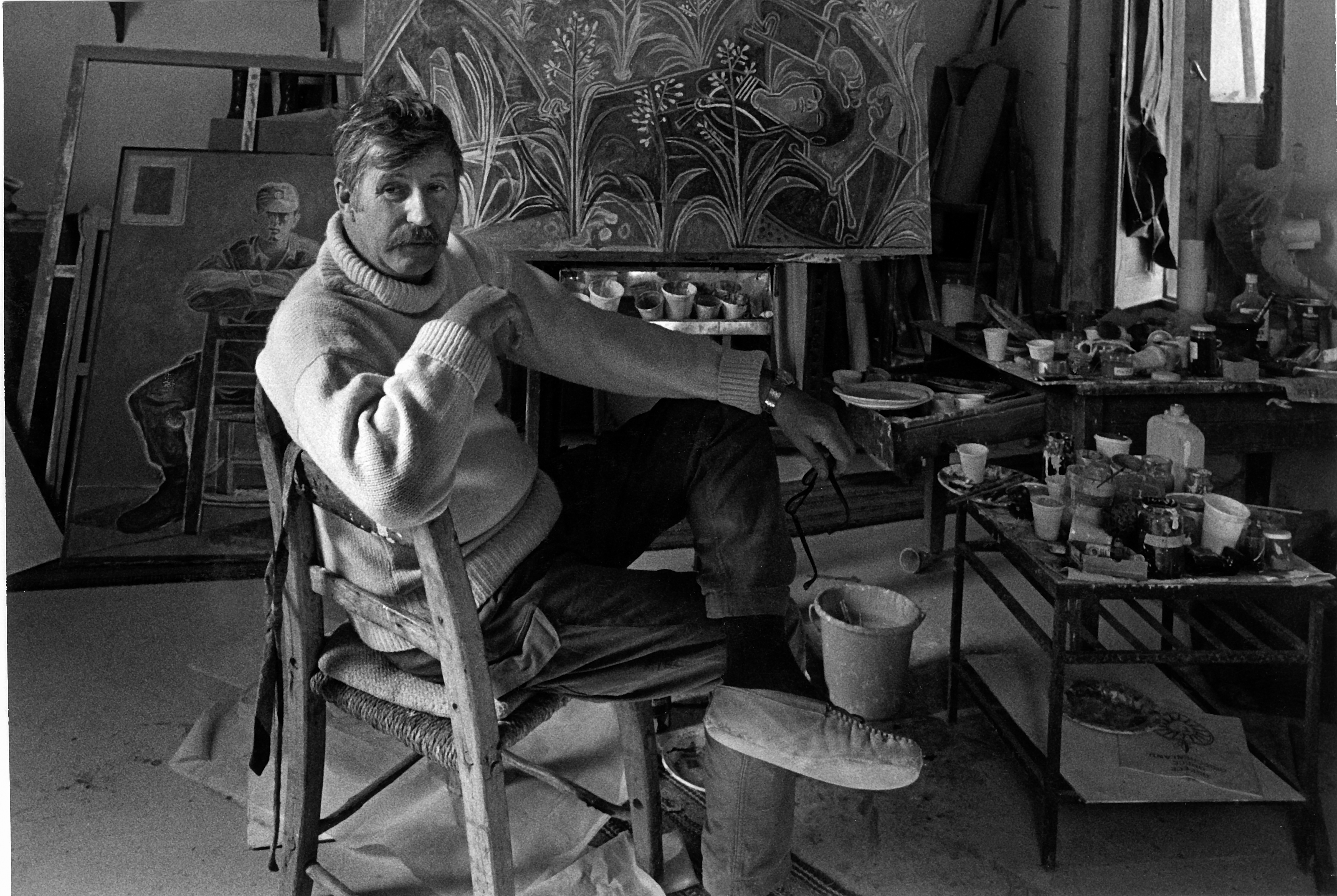
- John Craxton in his studio (1983)
- Born: 3 October 1922; St John's Wood, London
- Died: 17 November 2009 (aged 87)
- Known for: painting

John Leith Craxton RA, (3 October 1922 – 17 November 2009) was an English painter. He was sometimes called a neo-Romantic artist but he preferred to be known as a "kind of Arcadian".

== Biography ==
=== Career ===
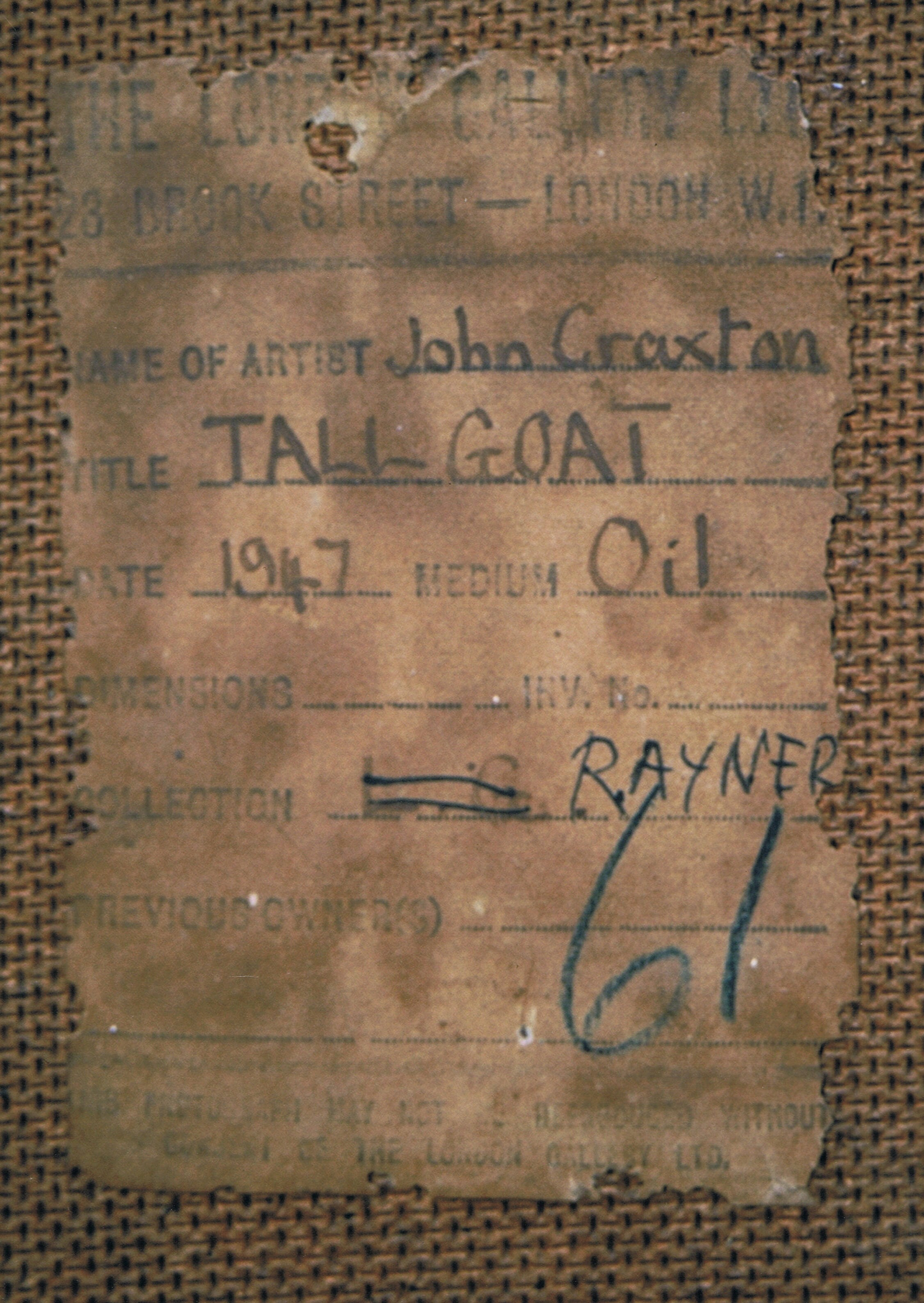
The label on the back of Craxton's Tall Goat, 1947

John was the son of musician Harold Craxton and his wife Essie. His older brother Harold Antony Craxton (1918–1999) became a leading television producer and outside broadcaster. His sister Janet became a notable oboist.

He went to Clayesmore School but left without qualifications. He applied for Chelsea School of Art but was considered to be too young to attend nude life classes. Instead he studied at the Académie Julian and the Académie de la Grande Chaumière in Paris during 1939, until the outbreak of war meant he had to complete his studies in London, at Westminster School of Art and the Central School of Arts and Crafts. Between 1941 and 1942, having been rejected for military service on medical grounds, he attended Goldsmiths College, then toured the wilds of Pembrokeshire with Graham Sutherland in 1943. His first solo exhibition was in London in 1942 at the Swiss Cottage Café, and his first major solo show at the Leicester Galleries in 1944. His work was seen as part of the neo-romantic revival, and his early pre-1945 work shows the influence of Sutherland and Samuel Palmer, and he was also heavily influenced by friend and patron Peter Watson.

After the war he travelled to the Isles of Scilly, Switzerland, Istanbul, Spain, Italy, but mainly Greece especially Crete, from 1946 to 1966. He moved permanently to Crete from about 1970, and alternated between living on Crete and in London. The writer Richard Olney remembered Craxton in Paris, en route to Greece during the summer of 1951;

"Most nights, John Craxton, a young English painter, arrived to share my bed; we kept each other warm. He moved in a bucolic dreamworld, peopled with beautiful Greek goat herders. Soon he left for Greece."

In 1951 Craxton was a ballet designer for the production of Daphnis et Chloé by the Sadler's Wells Ballet (now The Royal Ballet) at Covent Garden, at a time when ballet stage design provided a haven for the neo-Romantic arts. He was able to use his first-hand experience of Greece to inform his ballet designs.

He had numerous shows of his paintings in both England and Greece. A major retrospective show was held at Whitechapel Art Gallery in 1967. His later work became more formal, structured and decorative, although still expressing Romantic pastoral themes.

He produced the scenery and costumes for the Royal Opera House's 1968 production of Igor Stravinsky's Apollo.

His work was also reproduced in magazines such as New Writing, Horizon, and he has illustrated the books of Patrick Leigh Fermor. He produced lithographs for several anthologies edited by Geoffrey Grigson, including Visionary Poems (1944).

He was elected Royal Academician in 1993. Craxton lived and worked in both Chania, Crete and London. His love of Crete extended to his being one of the British Honorary Consuls there. He died aged 87, survived by his long-term partner Richard Riley.

A monograph by Ian Collins about Craxton's work, John Craxton, was published by Lund Humphries in 2011. The Fitzwilliam Museum in Cambridge held an exhibition of his work from December 2013 to 21 April 2014. In 2021, Ian Collins published a full biography: John Craxton: A Life of Gifts (Yale University Press); this book won the Runciman Award in 2022. Tony Britten wrote and directed the documentary film John Craxton - A Life Of Gifts in 2022.

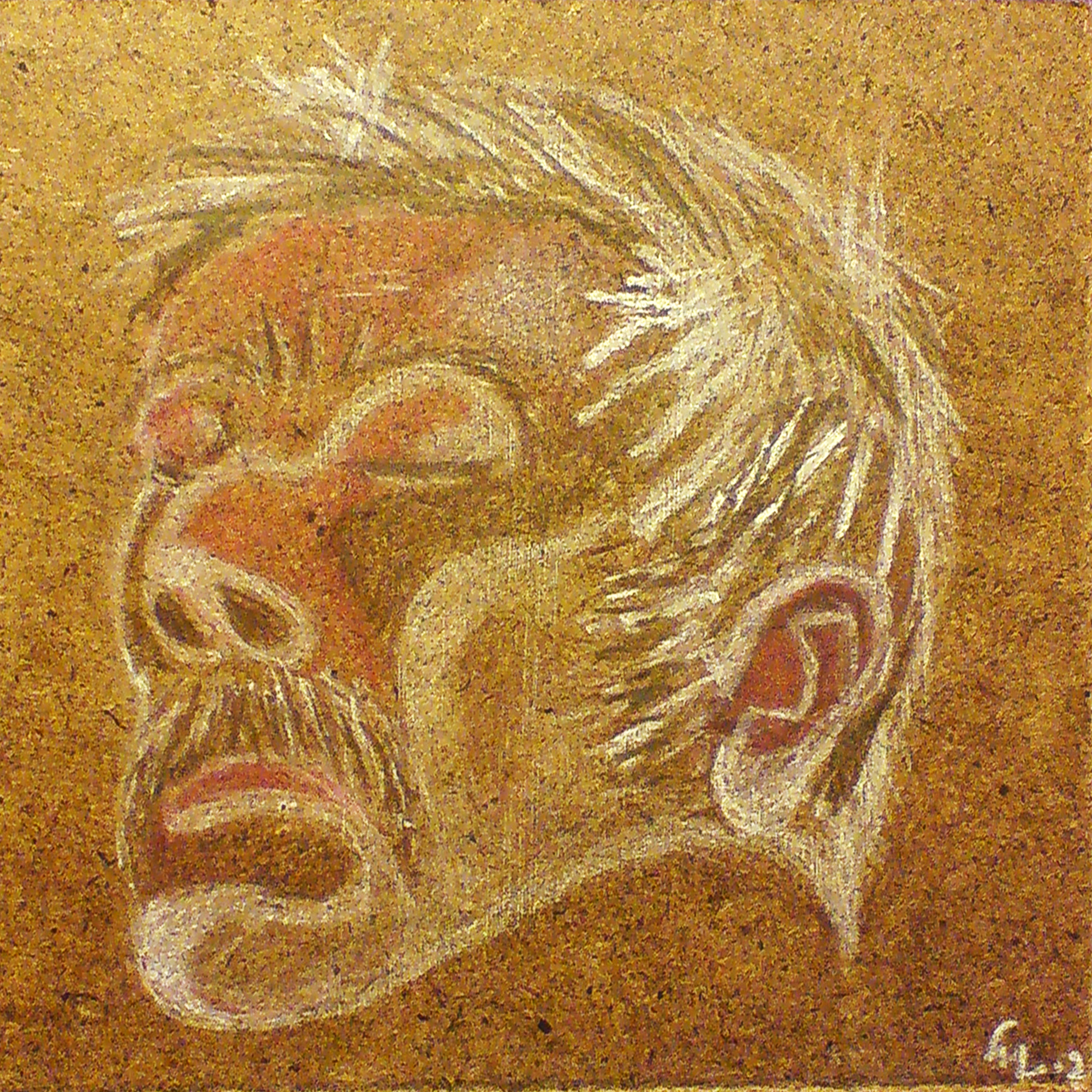
Portrait of John Craxton sleeping by Alexandros Kleidonas (London, 2002)
