= Denham Fouts =

American prostitute

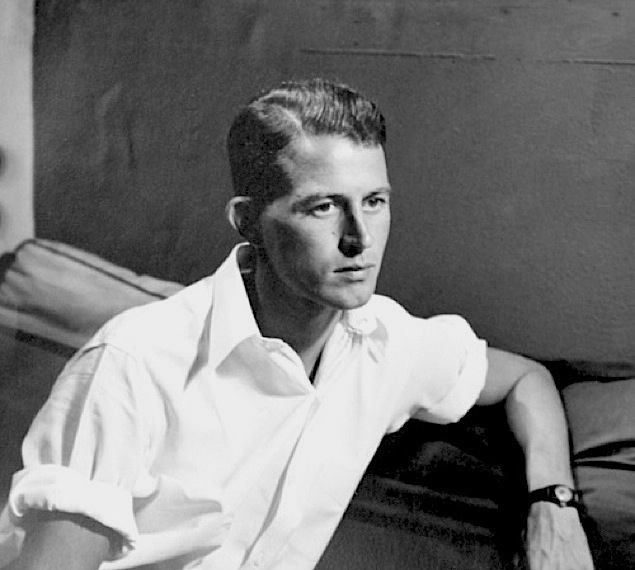
- Born: Louis Denham Fouts; May 9, 1914; Jacksonville, Florida, US
- Died: December 16, 1948 (aged 34); Rome, Italy
- Other names: Denny Fouts
- Occupations: male prostitute, socialite

Denham "Denny" Fouts (May 9, 1914 – December 16, 1948) was an American male prostitute and socialite. He served as the inspiration for characters by Truman Capote, Gore Vidal, Christopher Isherwood, and Gavin Lambert. He was allegedly a lover of Prince Paul of Greece and French actor Jean Marais.

== Biography ==
From Jacksonville, Florida, he was born Louis Denham Fouts, a son of Yale graduate Edwin Fouts, who was the president of a broom factory, and his wife, the former Mary E. Denham (1890–1970). He had two siblings, Ellen (born 1916) and Frederic (1918–1994).

In 1926, 12-year-old Fouts submitted a letter to Time magazine, protesting the abuse of animals in the making of movies. In his teens, Fouts worked as a clerk at an ice-cream company in Jacksonville. Later he was sent north by his father to Washington, D.C., having asked a relative, who was the president of Safeway Inc., to give him a job. Fouts left for Manhattan, working for a time as a stock boy and attracting a good deal of attention for his looks, which were described as "thin as a hieroglyph, he had dark hair, light brown eyes, and a cleft chin." Writer Glenway Wescott considered him "absolutely enchanting and ridiculously good-looking."

He was taken up by a series of wealthy male and female patrons. His friends, who called him Denny, included Christopher Isherwood, Brion Gysin, Glenway Wescott, Truman Capote, George Platt Lynes, Jane and Paul Bowles, Jean and Cyril Connolly, and Michael Wishart. Isherwood described him as a mythic figure, "the most expensive male prostitute in the world" and Capote considered him the "Best-Kept Boy in the World". Fouts was at one time the boyfriend of artist Peter Watson, but they separated because of Fouts' opium addiction.

In 1938, Fouts introduced Brion Gysin to Paul and Jane Bowles, later shocking them by "shooting flaming arrows from his hotel window onto the busy Champs Élysées below", having spent some time in Tibet, learning archery. Fouts' occasionally outrageous behavior made some uncomfortable. Michael Shelden remarked that Fouts' "'Deep South' charm masked a volatile, sometimes nasty temper. There were rumours about his past and tales of erratic, dangerous behavior."

During World War II, Watson sent Fouts to the United States for his safety. He met Isherwood in Hollywood in August 1940. Isherwood's guru Swami Prabhavananda refused to accept Fouts as a disciple despite his interest in Vedanta. Isherwood, nonetheless, had Fouts move in with him in the summer of 1941 to "lead a life of meditation". This period is described in Isherwood's Down There on a Visit, where Fouts is represented as the character Paul. Some time into the war, Fouts, who was a conscientious objector, was drafted for the Civilian Public Service Camp. He later completed his high school diploma, studied medicine at UCLA and then settled in Europe. While in Paris, he sent a blank check to Truman Capote with only the word "come" written on it, after becoming enamored of the Harold Halma photograph of Capote on the original back dust jacket of Other Voices, Other Rooms. Capote rejected the check, but accepted his offer to visit, and would spend hours with Fouts in his dark apartment on the Rue du Bac, talking and listening to Fouts' stories.

Fouts was allegedly the lover of numerous notable figures, including Prince Paul of Greece (later King), and French actor Jean Marais. Another of his lovers was Evan Morgan, 2nd Viscount Tredegar. Capote, in exaggeration of his prowess, claimed that "had Denham Fouts yielded to Hitler's advances there would have been no World War Two." Katherine Bucknell, the editor of Christopher Isherwood's diaries, noted "Myth surrounds Denham Fouts", and one of his friends, John B.L. Goodwin said of Fouts: "He invented himself. If people didn't know his background he would make it up."

Fouts spent much of his later life dissolute, spending time "in bed like a corpse, sheet to his chin, a cigarette between his lips turning to ash. His lover Anthony Watson-Gandy would remove the cigarette just before it burned his lips." Fouts died in 1948 at the Pensione Foggetti in Rome at the age of 34 of a "hypoplastic aorta and hypertrophy of left ventricle". Goodwin told Isherwood that Fouts was found dead in the bathroom. His body was buried in the first zone, 11th row, of the city's Protestant Cemetery.

== Literary references ==
- Gavin Lambert's roman à clef Norman's Letter contains a character based on Fouts.
- Truman Capote's "Unspoiled Monsters", contained in his Answered Prayers: The Unfinished Novel, is based on Capote's conception of Fouts' life.
- Gore Vidal's short story "Pages from an Abandoned Journal", contained in his 1956 work A Thirsty Evil: Seven Short Stories is based on Fouts' life. Vidal was introduced to Fouts by John Lehmann.
- Christopher Isherwood's Down There on a Visit contains the novella Paul, whose titular character is based on Fouts.
- Michael Wishart, the painter, had an affair with Fouts, which his autobiography High Diver details.
