= The Two Mrs. Grenvilles =

- Title screen
- Genre: Drama
- Based on: The Two Mrs. Grenvilles by Dominick Dunne
- Screenplay by: Derek Marlowe
- Directed by: John Erman
- Starring: Stephen Collins; Ann-Margret; Claudette Colbert
- Theme music composer: Marvin Hamlisch
- Country of origin: United States
- Original language: English
- No. of episodes: 2

Production
- Executive producer: Susan G. Pollock
- Producer: Preston Fischer
- Production locations: Lee International Studios, Wembley, London, England
- Cinematography: Dennis C. Lewiston
- Editor: Jerrold L. Ludwig
- Running time: 190 mins
- Production company: Lorimar-Telepictures

Original release
- Network: NBC
- Release: February 8 – February 9, 1987

The Two Mrs. Grenvilles is a 1987 television miniseries based on Dominick Dunne's 1985 novel of the same name and dramatizing the sensational killing of William Woodward, Jr. by his wife, Ann Woodward in 1955. Directed by John Erman, the miniseries stars Ann-Margret, Elizabeth Ashley, Stephen Collins and Claudette Colbert in her final television role.

== Starring ==
- Ann-Margret as Ann Arden Grenville
- Claudette Colbert as Alice Grenville
- Stephen Collins as Billy Grenville Jr.
- John Rubinstein as Bratsie Bleeker
- Elizabeth Ashley as Babette Van Degan
- Penny Fuller as Cordelia Grenville Hardington
- Alan Oppenheimer as Sam Rosenthal
- Margaret Courtenay as Madame Sophia
- Delena Kidd as Tuchy Bainbridge
- Peter Eyre as Basil Plante
- Sam Wanamaker as District Attorney
- Manning Redwood as Detective Loomis
- Michael J. Shannon as Jack Fisher
- Faith Brook as Edith Brompton
- with Siân Phillips as Duchess of Windsor

== Awards and nominations ==
Emmy Awards (1987)

Won

- Outstanding Achievement in Hairstyling for a Miniseries or a Special (For part II) - Marsha Lewis (hairstylist), Mike Lockey (hairstylist), Sydney Guilaroff (hairstylist for Ann-Margret)
- Outstanding Art Direction for a Miniseries or a Special (For part II) - Malcolm Middleton (production designer), Herbert Westbrook (art director), Harry Cordwell (set decorator)

Nominated

- Outstanding Costume Design for a Miniseries or a Special (For part I) - Nolan Miller (for Ann-Margret), Donald Brooks (for Claudette Colbert), Sue Yelland
- Outstanding Lead Actress in a Miniseries or a Special - Ann-Margret
- Outstanding Miniseries - Susan G. Pollock (executive producer), John Erman (supervising producer), Preston Fischer (producer)
- Outstanding Sound Mixing for a Drama Miniseries or a Special (For part I) - John Asman (sound mixer), Neil Brody (sound mixer), Ken S. Polk (sound mixer), Peter Sutton (sound mixer)
- Outstanding Supporting Actor in a Miniseries or a Special - Stephen Collins
- Outstanding Supporting Actress in a Miniseries or a Special - Claudette Colbert

Golden Globes (1988)

Won

- Best Performance by an Actress in a Supporting Role in a Series, Mini-Series or Motion Picture Made for TV - Claudette Colbert

Nominated

- Best Performance by an Actress in a Mini-Series or Motion Picture Made for TV - Ann-Margret

American Cinema Editors (1988)

Nominated

- Eddie Best Edited Episode from a Television Mini-Series (For part II) - Jerrold L. Ludwig
