= William S. Paley =

American television executive (1901–1990)

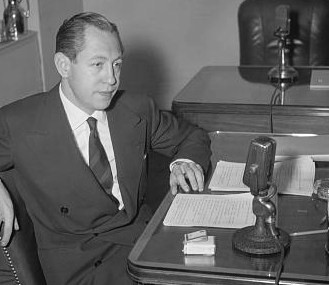
- Paley in 1939
- Born: William Samuel Paley; September 28, 1901; Chicago, Illinois, U.S.
- Died: October 26, 1990 (aged 89); New York City, U.S.
- Resting place: Memorial Cemetery of Saint John's Church
- Education: University of Pennsylvania
- Occupation: Television executive
- Known for: Founder of CBS
- Political party: Republican
- Spouses: Dorothy Hart Hearst (m. 1932; div. 1947) Barbara Cushing Mortimer (m. 1947; died 1978)
- Children: 4
- Awards: Carlos Manuel de Céspedes National Order of Merit of Cuba

William Samuel Paley (September 28, 1901 – October 26, 1990) was an American businessman, primarily involved in the media, and best known as the chief executive who built the Columbia Broadcasting System (CBS) from a small radio network into one of the foremost radio and television network operations in the United States.

== Early life and education ==
Paley was born on September 28, 1901, in Chicago, Illinois, the son of Goldie (née Drell) and Samuel Paley. His family was Jewish, and his father was an immigrant from Ukraine who ran a cigar company. As the company became increasingly successful, Samuel Paley became a millionaire, and moved his family to Philadelphia in the early 1920s.

William Paley attended the Western Military Academy in Alton, Illinois, then graduated from, the University of Pennsylvania, where he was a member of the Theta chapter of Zeta Beta Tau fraternity. He was expecting to take an increasingly active role running the family cigar business after college.

In 1927, Samuel Paley, Leon Levy (who was married to Paley's sister, Blanche), and some business partners bought a struggling Philadelphia-based radio network of 16 stations called the Columbia Phonographic Broadcasting System. Samuel Paley's intention was to use his acquisition as an advertising medium for promoting the family's cigar business, which included the La Palina brand. Within a year, under William's leadership, cigar sales had more than doubled, and, in 1928, the Paley family secured majority ownership of the network from their partners. Within a decade, William S. Paley had expanded the network to 114 affiliate stations.

== Career ==
=== Broadcasting ===
Paley quickly grasped the earnings potential of radio and recognized that good programming was the key to selling advertising time and, in turn, bringing in profits to the network and to affiliate owners. Before Paley, most businessmen viewed stations as stand-alone local outlets, as the broadcast equivalent of local newspapers. Individual stations originally bought programming from the network and, thus, were considered the network's clients.

Paley changed broadcasting's business model not only by developing successful and lucrative broadcast programming but also by viewing advertisers and sponsors as the most significant element of the broadcasting equation. Paley provided network programming to affiliate stations at a nominal cost, thereby ensuring the widest possible distribution for both the programming and the advertising. The advertisers then became the network's primary clients and, because of the wider distribution brought by the growing network, Paley was able to charge more for the ad time. Affiliates were required to carry programming offered by the network for part of the broadcast day, receiving a portion of the network's fees from advertising revenue. At other times in the broadcast day, affiliates were free to offer local programming and sell advertising time locally.

Paley's recognition of how to harness the potential reach of broadcasting was the key to his growing CBS from a tiny chain of stations into what was eventually one of the world's dominant communication empires. During his prime, Paley was described as having an uncanny sense for popular taste and exploiting that insight to build the CBS network. As war clouds darkened over Europe in the late 1930s, Paley recognized Americans' desire for news coverage of the coming war and built the CBS news division into a dominant force just as he had previously built the network's entertainment division.

As early as 1940 Paley envisioned the creation of a network division within CBS tasked with serving much of South America. In collaboration with his news director Paul White and his director of short wave operations Edmund Chester, Paley laid the foundation for a chain of sixty-four stations in eighteen countries which would subsequently be known as La Cadena de las Américas (The Network of the Americas). By 1942, Paley's innovative network was broadcasting both news and cultural programming live from CBS in New York City in cooperation with the government's Office of the Coordinator of Inter-American Affairs under the direction of a young Nelson Rockefeller. During World War II, these broadcasts played a central role in promoting cultural diplomacy and Pan-Americanism as part of President Franklin Roosevelt's Good Neighbor policy. In 1943, Paley and Chester were awarded the Carlos Manuel de Céspedes National Order of Merit by the Cuban government in recognition of his efforts to foster greater understanding between the peoples of Cuba and the United States of America, in recognition of services performed by the Columbia Broadcasting System's Latin-American shortwave radio network.

During World War II, Paley served as director of radio operations of the psychological warfare branch in the Office of War Information at Allied Force Headquarters in London, where he held the rank of colonel. While based in England during the war, Paley came to know and befriend Edward R. Murrow, CBS's head of European news, who expanded the news division's foreign coverage with a team of war correspondents later known as the Murrow Boys. In 1946, Paley promoted Frank Stanton to president of CBS. CBS expanded into television and rode the postwar TV boom to surpass NBC, which had dominated radio.

CBS has owned the Columbia Record Company and its associated CBS Laboratories since 1939. In June 1948, Columbia Records introduced the 33-1/3-rpm LP record, which could hold more than 20 minutes' worth of music on each side, and became a standard recording format through the 1970s. Also, CBS Laboratories and Peter Goldmark developed a method for color television. After lobbying by RCA President David Sarnoff and Paley in Washington, D.C., the Federal Communications Commission (FCC) approved the CBS system, but later reversed the decision based on the CBS system's incompatibility with black and white receivers. The new, compatible RCA color system was selected as the standard, and CBS sold the patents to its system to foreign broadcasters as PAL SECAM. CBS broadcast few color programs during this period, reluctant to supplement RCA revenue. They did, however, buy and license some RCA equipment and technology, taking the RCA markings off of the equipment, and later relying exclusively on Philips–Norelco for color equipment beginning in 1964, when color television sets became widespread. PAL or Phase Alternating Line, an analogue TV-encoding system, is today a television-broadcasting standard used in large parts of the world.

"Bill Paley erected two towers of power: one for entertainment and one for news", 60 Minutes creator Don Hewitt claimed in his autobiography, Tell Me a Story. "And he decreed that there would be no bridge between them.... In short, Paley was the guy who put Frank Sinatra and Edward R. Murrow on the radio and 60 Minutes on television."

Paley was not fond of one of the network's biggest stars. Arthur Godfrey had been working locally in Washington, D.C. and New York City hosting morning shows. Paley did not consider him worthy of CBS, being a mere local host. When Paley went into the Army and took up his assignment in London, and Frank Stanton assumed his duties, he decided to try Godfrey on the network. By the time Paley returned, Godfrey was a rising star on the network with his daily Arthur Godfrey Time program. Paley had to accept the entertainer, but the two were never friends. Godfrey would, on occasion, mock Paley and other CBS executives by name, on the air. Godfrey's massive revenues from advertising on the popular morning programs and his two prime-time shows Arthur Godfrey's Talent Scouts and Arthur Godfrey and his Friends, protected him from any reprisals. In private, Paley and his colleagues despised Godfrey.

The relationship between Paley and his news staff was not always smooth. His friendship with Edward R. Murrow, one of the leading lights in the CBS news division (and by then a vice president of CBS), suffered during the 1950s over the hard-hitting tone of the Murrow-hosted See It Now series. The implication was that the network's sponsors were uneasy about some of the controversial topics of the series, leading Paley to worry about lost revenue to the network as well as unwelcome scrutiny during the era of McCarthyism. In 1955, Alcoa withdrew its sponsorship of See It Now, and eventually the program's weekly broadcast on Tuesdays was stopped, though it continued as a series of special segments until 1958.

In 1959, James T. Aubrey became the president of CBS. Under Aubrey, the network became the most popular on television with shows like The Beverly Hillbillies and Gilligan's Island. However, Paley's personal favorite was Gunsmoke; in fact, he was such a fan of Gunsmoke that, upon its threatened cancellation in 1967, he demanded that it be reinstated, a dictum that led to the abrupt demise of Gilligan's Island, which had already been renewed for a fourth season.

During the 1963–1964 television season, 14 of the top 15 shows on prime-time and the top 12 shows of daytime television were on CBS. Aubrey, however, fought constantly with Fred W. Friendly of CBS News, and Paley did not like Aubrey's taste in low-brow programming. Aubrey and Paley bickered to the point that Aubrey approached Frank Stanton to propose a take-over of CBS. The takeover never materialized and, when CBS's ratings began to slip, Paley fired Aubrey in 1965.

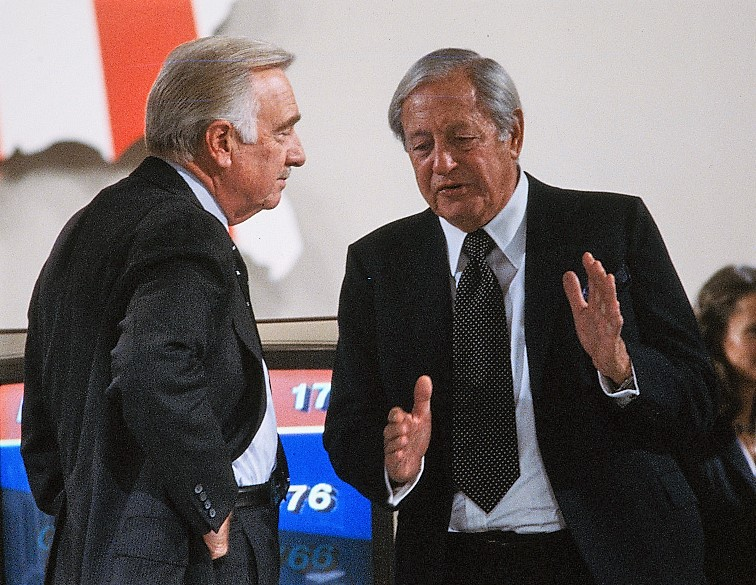
Walter Cronkite and Paley discussing CBS 1980 election coverage

In 1972, Paley ordered the shortening of the second installment of a two-part, in-depth CBS Evening News series on the Watergate scandal, following a complaint by Charles Colson, an aide to President Richard Nixon. And later, Paley briefly ordered the suspension of instant and often negatively critical analyses by CBS news commentators which followed presidential addresses.

Over the years, Paley sold portions of his family stockholding in CBS. At the time of his death, he owned less than nine percent of the outstanding stock. In 1995, five years after Paley's death, CBS was bought by Westinghouse Electric Corporation and, in 1999, by Viacom, which itself was once a subsidiary of CBS. Today, CBS is owned by Paramount Skydance.

== Art collection ==
Paley acquired an art collection consisting of approximately forty works, many of which are today in the Museum of Modern Art (MoMA) in New York. Paley's collection included works by Cézanne, Matisse, Picasso, Toulouse-Lautrec, Degas, Derain, Bonnard, Gauguin, and Rouault. He acquired Picasso's Boy Leading a Horse in 1936 and donated it to the MoMA in 1964 however its Nazi-era provenance turned out to be problematic and resulted in a claim for restitution filed by the heirs of Paul von Mendelssohn-Bartholdy who said it had been sold under duress. The lawsuit, known as Schoeps v. The Museum of Modern Art, was about to go to trial when a settlement between the parties was announced.

Other works from the Paley collection include Paul Cézanne's L'Estaque which he acquired in 1935, Henri Matisse's Woman with a Veil, which he acquired in 1936, Paul Gauguin's Washerwomen, which he acquired in 1958, and Paul Cézanne's Milk Can and Apples.

The MoMA organized a special exhibition of the William Paley Collection in 1992.

In 2022, twenty-nine artworks from the Paley collection, including five on long-term loan to the MoMA, were auctioned at Sotheby's on consignment from the William S. Paley Foundation.

== Philanthropy ==
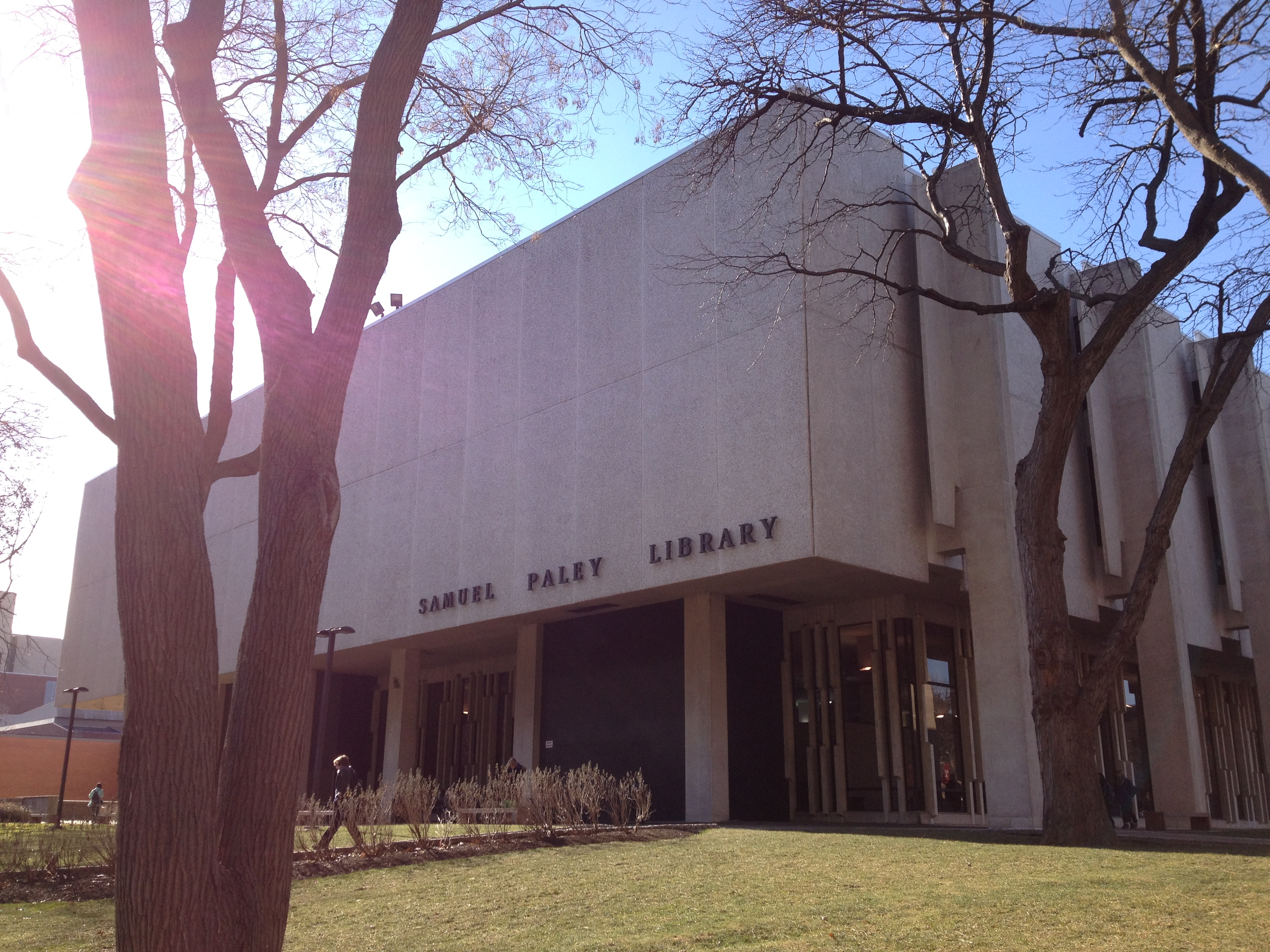
Samuel L. Paley library at Temple University, named for William S. Paley's father

Encouraged by Paley's avid interest in modern art and his outstanding collection, the Rockefeller family supported Museum of Modern Art made Paley a trustee in the 1930s; in 1962 he was tapped by then-chairman David Rockefeller to be its president. In 1968, he joined a syndicate with Rockefeller and others to buy six works by Picasso for the museum from the notable Gertrude Stein collection. He subsequently became chairman, stepping down from the museum post in 1985.

In 1974, Paley dedicated the second building at the Newhouse School of Public Communications at Syracuse University. He also personally dedicated the Samuel L. Paley library at Temple University named in honor of his father.

The Paley Center for Media was founded by Paley in New York City in 1976 as the Museum of Broadcasting. From 1991 to 2007, it was known as The Museum of Television and Radio; its new location was known as the Paley Building. An L.A. branch opened in 1996, and closed in 2020.

In 1947 William S. Paley was named chairman of the advisory council of the United Jewish Appeal for Refugees, Overseas Needs and Palestine.

== Other interests ==
In the 1940s, William Paley and his brother-in-law Leon Levy formed Jaclyn Stable, which owned and raced a string of thoroughbred race horses. He enjoyed photographing Picasso in Cap d'Antibes. Like Picasso, Paley drove an exotic French Facel Vega Facel II, the fastest four-seater car in the world in the early 1960s.

In 1964, CBS purchased the New York Yankees from Del Webb and Dan Topping. Subsequently, the storied baseball team fell into mediocrity, not making the postseason for the next ten years. In 1973, Paley sold the team at its low ebb for $8.7 million to Cleveland shipbuilder George Steinbrenner and a group of investors. Under the Steinbrenner regime, the Yankees grew in value to what, in April 2006, Forbes magazine estimated was $1.26 billion, or about $280 million in 1973 dollars.

== Personal life ==
=== Marriage to Dorothy Hart Hearst ===
Paley met Dorothy Hart Hearst (1908–1998) while she was married to John Randolph Hearst, the third son of William Randolph Hearst. Paley fell in love with her, and, after her Las Vegas divorce from Hearst, she and Paley married on May 12, 1932, in Kingman, Arizona.

Dorothy called on her extensive social connections acquired during her previous marriage to introduce Paley to several top members of President Franklin Roosevelt's government. She also exerted a considerable influence over Paley's political views. She later said: "I can't believe he would have voted Democrat without me."

Dorothy began to become estranged from Paley during the early 1940s because of his infidelity. They divorced on July 24, 1947, in Reno, Nevada. She retained custody of their two adopted children, Jeffrey Paley and Hilary Paley. In 1953, Dorothy married stockbroker Walter Hirshon; they divorced in 1961.

=== Marriage to Barbara Cushing Mortimer ===
Paley married divorcée, socialite and fashion icon Barbara Cushing Mortimer (1915–1978) affectionally referred to as "Babe" on July 28, 1947, and they remained married until her death. She was the daughter of renowned neurosurgeon Harvey Cushing. William and Babe Paley, in spite of their successes and social standing, were barred from being members of country clubs on Long Island because he was Jewish. As an alternative, the Paleys built a summer home, "Kiluna North", on Squam Lake in New Hampshire and spent the summers there for many years, routinely entertaining their many friends, including Lucille Ball, Grace Kelly, and David O. Selznick. The couple had two children, William and Kate.

=== Other affairs ===
Paley was a notorious womanizer his entire life. His first marriage to Dorothy ended when a newspaper published a suicide note written to Paley by a former girlfriend. He provided a small stipend to a former lover, actress Louise Brooks, for the rest of her life. In his later years he enjoyed keeping company with several women. Paley was included in a list of the ten most eligible bachelors compiled by Cosmopolitan magazine in 1985; the irony of the octogenarian Paley being on the list was an inspiration for Late Night with David Letterman's nightly Top Ten lists.

=== Death ===
Paley died of kidney failure on October 26, 1990, less than a month after his 89th birthday. He was buried at the Memorial Cemetery of St. John's Episcopal Church beside his second wife Babe.

== Works ==
- As It Happened: A Memoir (Garden City, New York: Doubleday, 1979)

== Awards and honors ==
- Carlos Manuel de Céspedes National Order of Merit by the Cuban government, 1943
- Croix de Guerre with Palm, 1946
- Legion of Honour
- Legion of Merit, 1946
- Peabody Award, 1958 and 1961
- Inducted into the Junior Achievement U.S. Business Hall of Fame, 1984
- Inducted into the Television Hall of Fame, 1984
- Walter Cronkite Award for Excellence in Journalism, 1984.

== In popular culture ==
- In the 1986 television movie Murrow, Paley is played by Dabney Coleman, while in the 2005 film Good Night, and Good Luck, he is played by Frank Langella. In the 2006 film Infamous, Paley is played by Lee Ritchey. Paley is also portrayed by Shawn Lawrence in the 2002 television film Gleason.
- The philandering character Sidney Dillon in Truman Capote's unfinished novel Answered Prayers is based on Paley.
- In "We Shall Overcome", an episode of the NBC series Dark Skies Paley (played by radio talk show host Art Bell) is presented as a member of the MJ-12 Committee.
- On AMC's series Mad Men, Harry Crane names Paley as the "most important" person he could ever bring into the office.
- The Museum of Television and Radio in New York City and Los Angeles were renamed the Paley Center for Media.
- Paley is portrayed by Treat Williams (his final role before his death) alongside Naomi Watts's portrayal of Babe Paley in the 2024 limited series FX/Ryan Murphy Feud: Capote vs. The Swans, which recounts the turmoil surrounding the writing of the Truman Capote novel Answered Prayers.

== See also ==
- History of television
