= Down There on a Visit =

1962 novel by Christopher Isherwood

- First UK edition
- Author: Christopher Isherwood
- Cover artist: Don Bachardy
- Language: English
- Publisher: Methuen
- Publication date: 1962
- Publication place: England
- Media type: Print (Hardback & Paperback)

Down There on a Visit is a novel written by the Anglo-American author Christopher Isherwood and published in 1962. The title refers to a jibe fired at Isherwood's protagonist by another character, Paul: "You know, you really are a tourist, to your bones," laughs Paul. "I bet you're always sending post cards with 'Down here on a visit' on them. That's the story of your life."

== Structure ==
In the novel Isherwood derives meaning and emotion from those around him. The novel's four sections describe four people who influenced him. Mr Lancaster introduces the young Christopher to the danger of asceticism. Ambrose inadvertently warns Christopher of isolationism. Waldemar embodies the surreality of heterosexual marriage. Finally, Isherwood encounters a famous male prostitute named Paul. The two men resolve to explore a regimented spiritual lifestyle centered on self-denial and meditation.

== Plot ==
Throughout the novel Isherwood is a character of extremes. At times he pursues physical pleasure, relentlessly devoting himself to debauchery, but he interrupts these binges with periods of discipline, learning German or regularly meditating. Somehow his abandon never leads to personal disaster. The second section of the novel contains a scene that illustrates this pattern. Isherwood is visiting an island where a crew of inane Greeks blast rock for the foundations of a mansion. He observes that:

Despite all their experience, they seem to have no idea how much dynamite they should use. It is always too little or too much. We become completely indifferent to their yells of warning, followed by an absurd little firecracker pop. And then, just when you're least expecting it, there will be a stunning explosion which shakes the whole island and sends big rocks spinning through the air... A couple of times things have been smashed, but no one has been hurt, so far.

== Characters ==
As in Prater Violet the main character, Isherwood himself, is a moderately successful author of fiction. He is fascinated by people and travel and pleasure.

Other characters include Mr Lancaster, Waldemar, Ambrose (based on the archaeologist Francis Turville-Petre), Hans, Aleko, Geoffrey, Paul (based on a real-life male prostitute, Denham Fouts), Augustus (based on the academic Gerald Heard), Ronny (based on the painter Tony Bower) and Ruthie (based on the socialite Jean Connolly).
