= Stanley Siegel (talk show host) =

American newscaster and interviewer (1936–2016)

Stanley Milton Siegel (October 2, 1936 – January 2, 2016) was a radio reporter, newscaster and television talk show host, who hosted programs on New York City's WABC-TV and WCBS-TV from 1975 to 1980.

== Career ==
Siegel's interviews challenged his guests, which included transgender tennis player Renée Richards, U.S. senator Henry M. Jackson, authors Gloria Steinem, Truman Capote, Norman Mailer, LSD advocate Timothy Leary, bodybuilder and stripper Kellie Everts, and actress Marlo Thomas. Siegel's other programs included America Talks Back on Lifetime and the travel show Stanley on the Go for RLTV.
