= Answered Prayers =

1986 novel by Truman Capote

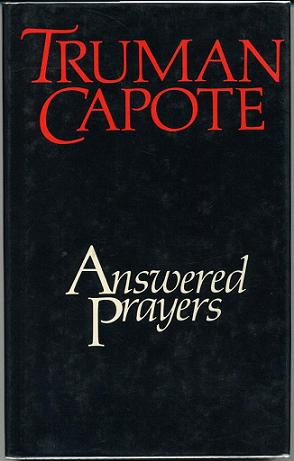
- First Edition
- Author: Truman Capote
- Cover artist: Craig Dodd
- Language: English
- Publisher: Hamish Hamilton (London)
- Publication date: 1986
- Publication place: United States
- Media type: Print (hardback & paperback)
- Pages: 181
- ISBN: 0-241-11962-6 (Paperback edition)
- OCLC: 29357384

Answered Prayers is an unfinished novel by American author Truman Capote, published posthumously in 1986 in England and 1987 in the United States.

== History ==
The title of the book is taken from the novel's epigraph, "More tears are shed over answered prayers than unanswered ones", attributed to Saint Teresa of Avila.

According to Random House senior editor Joseph M. Fox, Capote signed the initial contract for the novel on January 5, 1966—envisioned as a contemporary American analog to Marcel Proust's In Search of Lost Time. This agreement provided a $25,000 advance with a stipulated delivery date of January 1, 1968.

Distracted by the unprecedented success of his "nonfiction novel" In Cold Blood amid the gestation of the Black and White Ball (at the Plaza Hotel in November 1966), various television projects, short pieces and increasing personal demons, Capote missed his 1968 deadline. In July 1969, the superannuated 1966 contract was renegotiated, granting a "substantially larger" $750,000 advance in exchange for a trilogy to be delivered in January 1973. The delivery date was further delayed to January 1974 and then September 1977. A final agreement in early 1980 would have yielded Capote $1 million to have been paid only if he submitted the manuscript by March 1, 1981. This final deadline was not kept.

On The Dick Cavett Show in May 1971, Capote referred to the book as his "posthumous novel", explaining, "either I'm going to kill it, or it's going to kill me".

The book is a tale of the mixing of high and low social classes, drawn from his experiences as best friend and confidant to prominent female socialites of the era and their husbands. The first chapter ("Unspoiled Monsters") chronicles the "picaresque" exploits of P.B. Jones, a young writer (enmeshed in the process of writing a novel, Answered Prayers) and "bisexual hustler" who "beds men and women alike if they can further his literary career" in the 1940s New York literary milieu; accordingly, both Katherine Anne Porter and Tennessee Williams are depicted in a vituperative light. Jones (who later appears as the main interlocutor in "La Cote Basque") is believed to be a composite of Capote, Perry Smith from In Cold Blood, and Capote's late friend Denham Fouts. The eponymous protagonist of the comparatively obfuscatory chapter "Kate McCloud" (and the ostensible heroine of the novel) was inspired by Mona von Bismarck, the eldest of Capote's society friends.

By 1975, Capote's increasingly outrageous public behavior—fueled by alcohol, drugs and sexual indiscretion—led many to believe that he had no intention of ever publishing Answered Prayers and had essentially given up writing. Capote sold four chapters ("Mojave", "La Cote Basque", "Unspoiled Monsters", and "Kate McCloud") of the novel-in-progress to Esquire at the behest of Gordon Lish in 1975 and 1976. "Mojave" was published in the magazine's June 1975 issue to little fanfare. However, with the publication of "La Cote Basque" in the November 1975 issue, there was an uproar of shock and anger among Capote's friends and acquaintances, who recognized thinly veiled characters based on themselves. Both "Mojave" and "La Cote Basque" were exposés of the dysfunctional personal lives led by the author's social benefactors, including CBS head William S. Paley, his wife Babe (then terminally ill with cancer), Gloria Vanderbilt (depicted as being insufferably vacuous), Happy Rockefeller, and Ann Woodward. The Paleys never again socialized with Capote, and they led an exodus of ostracizing friends. Subsequently, "Unspoiled Monsters" and "Kate McCloud" were published in the periodical in May 1976 and December 1976, respectively.

From a literary viewpoint the chapters received mixed reactions. Some, like Capote biographer Gerald Clarke, consider Answered Prayers to be the culmination of the factual novel form first employed by the author with In Cold Blood and a testimonial to his talent's ability to transcend substance abuse. Norman Mailer praised Capote's technique but questioned the seemingly frivolous plotline of escapades among the socially outmoded jet set.

== Composition ==
In the introduction to his 1980 collection, Music for Chameleons, Capote detailed the writing process of the novel:

For four years, roughly from 1968 through 1972, I spent most of my time reading and selecting, rewriting and indexing my own letters, other people's letters, my diaries and journals (which contain detailed accounts of hundreds of scenes and conversations) for the years 1943 through 1965... in 1972 I began work on [Answered Prayers] by writing the last chapter [presumably "Father Flanagan's All-Night Nigger Queen Kosher Cafe"] first (it's always good to know where one is going). Then I wrote the first chapter, "Unspoiled Monsters". Then the fifth, "A Severe Insult to the Brain". Then the seventh, "La Cote Basque". I went on in this manner, writing different chapters out of sequence. I was able to do this only because the plot—or rather plots—was true, and all the characters were real... I hadn't invented anything...

If this chronology is to be believed, Capote stopped work on Answered Prayers in September 1977 after suffering what he considered to be a "nervous breakdown". After a period of consideration and reorganization, he claimed to have completed substantial revisions on the chapters published in Esquire with the exception of "Mojave", a vignette situated outside of the diegetic framework of the novel that was intended to be the second chapter before Capote elected to excise it from the work; in 1980, it was republished as a standalone short story in Music for Chameleons.

However, further evidence makes Capote's statements seem less credible. Fox corroborates Capote to a large extent and claimed to have seen all four of the Esquire chapters in 1975, but Gerald Clarke's biography indicates that only the recently written "Mojave" and "La Cote Basque" were in any sort of publishable condition by that date. (Nevertheless, both "Unspoiled Monsters" and "Kate McCloud" were published in 1976, a period coinciding with one of the lowest ebbs in Capote's personal life.) Capote's legendary and almost stenographic journals, considered by a minority of friends to have been the foundation of his literary output, have never surfaced after his death, let alone in a revised form. By all accounts, he spent those years in a drug- and alcohol-induced haze.

== Theories regarding missing chapters ==
Comparable in length to Capote's earlier works of long fiction, the three chapters published in Esquire were collected by Random House in 1987 as Answered Prayers: The Unfinished Novel. An unpublished short narrative bearing the title of one of the missing chapters ("Yachts and Things") was later found among Capote's papers in the Manuscripts and Archives Division of the New York Public Library and published in the December 2012 issue of Vanity Fair, which billed it as the long-lost work. Apart from its title, however, the piece appears to be a separate work, and in 2013 it was added to a Modern Library edition of The Complete Stories of Truman Capote as a self-contained story.

Revised versions of the Esquire chapters and "Yachts and Things" that were purported to have existed, along with "A Severe Insult to the Brain" (a vignette about Jerry Zipkin, a prominent real estate heir, social escort, and friend of Nancy Reagan); "And Audrey Wilder Sang" (an account of "the beautiful people of Hollywood and New York... and how they're not so beautiful"); and "Father Flanagan's..." (the final chapter) have never been located. In the years prior to his death, Capote frequently read from these chapters to friends at dinners, but such was his gift of storytelling that few could discern whether he was actually reading from a manuscript or improvising. He arranged to sell "Father Flanagan's..." to Esquire during Clay Felker's editorship in the early 1980s for $35,000; although he claimed that he only "needed to tighten a few screws," the excerpt was never submitted. Capote alleged that lover John O'Shea had absconded with "A Severe Insult to the Brain" in 1977 and subsequently sued for repossession, but he eventually reconciled with O'Shea and dropped the lawsuit in 1981. According to Joseph Fox, at least four of Capote's friends (including John Knowles and Lester Persky) reportedly read or listened to Capote read selections from "some of the... chapters... probably 'Father Flanagan's All-Night Nigger Queen Kosher Cafe' and 'A Severe Insult to the Brain,'" while Persky professed to have copied and bound a complete manuscript that subsequently vanished.

Longtime Capote confidante Joanne Carson contended that she read three "very long" chapters ("And Audrey Wilder Sang", "Yachts and Things", and "Father Flanagan's...") that completed the novel in the early 1980s. On the morning preceding his death, Capote handed a key to Carson for a safe deposit box or locker that contained the completed novel, stating that "[the chapters] will be found when they want to be found." When Carson pressed Capote for a precise location, he proffered myriad locations in various locales that he frequented, including Manhattan, Palm Springs, Los Angeles and New Orleans. An exhaustive search for the manuscript after Capote's death yielded nothing.

In his editor's note, Fox "hesitantly" theorized that the chapters did exist at one juncture but were "deliberately destroyed" by Capote in the early 1980s. Andreas Brown likewise believes that Capote, a trenchant perfectionist, "may well have destroyed the manuscripts" during his intermittent periods of sobriety.

A third and less tantalizing belief held by a minority of Capote's friends (including Andy Warhol and Capote's life partner Jack Dunphy) was that the high-society backlash that followed the publication of "La Cote Basque" so traumatized Capote that he ceased all work on Answered Prayers after finishing "Kate McCloud" and was incapable of finishing it. In his diary, Warhol made frequent mention of drunken ramblings related to the novel by Capote, but he never was able to secure any serious plot details. He did discuss the contents of one of the chapters with Brigid Berlin, and Warhol was incensed that she did not tape the discussion.

== In popular culture ==
The fall-out of the book, as well as the contents, is dramatized in the second season of the American anthology television series Feud, subtitled Capote vs. The Swans.
