= Lily Cushing =

American artist (1909–1969)

- Born: Lily Dulany Emmet Cushing; 1909; New York City
- Died: 1969 (aged 59–60); Fishers Island, New York

Lily Dulany Emmet Cushing (1909–1969) was an American artist. Her work is included in the collections of the Smithsonian American Art Museum and the Museum of Modern Art, New York. Her personal papers are held by the Smithsonian's Archives of American Art.
