= William Woodward Jr. =

American banker (1920–1955)

- Woodward with his wife Ann
- Born: June 12, 1920
- Died: October 30, 1955 (aged 35); Oyster Bay, New York, U.S.
- Cause of death: Gunshot
- Resting place: Woodlawn Cemetery
- Education: Groton School
- Alma mater: Harvard University
- Occupations: Banker, horse breeder
- Spouse: Ann Crowell (m. 1943)
- Children: 2
- Parent(s): William Woodward Sr. Elizabeth "Elsie" Cryder

William Woodward Jr. (June 12, 1920 – October 31, 1955) was an heir and businessman, once regarded as America's most eligible bachelor, who was accidentally shot to death by his wife, Ann Woodward, in what Life magazine called the "Shooting of the Century". Along with the Hanover National Bank (later Manufacturer's Hanover) fortune, he inherited the Belair Estate and stud farm and legacy.

== Early years and career ==
Billy Woodward was the only son of William Woodward Sr. and his wife, Elizabeth Ogden "Elsie" Cryder. His mother was one of the "Cryder triplets" of New York City society fame. His father was president and director of the Hanover Bank of New York, and was secretary to the ambassador to the Court of St. James's during the reign of Edward VII. Woodward Sr. frequented the race track with the king, and they developed a close friendship.

Woodward was educated at Buckley School and Groton School, and graduated from Harvard University. After graduation, he fought in the United States Navy during World War II. There, he received a Purple Heart after a torpedo attack on his ship, the USS Liscome Bay. After leaving the navy, Woodward became a director of Hanover Bank. A young, tall, wealthy man, he was considered by some to be the most eligible bachelor in America, and eventually became one of the country's finest horse breeders. On the senior Woodward's death in 1953, Woodward inherited Belair Mansion and stud farm in Collington, Maryland, the oldest in America, along with the thoroughbred horse Nashua.

== Personal life ==
During his naval service, Woodward met Ann Eden Crowell (born Angeline Lucille Crowell), a Powers model and stage and radio actress who also danced as a showgirl in upscale Manhattan nightclubs. There were rumors that Ann was initially Woodward Sr.'s mistress and that he passed her along to his son. Woodward Sr. did in fact set his son up with Ann, much to the displeasure of his wife Elsie, who thought Ann was a gold digger. The couple announced their engagement on March 6, 1943, and were married two weeks later. They had two sons, William "Woody" III (born July 1944) and James "Jimmy" (born January 1947).

The Woodward marriage was reportedly turbulent. Both had affairs, drank frequently and often argued publicly. Ann also began abusing prescription drugs.

== Shooting and death ==
After attending a dinner party for the Duchess of Windsor on October 30, 1955, Woodward and his wife returned to their home, the Playhouse, in Oyster Bay, New York. Both were nervous about reports of a prowler roaming nearby estates, including their own. The Woodwards, both avid hunters, each went to their separate bedrooms that evening with loaded shotguns.

A few hours later, Ann heard a noise on the roof and went into a darkened hallway with her gun, where she saw a shadowy figure standing in front of Woodward's bedroom door. Believing the figure to be a prowler, Ann fired the gun, killing her husband. Upon arriving at the home, police found Ann holding her husband's body and sobbing. She immediately confessed that she had shot her husband because she thought he was a burglar.

Police later arrested a man named Paul Wirths, who admitted that he had attempted to break into the Woodwards' house on the night of the shooting. Wirths confessed that he had been on the roof above Ann Woodward's bedroom and was climbing into a hallway window, when he was frightened by the sound of gunshots and then left. Woodward's mother Elsie, however, initially believed that the shooting had been deliberate but publicly supported her daughter-in-law in order to avoid further scandal. There was speculation that Elsie had paid Wirths to say he had attempted to break into the home in an effort to exonerate Ann.

Three weeks after the shooting, Ann testified before a grand jury and maintained that the shooting was an accident and that she thought her husband was an intruder. The grand jury determined that no crime had been committed.

Elsie ultimately said “I know Ann loved Billy very much and the shooting could be nothing but an accident.”

== Aftermath ==
The shooting of Woodward immediately became a cause célèbre and was detailed extensively by the mainstream media and tabloid newspapers. Life magazine called the episode "The Shooting of the Century". The story was also frequently gossiped about within the Woodwards' social circle, who speculated that Ann intentionally shot her husband to obtain his money. Despite the fact that she was never charged and was cleared of wrongdoing by a grand jury, Ann was banished from New York high society. The tale followed Ann everywhere and people continued to speculate about her guilt. She spent her remaining years traveling and having relationships with younger men.

The case returned to public attention when, in 1975, chapters of author Truman Capote's novel Answered Prayers were set to be published in Esquire magazine's November issue. The book features thinly veiled characters based on Capote's friends in high society. Capote was an acquaintance of Ann and had become convinced that she was guilty of murder (he nicknamed her "Bang Bang"). Capote created a character based on Ann named "Ann Hopkins", who is described as a bigamist and "cold blooded murderess" who shoots her husband after the two arrive home one night from a party. Ann Hopkins also claims that she mistook her husband for a burglar when, in reality, she kills her husband because he confronted her with evidence that she had never divorced her first husband, which would force her to give him a divorce so he could remarry. Despite Capote's claims that "almost everything" in Answered Prayers was true, there is no evidence that Ann burgled the neighboring estates herself to create an excuse that a prowler was at large, then deliberately shot her husband to death in the shower and subsequently moved his body into the hallway. Nor is there any evidence of any prior marriage that would have made the Woodward union bigamous.

Upon learning of the impending publication of Answered Prayers, Ann Woodward consumed a cyanide pill on October 9, 1975. "Well, that's that", said her mother-in-law, Elsie Woodward, "she shot my son, and Truman just murdered her, and so now I suppose we don't have to worry about that anymore." However, Ann's friends said that she was already suffering from severe depression, which Capote's story exacerbated.

Both of the couple's children, William "Woody" III and James "Jimmy" Woodward, were asleep at the family home at the time of the shooting. Neither was awakened by the gunshot. Like their mother, gossip and speculation about their father's death followed them for the rest of their lives. Three years after Ann's suicide, Jimmy jumped to his death from a ninth-story window in 1978 at age 31. Woody also took his own life in the same manner, in 1999 at 54 years of age. Woodward, Ann, and their sons are buried in the Woodward family plot in Woodlawn Cemetery in the Bronx.

== In popular culture ==
Truman Capote's novel Answered Prayers features a character based on Woodward's wife Ann and includes a fictionalized account of Woodward's death. Dominick Dunne's 1985 novel The Two Mrs. Grenvilles is also a fictionalized account of the shooting which was made into a television miniseries in 1987. The case was detailed in the 1992 non-fiction book This Crazy Thing Called Love by Susan Braudy, which argues through detailed research for Ann Woodward’s innocence and that Capote’s story was entirely invented. The series A Crime to Remember on Investigation Discovery featured the story of Ann and Billy Woodward in an episode named "Who Killed Mr. Woodward", which first aired on December 17, 2013. The case was made into an episode of Dominick Dunne's Power, Privilege, and Justice.

Ian Fleming, the author of James Bond books, dedicated Diamonds Are Forever to Woodward after he took the author to Saratoga Race Course, which became a plot line in the book.
