= Frederick Lothrop Ames Jr. =

American manufacturing businessperson (1876–1921)

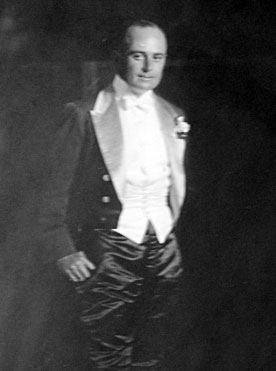
- Ames in 1921
- Born: July 23, 1876; North Easton, Massachusetts, U.S.
- Died: June 19, 1921 (aged 44); North Easton, Massachusetts, U.S.
- Resting place: North Easton Village Cemetery in North Easton, Massachusetts, U.S.
- Education: Harvard College
- Spouse: Edith Callender Cryder
- Parent(s): Frederick Lothrop Ames and Rebecca Caroline Blair

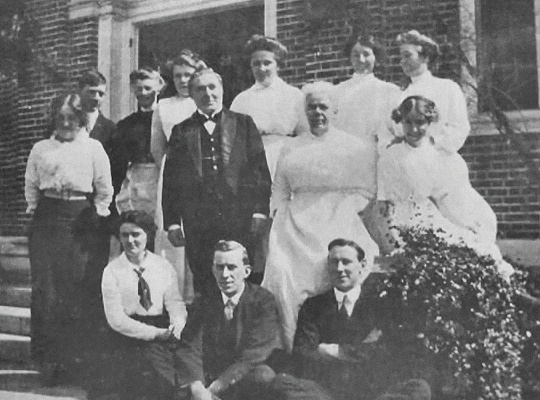
House servants at Stonehouse Hill estate in 1914

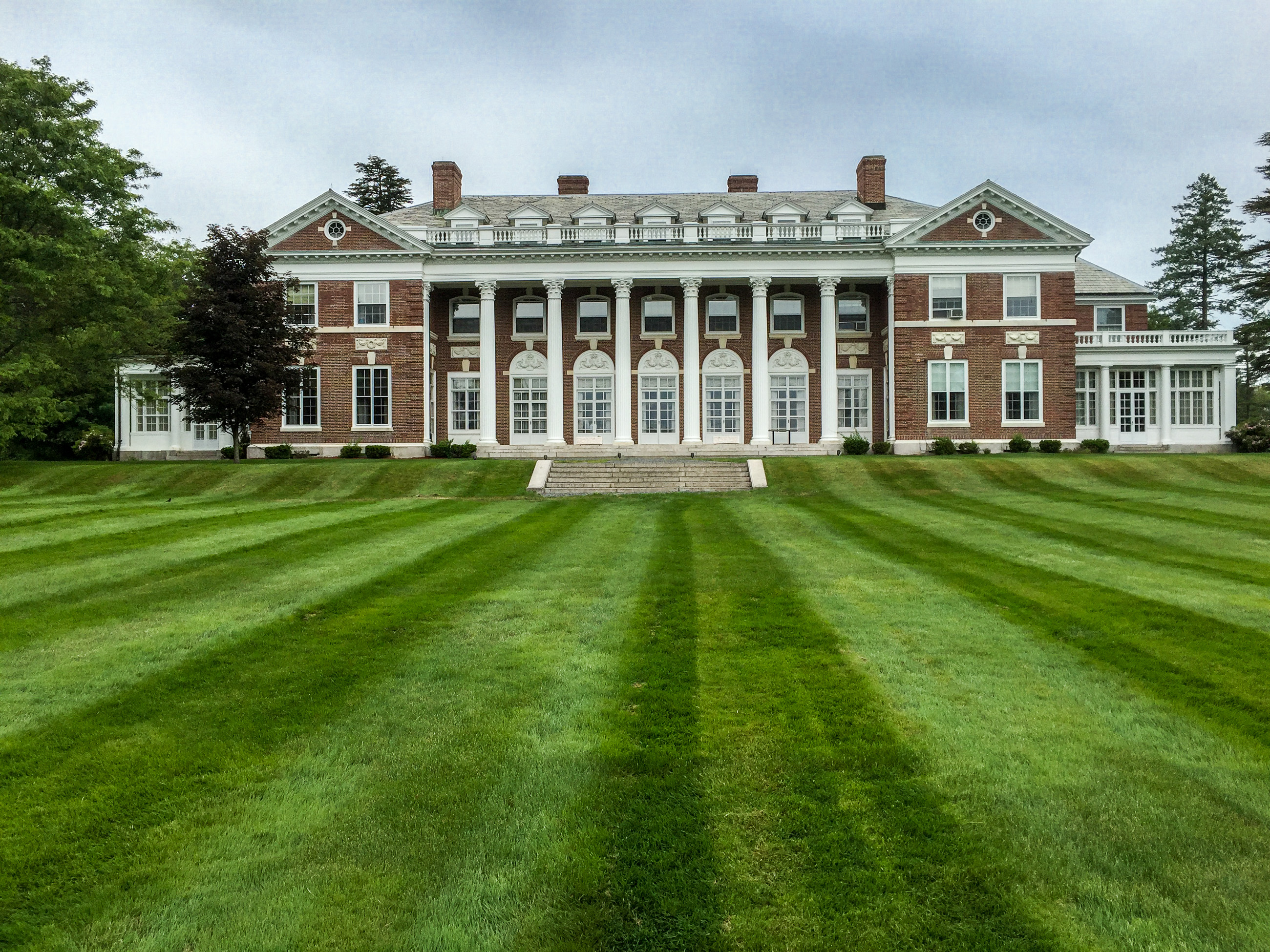
Stone House Hill House, now part of Stonehill College

Frederick Lothrop Ames Jr. (July 23, 1876 – June 19, 1921) was a Massachusetts financier and socialite. He was the great-grandson of Oliver Ames, who established the Ames Shovel Company, grandson of Oliver Ames Jr., and son of Frederick Lothrop Ames.

== Early life and education ==
Frederick Lothrop Ames Jr. was born July 23, 1876, in North Easton, Massachusetts. He was the second son of Frederick Lothrop Ames Sr. and Rebecca Caroline (Blair) Ames, and went by the name "Lothrop." The Ames' were fairly prominent in 19th century New England society, and had a major presence in small North Easton. Lothrop's father Frederick Sr. was considered by many to be the wealthiest man in Massachusetts. Frederick Sr. died at age 58 in 1893, leaving young Lothrop fatherless and extremely wealthy at age seventeen.

Lothrop received an A.B. degree from Harvard College in 1898. In 1902, he purchased the yacht Vigilant, which had won the America's Cup back in 1893.

== Career ==
Lothrop had interests in the family shovel business and served on the boards of directors of many companies, including banks, mining companies, railroads, power companies, hospitals, dredging companies, and others. He was involved with the breeding of Guernsey cattle and was a prominent member of the Massachusetts Guernsey Breeders Association. Lothrop kept an office in the family-owned Ames Building in Boston.

== Stone House Hill House ==
In 1904, shortly after his marriage to Edith Cryder, Lothrop commissioned architects Douglas H. Thomas and J. Harleston Parker, later of the firm Parker, Thomas and Rice) to design a mansion on the Easton-Brockton town line. The 50-room “Stone House Hill House” contained a gymnasium with glass-roofed indoor clay tennis court, marble swimming pool, squash court, garage, conservatory, barns and maintenance buildings. The building was completed in 1905.

By 1935, Ames was deceased and Edith remarried. She sold the entire Stone House Hill House and property to the Catholic Congregation of Holy Cross. Between 1935 and 1948, the congregation used the place as a seminary to educate candidates for the priesthood. In 1948, the Congregation of Holy Cross established Stonehill College on the property.

== Personal life ==
He married Edith Callender Cryder, one of the Cryder triplets, a daughter of Duncan Cryder of New York City, on May 31, 1904, at Trinity Church in New York City. They had two children, Frederick and Mary.

=== Death ===
Lothrop took ill on May 1, 1921, had surgery on May 6, appeared to recover on June 11, but died on June 19 at his home in North Easton. His funeral was held June 22 at the Unity Church of North Easton, which his family had attended for many years. He was buried at the Village Cemetery behind the church.

== See also ==
- Ames family
