= Black and White Ball =

1966 New York masquerade ball

The Black and White Ball was a masquerade ball held on November 28, 1966, at the Plaza Hotel in New York City. Hosted by author Truman Capote, the ball was in honor of The Washington Post publisher Katharine Graham.

== Impulse ==
Truman Capote decided in June 1966 to throw a lavish party. He was at the height of his popularity as an author and as a public figure following the publication of his non-fiction novel, In Cold Blood, earlier that year. For the first time Capote had the financial resources to host a party he deemed worthy of the friends he had cultivated in high society.

According to Capote's friend, the writer and editor Leo Lerman, Capote had declared in 1942 on a journey to the writer's colony Yaddo that when he, Capote, became rich and famous he would throw a party for his rich and famous friends. Capote always discounted the story, but, through constant repetition, it became part of the ball's legend.

Capote's friend, author Dominick Dunne and his wife Lenny had given an extravagant, no-expense-spared, black and white ball at their Santa Monica home in 1964 for their tenth wedding anniversary. Attendees at the Dunnes' ball included such luminaries as Ronald and Nancy Reagan, the Bloomingdales, Peter Lawford and Patricia Kennedy, David Niven, Tony Curtis, Natalie Wood and Hope Lange to name but a few. Capote attended with Alvin Dewey and others he had met while researching In Cold Blood. Capote, however, did not invite the Dunnes to his ball in 1966. Capote was also inspired by the "Ascot scene" from the film My Fair Lady in which the women were all dressed in black and white.

== Planning ==
After deciding to throw the party, Capote had to select a guest of honor. Throwing the party for himself would have been viewed by his society friends as vulgar. Rather than selecting from amongst his stable of beautiful society women he called his "swans", Capote chose The Washington Post publisher Katharine Graham. "Truman called me up that summer and said, 'I think you need cheering up. And I'm going to give you a ball.'...I was...sort of baffled....I felt a little bit like Truman was going to give the ball anyway and that I was part of the props."

For his venue, Capote chose the Grand Ballroom of the Plaza Hotel in New York City. Capote had long held a deep affection for the Plaza, even setting the opening scene of his attempted first novel, Summer Crossing, in a Plaza dining room. Capote enlisted Evie Backer, who had decorated his apartment at United Nations Plaza, for the event's decor. Initially Capote planned to cover the ballroom's white and gold walls with heavy red drapes but Backer and Capote's friend Babe Paley convinced him to abandon this idea. Instead he brought in the color with red tablecloths. Rather than flowers, Capote had the tables adorned with gold candelabra wound with smilax and bearing white tapers. The menu, to be served at midnight, consisted of scrambled eggs, sausages, biscuits, pastries, spaghetti and meatballs and chicken hash, a specialty of the Plaza and one of Capote's favorite dishes. To drink, Capote laid in 450 bottles of Taittinger champagne.

Capote spent $16,000 on the ball (roughly $150,000 in 2024).

== Guest list ==
Capote purchased a black-and-white composition book and spent most of July sitting by his friend Eleanor Friede's pool compiling his initial guest list. Capote carried the book with him everywhere he went for the next three months, constantly adding and deleting names.

Below is a partial guest list:

=== Actors, film directors and producers ===
- Lauren Bacall
- Tallulah Bankhead
- Marisa Berenson
- Candice Bergen
- Richard Brooks
- Johnny Carson & wife Joanne Carson
- Mia Farrow
- Henry Fonda
- Joan Fontaine
- Arlene Francis
- Irving Paul Lazar
- Joshua Logan
- Joseph L. Mankiewicz
- Vincente Minnelli
- Phyllis Newman
- Harold Prince
- Sam Spiegel
- George Stevens
- Darryl F. Zanuck

=== Businesspeople ===
- Henry Ford II
- Stanley Marcus
- Stavros Niarchos
- William S. Paley
- Guy de Rothschild
- Edward Bennett Williams

=== Journalists ===
- Stewart Alsop
- Ben Bradlee
- William F. Buckley Jr.
- Herb Caen
- Walter Cronkite
- Jason Epstein
- Rowland Evans
- Katharine Graham
- Harold Hayes
- Walter Lippmann
- Aileen Mehle
- Agnes E. Meyer
- Samuel Irving Newhouse Sr.
- George Plimpton
- Norman Podhoretz
- James Reston
- Robert B. Silvers
- Gloria Steinem
- Arthur Ochs Sulzberger
- Diana Vreeland

=== Political figures ===
- David K. E. Bruce
- McGeorge Bundy
- John Sherman Cooper
- C. Douglas Dillon
- Richard N. Goodwin
- W. Averell Harriman
- William vanden Heuvel
- Jacob Javits
- Lady Bird Johnson
- Nicholas Katzenbach
- William P. Rogers
- Arthur M. Schlesinger Jr.
- Sargent Shriver
- Ted Sorensen
- Llewellyn Thompson
- Jack Valenti

=== Royalty ===
- Carlo Caracciolo
- Gayatri Devi
- Serge Obolensky
- the former Edward VIII, the Duke of Windsor & wife Wallis Simpson
- Luciana Pignatelli
- Stanisław Albrecht Radziwiłł

=== Socialites ===
- Marella Agnelli
- Brooke Astor
- C. Z. Guest
- Gloria Guinness
- Slim Keith
- Patricia Kennedy Lawford
- Alice Roosevelt Longworth
- Babe Paley
- Lee Radziwill
- Gloria Vanderbilt

=== Writers, artists and musicians ===
- Edward Albee
- Richard Avedon
- Cecil Beaton
- Irving Berlin
- Leonard Bernstein
- Bennett Cerf
- Sammy Davis Jr.
- Jack Dunphy (Capote's partner)
- Ralph Ellison
- Adolph Green
- Lillian Hellman
- Christopher Isherwood
- Alan Jay Lerner
- Robert Lowell
- Norman Mailer
- Robert Merrill
- Arthur Miller
- Marianne Moore
- John O'Hara
- Gordon Parks
- Oscar de la Renta
- Jerome Robbins
- Irwin Shaw
- Frank Sinatra
- Stephen Sondheim
- Jean Stein
- John Steinbeck
- Lionel Trilling
- Andy Warhol
- Edmund Wilson

== November 28, 1966 ==
Leading up to the ball, many guests attended one of sixteen small private dinner parties that Capote's friends had been drafted to host.

== Aftermath ==
The Black and White Ball was credited for an immediate upsurge in masquerade and costume parties. It has been described as "a pinnacle of New York's social history". Six days after the ball, on the December 4 episode of the television panel show What's My Line?, panelist Arlene Francis wore the mask she had worn at the party, transformed into a blindfold. The wearing of blindfolds during the show's special Mystery Guest segment was customary on the part of the panel.

== Re-creations ==
Yasmin Aga Khan hosted a Black and White Ball in 1991, commemorating the 25th anniversary of the original. The ball, held in a tent outside Tavern on the Green, was a charity event that raised $1.4 million for the Alzheimer's Association.

In anticipation of selling the contents of the Plaza Hotel, Christie's Auction House recreated the Black and White Ball in 2006 at Rockefeller Center. The event followed Capote's dress code, schedule and menu exactly and the Peter Duchin Orchestra, which had played the original, played the recreation.

TV chef Ina Garten recreated a scaled-down version of the event for a themed dinner party on her daytime cookery show Barefoot Contessa. She served chicken hash followed by French toast and truffles for dessert, in keeping with the black and white theme of Capote's party.

The Black and White Ball is recreated and featured in episode 3 of Capote vs. The Swans, the second season of the anthology series Feud, based on Laurence Leamer's book, Capote's Women.
