= The Dogs Bark =

Anthology by Truman Capote

The Dogs Bark(Anthology)
- First edition cover
- Author: Truman Capote
- Language: English
- Genre: Collection
- Publisher: Random House
- Publication date: 1973
- Publication place: United States
- Media type: Print (Hardback & Paperback)
- Pages: 419 pp
- ISBN: 978-0-452-25161-8
- OCLC: 3532337

The Dogs Bark: Public People and Private Places is an anthology of works by American author Truman Capote. It was published on September 12, 1973 and includes essays from Local Color and Observations, as well as The Muses Are Heard.

== Conception ==
The work is largely retrospective look at Truman Capote's life spanning the time frame from 1942 to 1972. The title, inspired by the author André Gide is taken from an Arab proverb: "The dogs bark, but the caravan moves on."

== Reception and critical analysis ==
Lis Harris when writing for The New Yorker said: "Capote describes these pieces as "silhouettes and souvenirs" and "a written geography of my life"—a somewhat diaphanous description, but, like most of Capote's nonfiction writing, completely apt. The title is taken from a French proverb: "les chiens aboient; la caravane passe" ("The dogs bark but the caravan moves on": Gide to Capote one day in Tangiers when Capote was grumbling about a bad review), and most of the pieces are about people and places Capote has observed while moving on since 1942. Though large and covering a long period of time, this book is innocent of political or social opinions of any sort; if Capote has any, he has always kept them out of his writing; and there is a certain shallowness to the collection because of it. It bulges, however, with sharp, subtle observations of people, fascinating reminiscences and travel jottings, wonderful sketches, anecdotes and yarns, and, among other things, the most frightening horror story you've ever heard. Not a deep plate of soup, perhaps, but a marvelously tasty one."
