= Brooklyn Heights: A Personal Memoir =

Book by Truman Capote

- Author: Truman Capote
- Illustrator: photographer David Attie
- Language: English
- Subject: autobiography
- Published: February 1959 Holiday Magazine
- Publication place: United States
- Media type: magazine (1959), anthology (1995), print hardback (2002), photo book (2015)
- OCLC: 32990674
- Preceded by: Breakfast at Tiffany's
- Followed by: Observations

Brooklyn Heights: A Personal Memoir is an autobiographical essay by Truman Capote about his life in Brooklyn in the late 1950s. While it was eventually combined with the original photo illustrations by David Attie in a coffee table edition, and has been included in anthologies as well, it was first published in the February 1959 issue of the mid-century travel magazine Holiday.

The essay famously opens with the lines "I live in Brooklyn. By choice." Capote goes on to offer a short history of the neighborhood and how he came to live there, and to describe the house he lived in at the time, 70 Willow Street—which is where he wrote what many consider his two greatest works, Breakfast at Tiffany's and In Cold Blood. The essay then gives evocative descriptions of Capote's favorite local haunts—everything from restaurants to antique stores to cat-filled alleyways—as well as various neighborhood characters, before ending with an ominous story about being threatened by a "Cobra," or gang member, near the East River.

John Knowles, an editor at Holiday who later became an acclaimed novelist in his own right, has said that the magazine "asked me to get Truman for them," and claimed that he recruited Capote for Holiday on the very same night that he recruited Jack Kerouac. Knowles described Brooklyn Heights: A Personal Memoir as "in [Capote's] best vein, it was really very special." He also referred to the essay by a different title, "A Neighborhood in Brooklyn."

The house at 70 Willow Street actually belonged to a friend of Capote's, Tony Award-winning theatrical designer Oliver Smith; Capote merely rented some basement rooms in his years there, from 1955 to 1965. But as George Plimpton later noted, "when friends came to call, he often took them on a tour of the entire house (when Smith was not at home) and said it was his house, all his, and that he had restored and decorated every room."

The original essay was illustrated with photographs by David Attie, many of which were taken as Capote showed him around Brooklyn Heights in March, 1958. It was not their first collaboration; Attie had been hired the previous year by famed art director Alexey Brodovitch to produce a big series of photo montages illustrating Breakfast at Tiffany's for what would have been its first publication in Harper's Bazaar. It was the first-ever professional photo assignment for Attie, who had been a student of Brodovitch's. But even though the montages were completed and effectively launched Attie's career—Capote is said to have liked them so much that he agreed to various editorial changes Harper's had demanded—the magazine's publisher decided not to run the novella at all. Its tart language and subject matter were deemed "not suitable," and there was concern that Tiffany's, a major advertiser, would react negatively, so the project was scuttled. By his own account, when Capote resold the novella to Esquire, he specified that he "would not be interested if [Esquire] did not use Attie's [original series of] photographs." He wrote to Esquire fiction editor Rust Hills, "I'm very happy that you are using his pictures, as I think they are excellent." But to Capote's disappointment, Esquire ran just one full-page image of Attie's (though another was used as the cover of at least one paperback edition of the novella).

Curiously, while Attie photographed Capote himself for the essay's appearance in Holiday—both at home on Willow Street and around Brooklyn Heights—none of these portraits were used or seen until decades later. This was presumably because Capote was not yet the literary superstar he would soon become.

"Brooklyn Heights: A Personal Memoir" was first published in book form in 2002 as A House On The Heights (Little Bookroom, 2002). It included a new introduction by Plimpton which explained how the essay first came to be commissioned. It is also included in the anthologies The Brooklyn Reader: Thirty Writers Celebrate America's Favorite Borough (Broadway Books, 1995), and Portraits and Observations: The Essays of Truman Capote (Random House, 2007, and Modern Library Paperbacks, 2008).

In November, 2015, the Little Bookroom issued a new coffee-table edition of the work—a photo book which includes the original essay and Plimpton's 2002 introduction, Attie's previously unpublished portraits of Truman Capote, and his street photography taken in connection with the essay—entitled Brooklyn: A Personal Memoir, with the Lost Photographs of David Attie. The book was well-reviewed in The New York Times and many other publications in America and Europe; The Independent named it one of the eight best art books of 2015 and wrote "when it comes to illustrated works, [this] one relatively slim volume stands out... a real gem of a find.” The book was also a finalist for a 2016 Indie Book Award. Its publication and reception have helped to bring renewed attention to Attie's work.
