= A Tree of Night and Other Stories =

1949 short story collection by Truman Capote

- First edition cover
- Author: Truman Capote
- Language: English
- Genre: Short story collection
- Publisher: Random House
- Publication date: 1949
- Publication place: United States
- Media type: Print (hardback & paperback)
- Pages: 209 pp
- OCLC: 705911

A Tree of Night and Other Stories is a short story collection by the American author Truman Capote published in early 1949. The title story, "A Tree of Night", was first published in Harper’s Bazaar in October 1945.

== Contents ==
The book contains eight short stories:

- "Master Misery"
- "Children on Their Birthdays"
- "Shut a Final Door"
- "Jug of Silver"
- "Miriam"
- "The Headless Hawk"
- "My Side of the Matter"
- "A Tree of Night"

== Themes ==
The horror stories in A Tree of Night and Other Stories involve recurring themes of isolation and emotional anxiety. The protagonists are not quite ready to grow up, whether they are adults or children. The adult characters are emotionally isolated and bear unresolved emotional conflicts from childhood. Overall the stories are noted for involving "sexual anxiety and dysfunction without solidly grounded detail."

== Publication history ==
- In 1950, A Tree of Night and Other Stories was issued in hardback in the United Kingdom by Heinemann
- In 1967, A Tree of Night and Other Stories was reprinted by Penguin in paperback.

== Reception and critical analysis ==
A Tree of Night and Other Stories received mixed reviews upon its publication. It firmly established Capote as a "Southern" writer alongside contemporaries such as William Faulkner or Tennessee Williams. The book received praise for its "enthralling style" and "remarkable beauty of language," but also received criticism for characters who "lack substance."

Helen Garson considers A Tree of Night and Other Stories to have undoubted appeal to readers and ranks it as one of Capote's top four works, alongside Other Voices, Other Rooms, Breakfast at Tiffany's, and In Cold Blood.

Steven L. Vaughn comments that A Tree of Night and Other Stories proves to be consistent with Capote's earlier fiction, most notably Other Voices, Other Rooms, which he describes as dark and dreamlike.

Sales of the book were approximately 6,750.
