= David Attie =

American photographer

David Attie (November 30, 1920 – August 1, 1982) was an American photographer, published in magazines and books from the late 1950s until his death. He was one of the last proteges of photography teacher and art director Alexey Brodovitch. Attie worked in a wide range of styles, illustrating everything from novels to magazine and album covers to subway posters, and taking portraits of Truman Capote, Bobby Fischer, Lorraine Hansberry, and others. He created the first-ever visual depiction of Holly Golightly, the main character in Breakfast at Tiffany's, when he illustrated the Capote novella's first appearance in Esquire Magazine. He was best known in his lifetime for his photo montages—an approach he called "multiple-image photography": pre-Photoshop collages that he made by combining negatives in the darkroom. His work has received new attention with a pair of posthumous books: the 2015 publication of his Capote collaboration Brooklyn: A Personal Memoir, With The Lost Photographs of David Attie, and the 2021 collection of his behind-the-scenes photographs from the first season of Sesame Street, The Unseen Photos of Street Gang. He has been the subject of several solo exhibits, including a two-year retrospective at the Brooklyn Historical Society. One critic wrote that even decades later, "his explorations of photomontage remain durably inspired, innovative, and visually dynamic."

== Early life and education ==
Attie grew up in Bensonhurst, Brooklyn and graduated from Erasmus Hall High School, the same alma mater as Bobby Fischer, whom Attie later photographed. He briefly attended the Kansas City Art Institute and Cooper Union, as well as the Art Students League of New York and the Brodovitch Design Laboratory at The New School.

During his Army service, Attie painted pinup-style portraits on the noses of combat planes; two of these are singled out as "gems" of the "nose-art" genre in Edward Young's book on the subject, B-24 Liberator Units of the CBI. Attie then worked as a commercial illustrator, often under the name Dave Attie; he drew Mad Men-era advertisements as well as the covers of magazines and "pulp" novels, some of which have been reprinted in recent books, until he decided to pursue photography.

== Photographic career ==
Attie began his photographic career as a student and protege of famed Harper's Bazaar art director Alexey Brodovitch, who had similarly mentored the careers of Richard Avedon, Irving Penn, Diane Arbus, and Attie's close friend (and fellow Brodovitch classmate) Hiro. When Attie studied under Brodovitch, his legendary "Design Laboratory" course at The New School For Social Research—which Brodovitch used to discover new talent for Bazaar—was held in Avedon's photo studio.

According to his Capote book, his success in Brodovitch's famously difficult course was the result of a creative accident: "One night, [he] was developing film for his very first class assignment [photos of the original Penn Station], when he realized he’d underexposed every single frame. Class was the next day. In other words, he was toast -- and so was his new career. In a desperate panic, he started layering the negatives together, to create moody, impressionistic photo montages. His life must have been flashing before his eyes, and at the wrong exposure. Brodovitch loved the montages. He spent the entire class gushing over them."

On the final night of the course, Brodovitch gave Attie his first professional assignment, which was to create a series of photo montages to illustrate Truman Capote's newest work, Breakfast at Tiffany's, for its first-ever publication Bazaar in 1958. But while Attie completed the montages, Capote began to clash with the publisher of Bazaar, the Hearst Corporation, over the tart language and subject matter of his novella. Alice Morris, the magazine's literary editor, later recounted that Capote agreed to make the changes Hearst wanted "partly because I showed him the layouts... six pages with beautiful, atmospheric photographs." But in the end, Hearst decided that Bazaar could not run Breakfast at Tiffany's anyway; its language and subject matter were still deemed "not suitable," and there was concern that Tiffany's, a major advertiser, would react negatively.

When Capote resold the novella to Esquire, he specified that he "would not be interested if [Esquire] did not use Attie's [original series of] photographs." He wrote to Esquire fiction editor Rust Hills, "I'm very happy that you are using his pictures, as I think they are excellent." But to Capote's disappointment, Esquire used just one full-page image of Attie's, which was the first-ever visual depiction of Holly Golightly. (Another image of his was later used as the cover of at least one paperback edition of the novella.) Attie's work on the project nonetheless launched his career, gaining him further assignments from both Bazaar and Brodovitch.

In 2021 Esquire re-ran the novella online, reuniting the text with many of Attie's original images.

Attie also went on to shoot portraits of Capote and to illustrate his essay Brooklyn Heights: A Personal Memoir for Holiday Magazine (later republished many times, including in Attie's recent photo book, Brooklyn: A Personal Memoir, Little Bookroom, 2015). Some of Attie's unused Breakfast at Tiffany's montages were later modified and used to illustrate Bill Manville's 1960 memoir Saloon Society, The Diary of a Year Beyond Aspirin, which was also designed by Brodovitch. Brodovitch biographer Kerry William Purcell has described Attie's work on this book as "an inspired set of experimental images."

From that point forward, Attie's commercial work was prolific and wide-ranging – including frequent covers and spreads for Vogue, Time, Newsweek, Playboy, and Bazaar; portraits of everyone from Carl Reiner and Leonard Bernstein to Ralph Ellison and W.E.B. Du Bois and The Band; a variety of album covers (including at least one edition of Sammy Davis Jr. and Carmen McRae performing Porgy and Bess); and his own books of photographs, 1977's Russian Self-Portraits, and 1981's Portrait: Theory (together with Chuck Close, Robert Mapplethorpe and others).

Attie collaborated again with Brodovitch on a still-renowned special section of Harper's than ran in October 1959, "Writing in America," which was edited by future New York Review of Books editor Robert B. Silvers and used Attie's images to illustrate essays by Budd Schulberg, Kingsley Amis, Archibald MacLeish and others; it has been republished in book form, most recently in 2018, and is now seen as a template for The New York Review of Books itself. Attie also did the photos for a 1964 pinup book of Jayne Mansfield called Jayne Mansfield for President, on which he declined to put his name. As part of the promotion for Russian Self-Portraits, Attie appeared on a March, 1978 episode of the game show To Tell The Truth.

Attie's April 1959 photo-shoot of Lorraine Hansberry for Vogue magazine, in the apartment at 337 Bleecker Street apartment where she had written A Raisin in the Sun, has become especially widely published. In her award-winning Hansberry biography Looking for Lorraine: The Radiant and Radical Life of Lorraine Hansberry, Imani Perry writes that in his "gorgeous" images, "Attie captured her intellectual confidence, armor, and remarkable beauty."

When Bobby Fischer arrived for his August 10, 1971 portrait session with Attie—a cover shoot for the March, 1972 issue of Amerika Magazine that was originally assigned to Richard Avedon, whom Fischer rejected because of his work as a fashion photographer—the eccentric chess master believed he looked unshaven and asked Attie to shave him. Attie obliged, and an 8mm home movie of the proceedings, shot by Attie's wife Dotty, was recently found by the family.

In addition to his own work, Attie taught courses at Brodovitch's Design Laboratory in the 1960s, and at both the School of Visual Arts and The New School in the 1970s and '80s. He was also a Specialist-Lecturer at the U.S. Government exhibit "Photography USA" in Bucharest in 1974.

While a number of Attie's portraits are in the Smithsonian's National Portrait Gallery and his work is in the collection of the Museum of Modern Art, for some years after his passing, his work was not widely seen. In the past handful of years, however, Attie's work has experienced a significant revival. In 2014, New York Magazine published some of his previously unseen portraits of Capote from 1958, as well as a 1959 portrait of pioneering Brill Building songwriters Jerry Leiber and Mike Stoller, which was originally shot for Vogue. Then a small selection of his music-related portraits became available through the online gallery Rock Paper Photo. Then a much broader selection of his work became available through Getty Images, leading to its publication in magazines and books around the world.

Attie's work has appeared in a number of recent documentaries as well. His Hansberry portraits appear in Netflix's acclaimed 2015 Nina Simone documentary What Happened, Miss Simone?, in the Oscar-nominated 2016 James Baldwin documentary I Am Not Your Negro, and in director Tracy Strain's 2018 American Masters documentary about Hansberry herself, "Sighted Eyes/Feeling Heart." His Leiber and Stoller portraits appear in HBO's 2018 documentary “Elvis Presley: The Searcher.” His 1969 studio portraits of The Band appear in Daniel Roher's Robbie Robertson documentary Once Were Brothers: Robbie Robertson and The Band, as well as having their own four-page spread in Harvey Kubernik and Ken Kubernik's “The Story of the Band: From Big Pink to The Last Waltz” (Sterling Publishing, 2018).

Most significantly, in November 2015, The Little Bookroom published a coffee-table book of Attie's portraits of Capote and his street photography taken in connection with Brooklyn Heights: A Personal Memoir, entitled Brooklyn: A Personal Memoir, With The Lost Photographs of David Attie. The book was well-reviewed in The New York Times and many other publications in America and around the world; The Independent named it one of the eight best art books of 2015 and wrote "when it comes to illustrated works, [this] one relatively slim volume stands out... a real gem of a find.” The book was also a finalist for a 2016 Indie Book Award. Its publication and reception have helped to bring considerable attention to Attie's work, including prominent supporters such as Bruce Weber and Mary Louise Parker, who called it an "extraordinary book," and is seen leafing through it in the 2018 indie drama Golden Exits.

In December, 2021, Abrams published a book of Attie's behind-the-scenes photos from the very first season of Sesame Street (capturing the making of portions of episodes 96, 106, 110, and 112), entitled "The Unseen Photos of Street Gang: How We Got To Sesame Street." Like Attie's Capote book, this volume was well-reviewed, with one critic writing that "the real star here is Attie's wonderful photography," and praising "the beauty and mystery of the work."

In July 2016, the Brooklyn Historical Society opened a year-and-a-half-long exhibit of Attie's Brooklyn and Capote work, which gained wide press attention. In June 2018, Contact Photo LA opened an exhibit of Attie's long-unseen photo montages. In May 2019, Attie's Russian and American self-portraits were exhibited at the Wednesbury Museum and Art Gallery in the West Midlands of England, as part of the BLAST! Photo Festival, along with work he had influenced by artists from that region. In March 2021, Keith de Lellis Gallery in NYC opened a solo exhibit of Attie's work. Keith De Lellis Gallery continues to represent Attie's work.

Attie was married to acclaimed feminist painter Dotty Attie, and was a cousin of visual artist Shimon Attie.
