= Truman Capote Literary Trust =

American charitable trust

The Truman Capote Literary Trust is an American charitable trust established in 1994 by Truman Capote's literary executor, Alan U. Schwartz, pursuant to Capote's will.

== Origin ==
Truman Capote died in 1984 and his will established a lifetime annuity for his companion, Jack Dunphy. The will stated that, on Dunphy's death, a literary trust be created that would be sustained by the royalties from Capote's books. According to Truman Capote's will the proceeds of the Trust fund a prize for the best book of literary criticism in honor of Newton Arvin, former professor at Smith College, with any other funds to support scholarships for creative writing. Dunphy died in 1992, and the trust was established in 1994.

The trust is located in Los Angeles.

== Awards ==
=== For critics ===
In cooperation with the Iowa Writers Workshop at the University of Iowa, the Trust awards the annual Truman Capote Award for Literary Criticism in Memory of Newton Arvin, commemorating not only Capote but also his friend Newton Arvin, the Smith College professor and critic, distinguished professor of American literature, who lost his job after his homosexuality was exposed. The prize is worth $30,000.

The Trust also established a lifetime achievement award, worth $100,000, and administered through the Stanford University Creative Writing Program. It was awarded to Alfred Kazin (1996) and George Steiner (1998).

=== For students ===
The Trust awards scholarships and fellowships for creative writing at universities such as Cornell University, the University of Iowa Writers' Workshop, the University of Montana, Xavier of Louisiana, the Institute of American Indian Arts, and Brooklyn College, among others.
