= Music for Chameleons =

Book by Truman Capote

- First edition
- Author: Truman Capote
- Language: English
- Genre: Short story collection
- Publisher: Random House
- Publication date: 1980
- Publication place: United States
- Media type: Print (hardback & paperback)
- Pages: 262 pp
- ISBN: 978-0-394-50826-9
- OCLC: 6223424

Music for Chameleons (1980) is a collection of short fiction and non-fiction by the American author Truman Capote. Capote's first collection of new material in fourteen years, Music for Chameleons spent sixteen weeks on the New York Times bestseller list, unprecedented for a collection of short works.

== Structure ==
The book is divided into three sections. Part one, titled "Music for Chameleons", includes the short story after which the section and book are named, as well as five other stories ("Mr. Jones", "A Lamp in a Window", "Mojave", "Hospitality" and "Dazzle").

Part two, the core of the book, consists of a single piece: "Handcarved Coffins", ostensibly a "nonfiction account of an American crime" that suggests certain parallels with his best-known work, the difference being that Capote did not include himself as a character in the narrative when he wrote In Cold Blood.

In the third section, "Conversational Portraits", Capote recalls his encounters with Pearl Bailey, Bobby Beausoleil, Willa Cather, Marilyn Monroe and others. These seven essays are titled "A Day's Work", "Hello, Stranger", "Hidden Gardens", "Derring-Do", "Then It All Came Down", "A Beautiful Child" and "Nocturnal Turnings." "A Day's Work" was Capote's account of a shift he spent with a New York day maid, an idea his friend Slim Keith recalled him having before he set out to work on In Cold Blood.

== Conception ==
In the preface of the collection, Capote claims to have suffered a drug and alcohol-induced nervous breakdown in 1977, at which point he ceased working on his highly anticipated follow-up to In Cold Blood, Answered Prayers, portions of which had elicited a riotous reaction in the jet set when excerpted in Esquire magazine throughout 1975 and 1976. This is most likely the truth, although Capote would often contradict that statement and claim that the publication of the novel was imminent until his death in 1984.

== Publication history ==
In 2001, Music for Chameleons was reprinted in a Penguin Modern Classics edition with a Jamie Keenan cover design and a cover photograph showing Capote dancing with Marilyn Monroe.

== Literary significance and reception ==
Critics have debated the degree to which Capote's nonfiction pieces contain elements of fiction if not downright fabrication, but critics' objections are often qualified by praise for the mood, atmosphere, and range of human emotions Capote captured when creating these character studies. For example, in his review of Music for Chameleons for The New York Times (August 5, 1980), Christopher Lehmann-Haupt wrote:

In short, the pieces in Music for Chameleons have freed him to write about himself—even to confess, without a trace of self-pity or bravado, the agony he felt as a child over his secret desire "to be a girl." Yet these pieces can hardly be called an egotistical celebration of his personality. He does what he does with art. That art is a sort of music. We gather to listen and to blend ourselves into the composer's background. Just like the chameleons.

Much of the book was written during the author's last burst of productivity in 1979. As Capote began to eschew partying and carousing in favor of maintaining a regimented writing schedule at his Turtle Bay residence, his newly disciplined elan gave brief hope to those who felt his addictions were beyond help. Ten of the 14 pieces had been commissioned for Andy Warhol's Interview and initially published in the then-regular "Conversations with Capote" feature. At that point, Warhol was one of Capote's few remaining champions, and Capote's need for support likely necessitated the completion of the work at a rapid clip. Warhol submitted reluctantly to Capote's demand for full creative and editorial control, though editor Brigid Berlin proved adept at winning the author over when changes were absolutely necessary. After the collection's publication, Capote all but terminated his relationship with Interview, and his health and self-restraint continued to deteriorate.

In a 1992 piece in the London Sunday Times, which had earlier serialized Music for Chameleons, reporters Peter and Leni Gillman investigated the source of "Handcarved Coffins", the piece Capote subtitled "a nonfiction account of an American crime". They found no reported series of American murders in the same town which included all of the details Capote described—the sending of miniature coffins, a rattlesnake murder, a decapitation, etc. Instead, they found that a few of the details closely mirrored a case on which Al Dewey, the investigator Capote portrayed in In Cold Blood, had worked. They concluded that Capote had invented the rest of the story, including his meetings with the suspected killer, Quinn.

Capote previously furnished a full account of the Dewey case during a May 20, 1975 appearance on The Tonight Show with Johnny Carson. While noting that he had no desire to write another true crime opus, he recalled that one particular case had caught his interest. Thereafter, Capote went on to describe the rattlesnake murders, the burning farm house murders, and other details. He also stated that he could not divulge all the details of the crime (including the locations involved) because the police did not have enough evidence to arrest their suspect, and that there were others on a "list" that the killer was still stalking. He stated that the police had the suspect under constant surveillance and were awaiting further action. This account seems to follow the portion of the finished story the Gillmans thought was patterned after a true crime but did not include portions that they felt had been fabricated.
