= Miriam (short story) =

1945 short story written by Truman Capote

Miriam: A Classic Story of Loneliness
- First edition in solo book form published by Creative Education, Inc. (1982)
- Author: Truman Capote
- Original title: Miriam
- Illustrator: Sandra Higashi
- Language: English
- Genre: horror fiction
- Publication place: United States
- Pages: 40 pp
- ISBN: 978-0-87191-829-1
- OCLC: 8747954

"Miriam" is a horror fiction short story written by Truman Capote. It was originally published in the June 1945 issue of Mademoiselle. "Miriam" was one of Capote's first published short stories, and in 1946 it earned an O. Henry Award in the category Best First-Published Story.

The story is set in New York City. It starts with the elderly widow Miriam who lives in social isolation in her apartment. While visiting a movie theater, she meets a young girl also named Miriam. The girl asks for the older woman's help in buying a ticket, and the two part ways after the favor is performed.

A week later, the elder Miriam is visited at home by the girl. The girl demands a meal, and asks for a gift. The elder woman reluctantly obeys. When the girl demands a goodnight kiss, the woman refuses and the girl leaves. The following day, the girl enters the home without having permission to do so. The girl announces that she is moving into the apartment. The woman asks a neighbor for help, but the man sees no girl. At the end of the story, the woman and the mysterious girl are staring at each other. One of them offers a greeting, but it is left unclear which one.

== Conception ==
Carson McCullers' sister, Rita Smith, who worked as an editor's assistant at Madmoiselle recommended Capote's story "Miriam." She assisted George Davis, who gave Truman his first start in being published.

== Plot summary ==
"Miriam" is about a 61-year-old widow named Mrs. H. T. Miller who wants to spend the remaining years of her life alone in her apartment near the East River after the death of her husband, H. T. Miller. She is very lonely, has no friends to speak of and does not keep in touch with any of her relatives.

One day, going into a movie theater, she meets a young, intelligent girl named Miriam. Mrs. Miller is intrigued that the girl's first name is also Miriam. Miriam asks Mrs. Miller to buy her a movie ticket because the usher will not let her in. She gives Mrs. Miller 25 cents (two dimes and a nickel) to buy her a ticket. They part as Mrs. Miller goes in search of a seat. When the movie ends, Mrs. Miller returns home. The following week, there is a knock on Mrs. Miller's door. When she answers it, she finds out it is Miriam, the girl she met at the movie theater. Mrs. Miller asks Miriam to go home, but Miriam refuses and asks Mrs. Miller to make her a jelly sandwich. After Miriam agrees to leave if given the sandwich, she goes into Mrs. Miller's bedroom and finds a cameo brooch that was given to Mrs. Miller by her deceased husband. She asks Mrs. Miller if she can keep it, and Mrs. Miller, despite her desire to stop her from taking it, relents in helplessness. Miriam then goes back to the couch and finishes her sandwich.

Before leaving, Miriam asks Mrs. Miller for a kiss goodnight, but Mrs. Miller refuses. Miriam walks over to a nearby vase and smashes it on the floor, tramples the bouquet, then leaves. The next morning, Mrs. Miller leaves her apartment to spend the day shopping at various stores around New York City. Upon arriving home, Miriam returns, insistently ringing the doorbell while Mrs. Miller refuses to open the door. After the doorbell ringing ends, Mrs. Miller goes to her door to see if Miriam has left. Miriam has not, and rushes inside the house before Mrs. Miller can close the door. Miriam perches upon the couch and tells Mrs. Miller to bring in the large box she brought with her. Out of curiosity, she does. While commenting on the cherries, almond cakes, and white flowers that Mrs. Miller bought while she was shopping, Miriam tells Mrs. Miller to open the box. All she finds are clothes and a second doll similar to the one Miriam was holding. Miriam then tells Mrs. Miller that she is going to live with her.

A frightened Mrs. Miller goes to the apartment downstairs where a young couple lives. Mrs. Miller tells them that a young girl keeps on appearing and will not leave her alone. She convinces the man living there to check upstairs while his wife comforts Mrs. Miller. The man returns downstairs and says that there is no girl upstairs. Mrs. Miller asks if there was a large box, and the man says that there wasn't. Mrs. Miller goes back upstairs to find no one is there. Scared more than ever at the startling emptiness of the house, she slumps onto the couch, drained. She closes her eyes and calms down, reminding herself that she is Mrs. H. T. Miller, the woman who lives alone and does everything for herself. She then becomes aware of another sound, the sound of a silk dress ruffling. She stiffens and fearfully opens her eyes to see Miriam staring at her. The last line of the story " 'Hello,' said Miriam" is ambiguous, in that it is unclear which Miriam is speaking.

== Publication history ==
"Miriam" was reprinted as early as 1949 in Capote's short story collection A Tree of Night and Other Stories. It was published in independent hardback form in September 1981, under the title Miriam: A Classic Story of Loneliness. Most recently it was included in The Complete Stories of Truman Capote, published in 2004.

== Reception and critical analysis ==
"Miriam" is noted for having a "dreamlike, psychological quality" and a theme exploring double personality disorder.

Reynolds Price observes that two of Capote's early short stories, "Miriam," along with "A Jug of Silver" reflect his familiarity with fellow contemporary southern writing, specifically that of Carson McCullers. He also notes "Miriam" is imbued with a "perhaps too-easy eeriness.".

Readers have noted symbolism in the story, in particular the use of colors in clothing. Blue, Mrs. Miller’s favorite color, is seen as a symbol of sadness. Plum is viewed as a symbol of wealth and white a symbol for being clean, good, and healthful. Notably Miriam often wears white, and many times during the story it is snowing, and snow is also white. The Hebrew origin of the name "Miriam" may translate as "wished-for child," which could explain a great deal about what Mrs. Miller wants and sees in her young visitor. Miriam may be viewed as a symbol for Azrael, the angel of death.

Capote also comments on the themes of identity that lie within the story:"... For the only thing she had lost to Miriam was her identity, but now she knew she had found again the person who lived in this room, who cooked her own meals, who owned a canary, who was someone she could trust and believe in: Mrs. H. T. Miller” (Capote, 49)

== Adaptation ==
Adaptations of "Miriam" are incorporated into Frank Perry's 1969 anthology film Trilogy (aka Truman Capote's Trilogy), which also includes adaptations of "A Christmas Memory" and "Among the Paths to Eden."
