= Summer Crossing =

Novel by Truman Capote

- First edition
- Author: Truman Capote
- Language: English
- Publisher: Random House
- Publication date: 2005
- Publication place: United States
- Media type: Print (hardback & paperback) & e-book, audio-CD
- Pages: 142
- ISBN: 1-4000-6522-4
- OCLC: 441129903

Summer Crossing is the second novel written by American author Truman Capote. He started the novel in about 1943 and worked on it intermittently for several years before putting it aside. Capote's manuscript came to light almost 20 years after Capote's death, and the novel was published in 2005.

The novel tells the story of an independent-minded young socialite whose romantic dalliances grow increasingly serious when her parents leave her alone in New York City for the summer while they travel to Europe.

== Conception and critical reception ==
Capote started writing Summer Crossing in 1943 when he was working for The New Yorker. After taking an evening walk in Monroeville, Alabama, and being inspired to write his first published novel, Other Voices, Other Rooms, he set aside the manuscript. On August 30, 1949, while vacationing in North Africa, Capote informed his publisher that he was approximately two-thirds through his first draft of Summer Crossing. He optimistically spoke of finalizing the manuscript by the end of the year, even making a vow that he would not return to the United States until he did, but he never submitted more than a first draft to his publisher. Capote had been making minor edits to the work over a period of approximately 10 years. Robert Linscott, Capote's senior editor at Random House, was unimpressed with the first draft. He said he thought it was a good novel, but that it didn't showcase Capote's "distinctive artistic voice". After reading the draft several times, Capote noted that the novel was "well written and it's got a lot of style", but that he just did not like it. In particular Capote began "to fear [the novel] was thin, clever, unfelt". Later Capote claimed to have destroyed the unpolished manuscript, along with several other notebooks of prose, in a fit of harsh self-criticism.

== Manuscript recovery ==
When Capote left a basement apartment he had been renting in Brooklyn Heights around 1950, he instructed his landlord to trash anything he had left. The next occupant of the apartment, described as a "house sitter", nevertheless rescued materials that appeared valuable and held them until his death fifty years later. His nephew and heir came into possession of these materials and identified and arranged with Sotheby's to auction these materials in 2004. Included were manuscripts of works both published and unpublished, drafts, notes, photographs, and correspondence. The collection received no bids at auction because of the high reserve price that was set and because those responsible for Capote's estate had, with Sotheby's assistance, asserted their claim that ownership of the physical papers did not confer publication rights, which were held by the Truman Capote Literary Trust.

The New York Public Library reached an agreement to buy the papers and archived them in its permanent Truman Capote Collection. Capote's lawyer, Alan U. Schwartz, as trustee for the charitable trust established by Capote's will, made the decision to publish Summer Crossing after consultations to assess its quality and significance. He concluded: "While not a polished work, it fully reflects the emergence of an original voice and a surprisingly proficient writer of prose." The novel appeared in 2005. The first edition was set from Capote's original manuscript, which was written in four school notebooks accompanied by 62 supplemental notes.

An excerpt from the story was also published in the October 24, 2005, issue of The New Yorker.

== Plot summary ==
The story takes place in New York City over the course of the hot summer of 1945.

Grady McNeil, a 17-year-old upper class Protestant débutante, steadfastly refuses to accompany her parents on their usual summer ritual of travel, in this case to France. Left in the city for the summer by herself, she pursues a covert romance with Clyde Manzer, a Jewish parking lot attendant, whom she had noticed several months earlier. Grady spends time with Clyde and meets some of his friends, and in turn the couple visits the Central Park Zoo together. There, Clyde mentions his brother's bar mitzvah as a way of introducing the fact that he is Jewish.

As the summer heats up, so does Grady's and Clyde's romance. The couple is soon wed in Red Bank, New Jersey. Once married, Grady meets Clyde's middle-class family in Brooklyn, and only then is the couple truly faced with the stark reality of the cultural divide between her family and his. Grady then realizes at her sister Apple's home that she is six weeks pregnant.

Grady has passed over a couple of opportunities to spend time with the handsome young Peter Bell, a man of her social stature who is romantically interested in her. Eventually Grady's sister, Apple, confronts her about her relationship with Clyde. In an abrupt ending, an inebriated Grady aims her speeding Buick with passengers Peter, Clyde, and Clyde's friend Gump so it will crash off the Queensboro Bridge, killing everyone.

== Film adaptation ==
Plans for a film adaptation of Summer Crossing were announced 2013. Playwright Tristine Skyler was working with Scarlett Johansson on the screenplay and Johansson was slated to direct in her feature film directorial debut. She said: "Being able to bring this story to the screen as my full-length directorial debut is a life dream and deep privilege."
