= Local Color (book) =

1950 book by Truman Capote

- First edition cover
- Author: Truman Capote
- Language: English
- Genre: Travel literature
- Publisher: Random House
- Publication date: 1950
- Publication place: United States
- Media type: Print (Hardback & Paperback)
- Pages: 92 pp
- OCLC: 1465967

Local Color is the third published book by the American author Truman Capote, released in the Fall of 1950. Local Color includes notes and sketches about persons and places, including travel journal-style essays on cities and countries Capote had lived in or visited.

Local Color was published while Capote was vacationing in Venice.

== Conception ==
Because Capote was in the habit of working with a number of fashionable magazines he was very keen to take a personal part in the layout and formatting of the physical book, including color schemes and photographic layouts.

== Contents ==
The book includes nine vignettes:

- "New Orleans"
- "New York City"
- "Brooklyn"
- "Hollywood"
- "Haiti"
- "To Europe"
- "Ischia"
- "Tangier"
- "A Ride Through Spain"

== Reception and critical analysis ==
Local Color received mixed reviews upon its publication. It received a brief unfavorable review from the Los Angeles Times. The Boston Sunday Herald gave Capote's writing an unfavorable review, but praised some of the work's photography. The Providence Sunday Journal offered a positive review of Capote's writing style, stating:

"very good since it is characterized by varied, lively writing, immediate and honest; it is selective, rather romantically coloured, and there is not too much self-intrusion from the author."

Sales of Local Color reached approximately 4,500 books total.
