= The Muses Are Heard =

1956 book by Truman Capote

- First UK edition
- Author: Truman Capote
- Language: English
- Genre: Travel literature
- Publisher: Random House (US); Heinemann (UK)
- Publication date: 1956
- Publication place: United States
- Media type: Print
- Pages: 182 pp
- OCLC: 27306458

The Muses Are Heard is an early journalistic work of Truman Capote. Originally published in The New Yorker (October 20 and 27, 1956), it is a narrative account of the cultural mission by The Everyman's Opera to the U.S.S.R. in the mid-1950s.

Capote was sent to accompany the Opera as it staged a production of Porgy and Bess. First published in two parts, it was later released as a short non-fiction book. The book's title comes from a speech given by one of the Soviet cultural ministry staff, who declared, “When the cannons are heard, the muses are silent. When the cannons are silent, the muses are heard.”

== Narrative ==
The book opens with the cast, directors, support personnel and Mrs. Ira Gershwin waiting in West Berlin for their visas to be returned by the Soviet Embassy. They are briefed by U.S. Embassy staff, and among other questions, ask if they will be under surveillance, presumably by the KGB, during their visit. They also consider political issues and how to answer sensitive questions, especially those about the “Negro situation” – also whether it is safe to drink the water: the company includes several children. Capote, who is present in the narrative, returns to his hotel room to find a brown paper parcel of anti-Communist pamphlets.

After a train ride of several days (the first two without a dining car), the cast and crew arrive in Leningrad a few days before Christmas and are dispatched to a hotel, the Astoria, which boasts, as Capote writes, “a trio of restaurants, each leading into the other, cavernous affairs cheerful as airplane hangars.” The guest rooms are small, over-heated, and over-furnished with “a miasma of romantic marble statuary.” Capote claims that these rooms have been assigned according to each cast member's payroll status. According to Bolshevik logic, claims Capote, the less you make, the better the accommodations.

Predictably, the production of Porgy and Bess runs into a few snags. Programs are not printed in time for Opening Night. After the show, the directors cannot quite determine the Russian audience's response, beyond their appreciation for certain musical numbers and their disapproval of the opera's sexual themes.

== Literary significance and reception ==
Capote's biographer Gerald Clarke states that The Muses Are Heard was considered 'mischievous' when it appeared in print; for example, Capote puts into the mouth of another person (American reporter Priscilla Johnson) his own opinion of the troupe ('They're such a second-rate company'); his cameos of some of the cast, the entourage, and the Russian Ministry Staff verge on the grotesque. Clarke also reveals that several of the incidents in the story, including the encounter with the Norwegian businessmen, were entirely invented by Capote. This may have been a narrative device used by Capote to intrude his own opinions. John Steinbeck states that he used this 'third party' method in the journalism collected in his Once There Was a War.
