= Other Voices, Other Rooms (novel) =

Novel by Truman Capote

- First edition hardback
- Author: Truman Capote
- Language: English
- Genre: Southern Gothic; Bildungsroman; Gay novel
- Publisher: Random House
- Publication date: January 1948
- Publication place: United States
- Media type: Print (hardback)
- Pages: 231 pp
- OCLC: 3737623

Other Voices, Other Rooms is a 1948 novel by Truman Capote. It is written in the Southern Gothic style and is notable for its atmosphere of isolation and decadence.

Other Voices, Other Rooms is significant because it is both Capote's first published novel and semi-autobiographical. It is also noteworthy due to its erotically charged photograph of the author, risqué content, and debut at number nine on The New York Times Best Seller list, remaining on the list for nine weeks.

== Conception ==
Truman Capote spent two years writing Other Voices, Other Rooms. He began the manuscript after an inspiring walk in the woods while he was living in Monroeville, Alabama. He immediately cast aside his rough manuscript for Summer Crossing and took up the new idea. He left Alabama and continued work in New Orleans. His budding literary fame put him in touch with fellow southerner and writer Carson McCullers. Capote joined McCullers at the artists' community, Yaddo, in Saratoga Springs, New York, and McCullers helped Capote locate an agent (Marion Ives) and a publisher (Random House) for his project. Capote continued work in North Carolina, and eventually completed the novel in a rented cottage in Nantucket, Massachusetts.

== Plot ==
After his mother's death, 13-year-old Joel Harrison Knox, a lonely, effeminate boy, is sent from New Orleans to live with his father, who abandoned him at birth. Arriving at Skully's Landing, a vast, decaying mansion on an isolated plantation in Mississippi, Joel meets his sullen stepmother Amy; her cousin Randolph, a gay man and dandy; the defiant tomboy Idabel, a girl who becomes his friend; and Jesus and Zoo, the two black caretakers of the home. He also sees a spectral "queer lady" with "fat dribbling curls" watching him from a top window.

Despite Joel's queries, the whereabouts of his father remains a mystery. When he finally is allowed to see his father, Joel is stunned to find he is a mute quadriplegic, having tumbled down a flight of stairs after being accidentally shot by Randolph and nearly dying. Joel runs away with Idabel to a carnival and meets a woman with dwarfism; on a Ferris wheel, Joel rebuffs her when she attempts to touch Joel in a sexual manner. Looking for Idabel in a storm, Joel catches pneumonia and eventually returns to the Landing, where he is nursed back to health by Randolph. The implication in the final paragraph is that the "queer lady" beckoning from the window had actually been Randolph, dressed in an old Mardi Gras costume.

== Characters ==
Joel Harrison Knox: The 13-year-old protagonist of the story. Joel is a portrait of Truman Capote in his own youth, notably being delicate, fair-skinned and a natural teller of outrageous tales.

Mr. Edward R. Sansom: Joel's paralyzed father, a former boxing manager.

Miss Amy Skully: Joel's sharp-tongued stepmother, in her late forties and shorter than Joel. Miss Amy's character is reminiscent of Callie Faulk, an older cousin with whom Truman Capote lived in Alabama. She is also reminiscent of Capote's maternal grandmother, Mabel Knox, who always wore a glove on her left hand to cover an unknown malady and was known for her Southern aristocratic ways.

Randolph: Miss Amy's first cousin and owner of Skully's Landing. Randolph is in his mid-30s and is effeminate, narcissistic, and openly homosexual. Randolph's character is largely imaginary, but is a faint shadow of Capote's older cousin Bud Faulk, a single man, likely homosexual, and role model for Capote while he was growing up in Alabama.

Idabel Thompkins: A gloomy, cantankerous tomboy who befriends Joel. Idabel's character is an exaggeration of Capote's childhood friend, Nelle Harper Lee, later the author of To Kill a Mockingbird.

Florabel Thompkins: Idabel's feminine and prissy sister.

Jesus Fever: A centenarian, pygmyish, African American mule-driver at Skully's Landing, where he had been enslaved 70 years before.

Missouri Fever (Zoo): Jesus' granddaughter who is in her mid-20s. She wears a scarf on her elongated neck to hide a large scar inflicted by Keg Brown, who was sentenced to a chain gang for his crime. Missouri Fever's character is based on a cook named Little Bit who lived and worked in the Alabama home where Capote lived, as a child, with his older cousins.

Pepe Alvarez: A Latin professional boxer who is Randolph's original obsession and muse, and the prototype that led to Randolph's obsession with young Joel, as it is implied that Joel resembles Pepe.

Ellen Kendall: Joel's kind, genteel aunt who sends him from New Orleans to live with his father.

Little Sunshine: A short, bald, ugly, African American hermit who lives at The Cloud Hotel.

Miss Wisteria: A blond midget who befriends Joel and Idabel at a fair traveling through Noon City.

== Major themes ==
On more than one occasion Capote himself asserts that the central theme of Other Voices, Other Rooms is a son's search for his father. In Capote's own words, his father Arch Persons was "a father who, in the deepest sense, was nonexistent." Also: "the central theme of Other Voices, Other Rooms was my search for the existence of this essentially imaginary person."

Another theme is self-acceptance as part of coming of age. Deborah Davis points out that Joel's thorny and psychological voyage while living with eccentric Southern relatives involves maturing "from an uncertain boy into a young man with a strong sense of self and acceptance of his homosexuality." Gerald Clarke describes the conclusion of the novel, "Finally, when he goes to join the queer lady in the window, Joel accepts his destiny, which is to be homosexual, to always hear other voices and live in other rooms. Yet acceptance is not a surrender; it is a liberation. "I am me," he whoops. "I am Joel, we are the same people." So, in a sense, had Truman rejoiced when he made peace with his own identity."

In addition to the two specific themes above, John Berendt notes in his introduction to the 2004 Modern Library edition, several broad themes including the terror of abandonment, the misery of loneliness and the yearning to be loved.

Another theme is understanding others. John Knowles says, "The theme in all of his [Truman Capote's] books is that there are special, strange gifted people in the world and they have to be treated with understanding."

Gerald Clarke points out that within the story Randolph is the spokesperson for the novel's major themes. Clarke asserts that the four major themes of Other Voices, Other Rooms are "the loneliness that afflicts all but the stupid or insensitive; the sacredness of love, whatever its form; the disappointment that invariably follows high expectations; and the perversion of innocence."

== Publication history ==
Other Voices, Other Rooms was published in 1979 as part of the 60 Signed Limited Editions (1977–1982) series by the Franklin Library, described as a "distributor of great 'classic title' books produced in fine bindings for collectors".

It was published by Random House in January 1948.

== Reception and critical analysis ==
The novel's reception began even before it hit bookshelves. Prior to its publication, 20th Century Fox optioned movie rights to the novel without having seen the work. In an article about young American writers, Life magazine conferred Capote equal space alongside celebrities such as Gore Vidal and Jean Stafford, even though he had never published a novel.

Literary critics of the day were eager to review Capote's novel. Mostly positive reviews came from a variety of publications including The New York Herald Tribune, but The New York Times published a dismissive review. Diana Trilling wrote in The Nation about Capote's "striking literary virtuosity" and praised "his ability to bend language to his poetic moods, his ear for dialect and varied rhythms of speech." Capote was compared to William Faulkner, Eudora Welty, Carson McCullers, Katherine Anne Porter, and even Oscar Wilde and Edgar Allan Poe. Authors as well as critics weighed in; Somerset Maugham remarked that Capote was "the hope of modern literature."

After Capote pressured the editor George Davis for his assessment of the novel, he quipped, "I suppose someone had to write the fairy Huckleberry Finn." Some twenty-five years later, Ian Young points out that Other Voices, Other Rooms notably avoided the period convention of an obligatory tragedy, typically involving suicide, murder, madness, despair or accidental death for the gay protagonist. Other Voices, Other Rooms is ranked number 26 on a list of the top 100 gay and lesbian novels compiled by The Publishing Triangle in 1999. More than fifty years after its publication, Anthony Slide notes that Other Voices, Other Rooms is one of only four familiar gay novels of the first half of the 20th century. The other three novels are Djuna Barnes' Nightwood, Carson McCullers' Reflections in a Golden Eye, and Gore Vidal's The City and the Pillar.

When Other Voices, Other Rooms was published in 1948, it stayed on The New York Times Bestseller list for nine weeks, selling more than 26,000 copies.

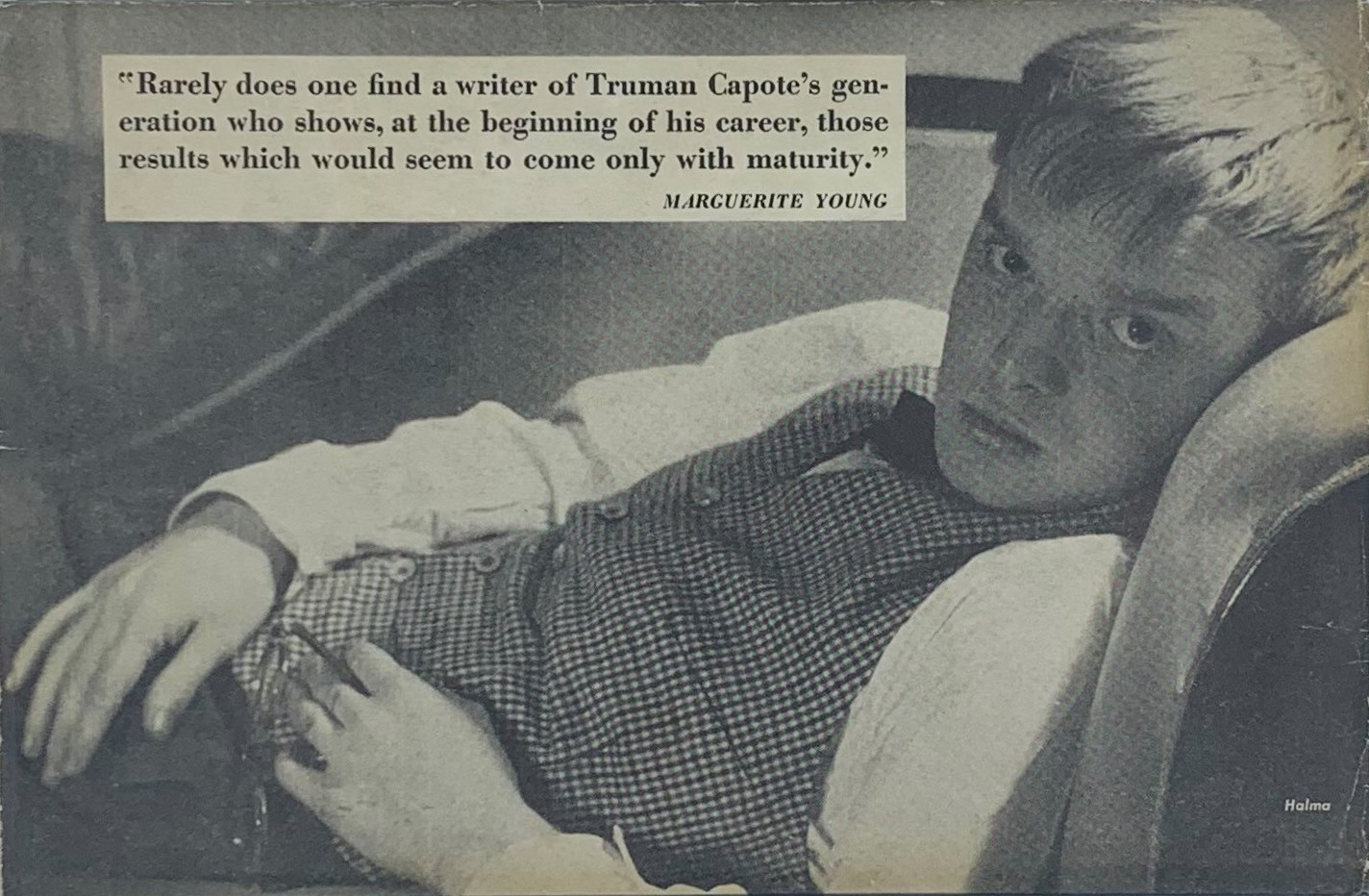
Harold Halma's photograph of Capote on the back cover of the book.

The promotion and controversy surrounding this novel catapulted Capote to fame. A 1947 Harold Halma photograph, used to promote the book, showed the then-23-year-old Capote reclining and gazing into the camera. Gerald Clarke, a modern biographer, observed, "The famous photograph: Harold Halma's picture on the dustjacket of Other Voices, Other Rooms caused as much comment and controversy as the prose inside. Truman claimed that the camera had caught him off guard, but in fact he had posed himself and was responsible for both the picture and the publicity." Much of the early attention to Capote centered around different interpretations of this photograph, which was viewed as a suggestive pose by some. According to Clarke, the photo created an "uproar" and gave Capote "not only the literary, but also the public personality he had always wanted."

In an article titled A Voice from a Cloud in the November 1967 edition of Harper's Magazine, Capote acknowledged the autobiographical nature of Other Voices, Other Rooms. He wrote "Other Voices, Other Rooms was an attempt to exorcise demons, an unconscious, altogether intuitive attempt, for I was not aware, except for a few incidents and descriptions, of its being in any serious degree autobiographical. Rereading it now, I find such self-deception unpardonable." In the same essay Capote describes how a visit to his childhood home brought back memories that catalyzed his writing. Describing this visit Capote writes, "It was while exploring under the mill that I'd been bitten in the knee by a cottonmouth moccasin—precisely as happens to Joel Knox." Capote uses childhood friends, acquaintances, places, and events as counterparts and prototypes for writing the symbolic tale of his own Alabama childhood.

== Adaptations ==
On October 19, 1995, Artistic License Films screened a film version of Other Voices, Other Rooms directed by David Rocksavage at the Hamptons International Film Festival. The movie starred David Speck as Joel Harrison Knox, Anna Thomson as Miss Amy Skully, and Lothaire Bluteau as Randolph. The movie had its official US release on December 5, 1997.
