= Jack Dunphy =

American novelist and playwright (1914–1992)

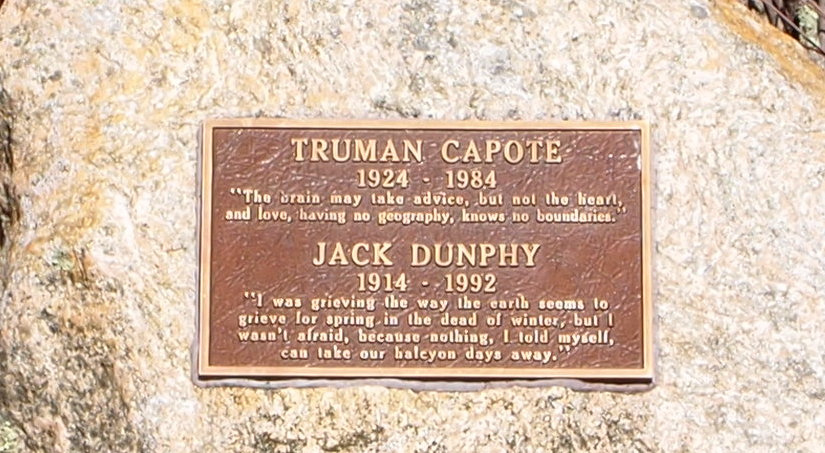
- Truman Capote and Jack Dunphy stone at Crooked Pond in the Long Pond Greenbelt in Southampton, New York
- Born: John Paul Dunphy; August 22, 1914; Atlantic City, New Jersey, U.S.
- Died: April 26, 1992 (aged 77); New York City, U.S.
- Occupations: Novelist, playwright
- Spouse: Joan McCracken (m. 1939; div. 1948)
- Partner: Truman Capote (1948–1975)

John Paul Dunphy (August 22, 1914 – April 26, 1992) was an American novelist and playwright. He was widely known as the partner of author Truman Capote.

== Life and career ==
Dunphy was born in Atlantic City, New Jersey, and was raised in a working-class neighborhood of Philadelphia, Pennsylvania. His sister was Gloria Dunphy. He trained in ballet under Catherine Littlefield, danced at the 1939 New York World's Fair, and toured with the George Balanchine company in South America in 1941.

He married Joan McCracken, another Philadelphia dancer. They later appeared in the original Broadway production of Oklahoma! in 1943, in which McCracken played Sylvie and Dunphy danced as one of the cowboys. Dunphy also danced in The Prodigal Son, a ballet performed on Broadway in conjunction with The Pirates of Penzance in 1942.

Dunphy enlisted in the U.S. Army in January 1944 during World War II. During his service, he published his first work, "The Life of a Carrot," in Short Story magazine.

=== Relationship with Truman Capote ===
When he met writer Truman Capote in 1948, Dunphy had just published John Fury, a critically acclaimed novel, and was recovering after a recent divorce from McCracken. Ten years older than Capote, Dunphy was in many ways Capote's opposite, favoring solitude while Capote was exuberantly social.

In 1950, the two writers settled in Taormina, Sicily, in a house where the writer D. H. Lawrence had once lived. Capote dedicated his short story "One Christmas" to Jack's sister, Gloria Dunphy. The couple drifted more and more apart in the later years and their relationship turned platonic after Truman's story "La Côte Basque, 1965" was published in Esquire magazine in 1975. They remained close friends and when Capote died in 1984, his will named Dunphy as the chief beneficiary.

In 1987, Dunphy published a memoir, titled Dear Genius: My Life with Truman Capote, which details their relationship. He wrote: "Truman and I were never together-together people as most couples are. Such proximity would have killed us. We were always dreaming away from wherever we were, thus repeating the pattern that had commenced in childhood, when one's need to escape from one's own kind was so savage, so burning in its intensity, that had either of us stayed home, he would certainly have perished."

=== Death ===
In 1992, Dunphy died of cancer in New York at age 77. Dunphy and Capote had separate houses in Sagaponack, New York. Following their deaths, some of the money from their estates was donated to The Nature Conservancy, which used it to acquire nearby Crooked Pond on the Long Island Greenbelt between Sag Harbor, New York and Bridgehampton, New York, and their mingled ashes were scattered by the pond where a marker commemorates them. Joanne Carson, the second wife of Johnny Carson, maintained that she also had some of Capote's ashes (a claim Dunphy denied), which she had kept at her home in Bel Air, where Capote died. After those ashes were stolen and then returned, she bought a crypt for them at Westwood Village Memorial Park Cemetery in Westwood, Los Angeles, California, although it is unclear whether the ashes were ever deposited there. Carson died in 2015.

== Portrayals ==
Dunphy is portrayed by Bruce Greenwood in the 2005 film Capote and by John Benjamin Hickey in the 2006 film Infamous. He is portrayed by Joe Mantello in the FX television series Feud: Capote vs. The Swans.

== Books ==
John Fury (Harper and Brothers, 1946) is the story of an Irish working-class man who moves from a happy marriage to an unpleasant one in a life of poverty, hard work, and frustration, where his only reprisal is anger. According to the website of Ayer Company Publishers, a reprint publisher of rare and hard to find titles, Mary McGrory praised the book in The New York Times at the time of publication:

It adds up to a remarkable first novel, warm and strong, its unflinching realism saved from brutality by the author's compassion and restraint ... What Betty Smith did tenderly for Brooklyn, James T. Farrell harshly for Chicago and, most recently, Edward McSorley in his moving Our Own Kind for Providence, Dunphy does for Philadelphia.

Calmann-Lévy published a French translation in 1949, which is available at the Library of Congress. Arno Press reprinted the English version in 1976.

Other Dunphy novels are Friends and Vague Lovers (Farrar, Straus and Young, 1952), Nightmovers (William Morrow, 1967), An Honest Woman (Random House, 1971), First Wine (Louisiana State University Press, 1982) and its sequel, The Murderous McLaughlins, (McGraw-Hill, 1988). In this book, set again in Philadelphia, c. 1917, the same narrator, at age eight, tries to get his errant father Jim to return home to his family.

Dunphy also wrote Dear Genius: A Memoir of My Life with Truman Capote, published by McGraw-Hill in 1987. According to the review at Amazon.com, the book is actually a novel, with the subtitle provided by the publisher; Dunphy had subtitled the manuscript more accurately A Tribute to Truman Capote.

== Plays ==
Dunphy's plays include:

- Light a Penny Candle
- Saturday Night Kid, a play for two men and one woman, which opened at the Provincetown Playhouse on May 15, 1958, for a 10-day run.
- The Gay Apprentice, a play for four men and five women.
- Café Moon, a one-act fantasy for seven men and two women about an aging and disillusioned clerk who drinks his nights away.
- Too Close for Comfort, a full-length comedy/drama for three men and one woman about a suicide-prone young man. It played for one performance at the Lucille Lortel Theatre (then known as the Theatre de Lys) on Christopher Street in New York on February 19, 1960, in a double-bill as part of the American National Theater and Academy (ANTA) Matinee Series, along with Dunphy's The Gay Apprentice.
- Squirrel, a one-act sketch for two men and one woman about a shy office clerk who likes squirrels so much he almost believes he is one. It played at the same theater as part of the ANTA series on April 10, 1962.
