= Observations (Avedon book) =

1959 coffee table book

- First edition slipcase
- Author: Richard Avedon & Truman Capote
- Language: English
- Genre: Photography
- Publisher: Simon & Schuster
- Publication date: 1959
- Publication place: United States
- Media type: Print Hardback
- Pages: 151 pp
- OCLC: 1455816

Observations is a collaborative coffee table book with photography by Richard Avedon, commentary by Truman Capote and design by Alexey Brodovitch. It features a slipcase with color, all-capitalized lettering; the book itself is further housed in a clear acetate/glassine slip cover and is printed with the same bold design as the slipcase in black-and-white. Simon & Schuster published the work in 1959 having it printed using the photogravure method in Lucerne, Switzerland.

== Conception ==
Avedon and Capote started collaboration on the book in 1945.

== Contents ==
Observations contains numerous portraits of famous people of the twentieth century, including Pablo Picasso, J. Robert Oppenheimer, Katharine Hepburn, Marilyn Monroe and Mae West.

== Reception ==
Isak Dinesen was initially insulted by Capote's description of her, but forgave him shortly before her death in 1962.

Kerry William Purcell contends the book's design represents the pinnacle of Alexey Brodovitch's book designs.

As one of the first coffee table books with popular appeal, the book is a sought-after collector's item and typically sells for hundreds of dollars, even when not in ideal condition. Facsimiles of the book's pages are included in Avedon's later book Evidence.
