= Joanne Carson (model) =

American model; wife of Johnny Carson (1931–2015)

- Born: Joanne Bee Copeland; October 20, 1931; Los Angeles, California, U.S.
- Died: May 8, 2015 (aged 83); Los Angeles, California, U.S.
- Occupations: Model; flight attendant; television host
- Spouses: Johnny Carson (m. 1963; div. 1972); Richard Rever (divorced)

Joanne Carson (née Copeland; October 20, 1931 – May 8, 2015) was an American model, flight attendant, and television host. She was married to Johnny Carson from 1963 to 1972.

She was the co-host of the game show Video Village and later hosted the syndicated talk show Joanne Carson's VIPs.

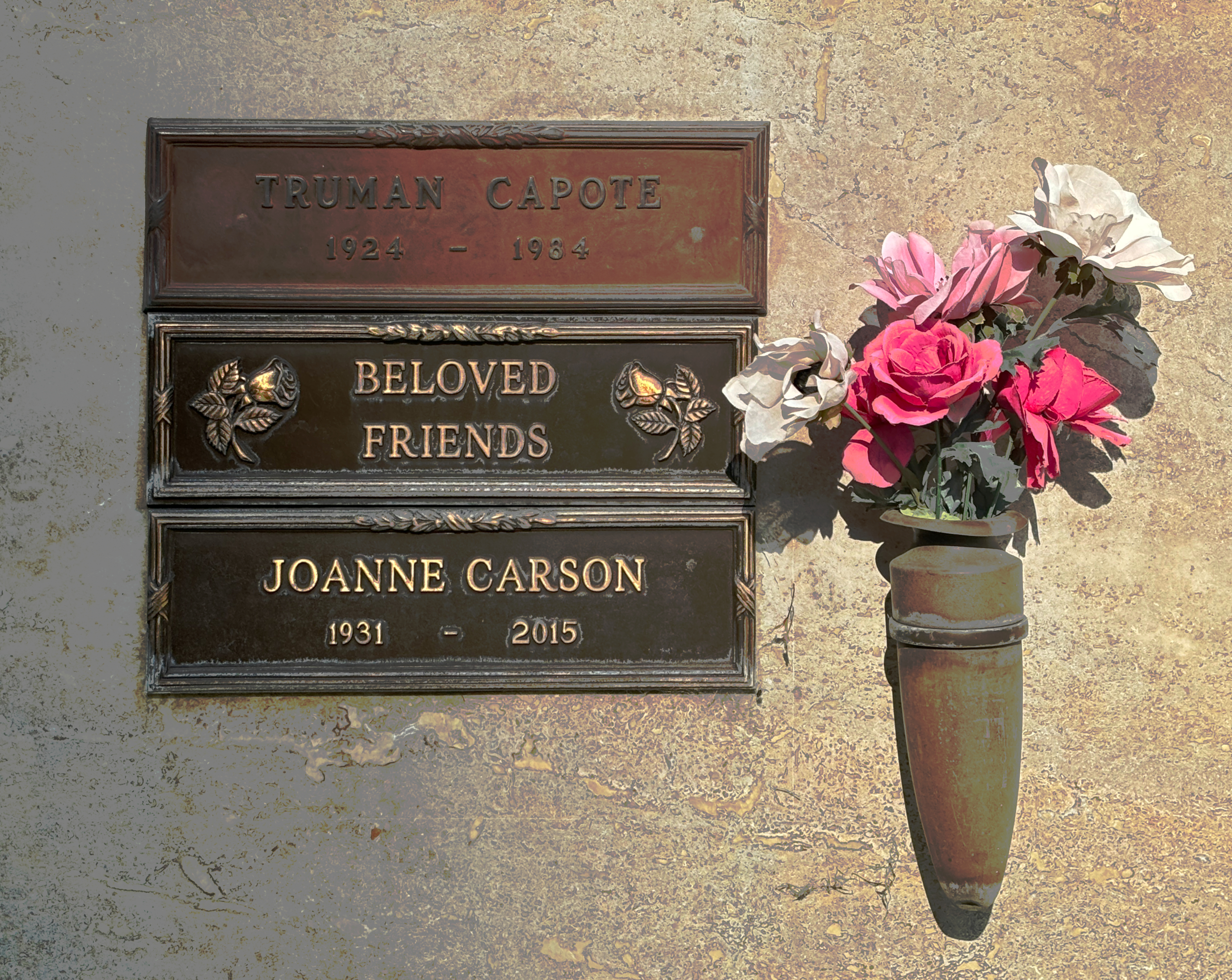
Joanne Carson crypt with Truman Capote

Joanne Carson became close friends with Truman Capote, who died at her Los Angeles home in 1984.

== In popular culture ==
Molly Ringwald portrayed Carson in the 2024 series Feud: Capote vs. The Swans.
