= Haywire (1980 film) =

1980 film by Michael Tuchner

Haywire is a 1980 American television film, directed by Michael Tuchner, and starring Lee Remick. The film score was composed by Billy Goldenberg. The film was based on the memoir by Brooke Hayward, who is portrayed in the film by Deborah Raffin.

== Cast ==
- Lee Remick as Margaret Sullavan
- Jason Robards Jr. as Leland Hayward
- Deborah Raffin as Brooke Hayward
- Dianne Hull as Bridget Hayward
- Hart Bochner as Bill Hayward
- Linda Gray as Nan
- Richard Johnson as Kenneth Wagg
- Dean Jagger as Dr. Kubie
- Isabel Cooley as Nurse
- Christopher Guest as TV Director

== Reception ==
A TV writer for The New York Times made note of its non-chronological “ambitious time scheme” and called it “an exceptionally fine-tuned television drama.”
