= Haywire (book) =

1977 Brooke Hayward memoir

- First edition
- Author: Brooke Hayward
- Language: English
- Genre: Memoir
- Publisher: Alfred A. Knopf
- Publication date: February 1977
- Publication place: United States
- Media type: Print (hardcover and paperback)
- Pages: 329 (Vintage Books edition)
- ISBN: 978-0-307-73959-9 (Vintage Books edition)

Haywire is a 1977 memoir by actress and writer Brooke Hayward (born 1937), daughter of theatrical agent and producer Leland Hayward and actress Margaret Sullavan. It was a #1 New York Times Best Seller and was on the newspaper's list for 17 weeks. In Haywire, Brooke details her experience of growing up immersed in the glamorous and extravagant lifestyle afforded by her parents’ successful Hollywood and Broadway careers and tells the story of how her privileged, beautiful family and their seemingly idyllic life fell apart.

== Important characters ==
Leland Hayward – Brooke’s father, who was a charismatic person and prominent theatrical agent and stage, film, and television producer "who taught Fred Astaire how to dress and whom Katharine Hepburn called 'the most wonderful man in the world'–even after he ended their romance," who "thrived on the glamorous Hollywood scene." His clients included Fred Astaire, Jimmy Stewart, Henry Fonda, Ernest Hemingway, Judy Garland, Ginger Rogers, Billy Wilder, Gene Kelly, Myrna Loy, Herman Mankiewicz, Gene Fowler, Gregory Peck, William Wyler, Fredric March, Boris Karloff, Lillian Hellman, Helen Hayes, Dashiell Hammett, Greta Garbo, and Katharine Hepburn. He was a Tony Award-winning Broadway producer of Call Me Madam, South Pacific, Gypsy, The Sound of Music, and Mister Roberts, among others. His marriage to Margaret Sullavan (another client) ended in 1948, and he later married Nancy "Slim" Hawks (later Lady Keith), and Pamela Digby Churchill (later Harriman).

Margaret Sullavan – Brooke's mother, who was both a Hollywood and a Broadway star, by all accounts a superb actress, and known for her husky voice and "irresistible crooked grin." She performed with the University Players at Harvard, made her Broadway debut in 1926, and starred in 16 films including the classics Only Yesterday (1933), The Shop Around the Corner (1940), and Back Street (1941). Before Leland Hayward, she was married to actor Henry Fonda and director William Wyler. According to Brooke, she loathed Hollywood, was fanatical about her privacy, and was determined to bring up her children properly in a perfect, beautiful home. Her death at age 50 (in 1960) by barbiturate poisoning was ruled an accident.

Brooke Hayward – Brooke, who appeared on the cover of Life magazine when she was 15, became a model and actress before she wrote Haywire. Her film and television credits include Mad Dog Coll, the Twilight Zone episode "The Masks," and Six Degrees of Separation. She has been married to Michael Thomas, Dennis Hopper, and Peter Duchin, and lives in Connecticut and New York.

Bridget Hayward – Brooke’s younger sister. She was in and out of mental institutions in her teens, and worked at the Williamstown Theatre as an apprentice. She “succumbed to a recurrent, unexplained illness marked by epileptic seizures and bouts of severe depression” and her death at age 21 is considered to be a suicide.

William (Bill) Hayward – Brooke’s younger brother. He, too, was in and out of mental institutions such as the Menninger Foundation. He produced Easy Rider in partnership with Peter Fonda and loved motorcycles for the rest of his life. He shot himself in the heart in 2008.

== Contributors ==
Throughout Haywire, Hayward uses snippets of oral history from interviews she conducted with people who knew her immediate family members (several of whom were "family friends") to provide outside perspectives on what they were like and on how the family operated. These contributors include:

- James Stewart (Jimmy Stewart)
- Henry Fonda
- Jane Fonda
- Peter Fonda
- Truman Capote
- Sara Mankiewicz – wife of Herman J. Mankiewicz
- Tom Mankiewicz
- Paul Osborn
- Millicent Osborn – wife of Paul Osborn
- John Swope
- H. C. Potter (Hank Potter)
- Joseph Cotten (Joe Cotten)
- Joshua Logan (Josh Logan)
- William Wyler
- Diana Vreeland
- King Vidor – Margaret’s director on So Red the Rose
- Nancy (“Slim” Hayward) Keith – Leland Hayward’s wife after Sullavan
- Bill Francisco – Bridget Hayward’s boyfriend at the time of her death
- Edward H. Griffith (E. B. Griffiths) – Margaret’s director on Next Time We Love

Although their contributions (of “time, memories, and love”) are not marked as quotes in the text, Hayward acknowledges:

- Billy Wilder
- Fredric and Florence March
- Peter Hunt
- Charles and Ray Eames
- George Cukor
- Jules Stein
- Swifty Lazar
- George Axelrod
- Bill and Greta Wright
- Kenneth Wagg – Margaret Sullavan's husband at the time of her death
- Martha Edens
- Kathleen Malley

== Introduction and epilogue ==
The 2011 paperback edition includes an introduction by Hayward’s family friend Buck Henry – actor, director, and Oscar-nominated screenwriter (The Graduate) – and an epilogue by the author, both of which are dated May 2010. Henry introduces Leland and his "crazy kids," while Hayward’s epilogue discusses the years since Haywire was first published, thanks Henry for urging her to finish writing it, and, most notably, covers her brother William’s death (he shot himself in the heart in 2008). The "epilogue is remarkable for its uninflected tone. She offers nothing remotely consoling about redemption or overcoming adversity. And that is one of the most bracing and strangely affirming aspects of this book."

== Reception ==
Within a month of its publication, Haywire was “heading for what appears to be a huge commercial success.” It became a #1 New York Times Best Seller and was on the list for 17 weeks. The New York Times Book Review described it as "a Hollywood childhood memoir, a glowing tapestry spun with equal parts of gold and pain. As a book it is an absolute beauty – a Hollywood beauty, to be precise – with all the charm that term implies, the deceptive simplicity, the complex hidden machinery and, above all, the terrible cost." Critics commented that the book, although published when Brooke was 39, deals mostly with her life up to her early 20s and is mostly silent on her personal tragedies (the most evident of which were her failed marriages) that occurred in the intervening years. The later epilogue addresses this issue, albeit briefly.

Another New York Times reviewer wrote that one of Haywire’s themes contributed to a 1970s trend: "'Survival,' as opposed to action and creativity, seems to be the dominant motif in much of 70’s popular culture, especially in some books...Brooke Hayward’s childhood, described in Haywire, has been discussed as if it had been the domestic equivalent of an Iranian torture chamber."

== Movie ==
Haywire inspired a Warner Bros. TV movie by the same name. First aired in 1980, it was directed by Michael Tuchner and starred Lee Remick, Jason Robards, and Deborah Raffin. The film was produced by Brooke’s younger brother, Bill Hayward. A New York Times TV writer made note of its non-chronological “ambitious time scheme” and called it “an exceptionally fine-tuned television drama.”

== Work ==
- Hayward, Brooke (February 1977). Haywire (1 ed.). New York City: Alfred A. Knopf. ISBN 9780394493251. OCLC 2425290.
