= Michael M. Thomas =

American author (1936–2021)

- Born: Michael Mackenzie Thomas; April 18, 1936; Manhattan, New York, U.S.
- Died: August 7, 2021 (aged 85); Brooklyn, New York, U.S.
- Education: Yale University (BA)
- Spouses: Brooke Hayward (m. 1956; div. 1960) Wendell Adams (m. 1960; div. 1978) Barbara Siebel (m. 1982; div. 2008) Tamara Glenny (m. 2011–2021)
- Children: 6

Michael Mackenzie Thomas (April 18, 1936 – August 7, 2021) was an American author of nine bestselling novels and a partner at Lehman Brothers. Best known for his financial thrillers, he published his first novel, Green Monday, in 1980. He also published articles in New York Observer, Esquire, The New York Review of Books and The Wall Street Journal.

== Early life and education ==
Thomas was born in Manhattan on April 18, 1936. His father, Joseph A. Thomas, worked as an investment banker and became the youngest partner of Lehman Brothers at 29 years old, in the same year of Thomas's birth. His mother, Elinor (Bangs) Thomas, was a real estate broker whose ancestors arrived on the Mayflower. Thomas was raised on the Upper East Side and attended the Buckley School, where he served as an editor of its literary magazine, before graduating from Phillips Exeter Academy. He went on to study art history at Yale University, his father's alma mater. After graduating in 1958, he taught at Yale for a year.

== Career ==
Thomas joined the Metropolitan Museum of Art as an assistant curator in 1959, responsible for European paintings. Although he intended to become an art dealer, his father disapproved of this. Thomas joined the staff of Lehman Brothers two years later; his father was not consulted on this beforehand, and this soured their relationship. Thomas was made a partner in 1967, and was a board member of 20th Century Fox and the Los Angeles Rams. He became head of mergers and acquisitions in 1971, but ultimately quit Lehman Brothers that same year after feeling "betrayed" by the firm.

Thomas went on to work as a consultant, and began writing novels in 1980. His first book, Green Monday, was a bestseller. His second novel, Someone Else's Money, drew on Thomas' knowledge of art and art dealing as well as Wall Street, and the economist Robert Lekachman noted in The New York Times Book Review that "Thomas knows both these environments intimately enough to detest most of the characters he has drawn, one suspects, from living models." Seven years later, Thomas began writing a long-running column, The Midas Watch, for The New York Observer. Thomas once detailed his subject matter to the New York Times as "social climbers, stock market papermongers, real estate shills and assorted other virtuosos of hype and blather." Charlotte Curtis described his early works in The New York Times as "extremely unkind to the rich and fashionable", adding that his magazine articles "are said to have indulged in gratuitously cruel people-bashing". He consequently became an outcast among the city's high society. Approximately 25 publishing houses rejected his eighth novel, Love & Money (2009), and it eventually took him over a decade to secure one. His final novel, Fixers, was published in 2016.

== Personal life ==
Thomas married his first wife, Brooke Hayward, in 1956. She was the daughter of actress Margaret Sullavan and agent/producer Leland Hayward. The couple had two children: Jeffrey and William. He married his second wife, Wendell Adams, in 1960. Together, they had three children: Michael, Leslie, and Dorrit. They separated in 1978, and he subsequently married Barbara Siebel four years later. They had one child, Francis. His fourth and final marriage was to Tamara Glenny. They met online in 2003, got married eight years later, and remained married until his death.

Thomas died on August 7, 2021, at a hospital in Brooklyn, New York. He was 85, and suffered from complications of arthritis prior to his death, which was caused by a bacterial infection.

== Works ==
- Fixers (2016)
- Love & Money (2009)
- Baker's Dozen (1996) ISBN 9780374108571
- Black Money (1995) ISBN 9780517595237
- Hanover Place (1990)
- The Ropespinner Conspiracy (1987) ISBN 9780446346764
- Hard Money (1985) ISBN 9780670531103
- Someone Else's Money (1982)
- Green Monday (1980)
