= Frank Castle (disambiguation) =

Frank Castle is the civilian name of the fictional character the Punisher.

Frank Castle may also refer to:

- Frank Castle (rugby league), English sprint athlete, rugby union, and rugby league footballer
- Frank Castle (author), American western and crime fiction author
- Frank Castle (Marvel Cinematic Universe), fictional character

== See also ==
- Castle Frank
- Castle Frank (TTC)
