= The Shining Hour (play) =

1934 play written by Keith Winter

- Original language: English
- Written by: Keith Winter
- Genre: Drama
- Setting: Elizabethan farmhouse living room in Yorkshire

Premiere
- Date: February 13, 1934
- Place: Booth Theatre; New York City, New York

The Shining Hour is a 1934 Broadway three-act drama written by Keith Winter, produced by Max Gordon and staged by Raymond Massey with scenic design created by Aubrey Hammond. It ran for 121 performances from February 13, 1934, to May 1934 at the Booth Theatre. This was Gladys Cooper's Broadway debut. Raymond Massey and Adrianne Allen were a married couple at this time.

The play was included in Burns Mantle's The Best Plays of 1933–1934.

It was adapted into the 1938 film The Shining Hour directed by Frank Borzage and starring Joan Crawford, Robert Young, Margaret Sullavan and Melvyn Douglas.

== Cast ==
- Adrianne Allen as Judy Linden
- Gladys Cooper as Mariella Linden
- Marjorie Fielding as Hannah Linden
- Raymond Massey as David Linden
- Cyril Raymond as Henry Linden
- Derek Williams as Mickey Linden
