= Brooke Hayward =

American actress (born 1937)

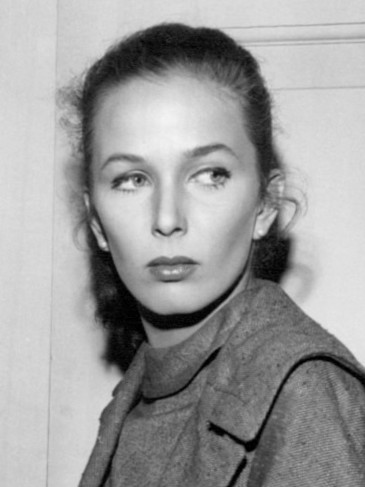
- Hayward in 1961
- Born: July 5, 1937 (age 89); Los Angeles, California, U.S.
- Other name: Brooke Hayward Duchin
- Education: Vassar College
- Occupation: Actress
- Years active: 1961–1993
- Spouses: Michael M. Thomas (m. 1956; div. 1960) Dennis Hopper (m. 1961; div. 1969) Peter Duchin (m. 1985; div. 2011)
- Children: 3
- Parent(s): Leland Hayward; Margaret Sullavan
- Relatives: William Hayward (grandfather); Monroe Hayward (great-grandfather); Descendants of Robert Coe

Brooke Hayward (born July 5, 1937) is an American actress. Her memoir, Haywire, was a best-seller.

== Early life and education ==
Born in Los Angeles in 1937, Hayward is the eldest of three children born to agent turned film, television, and stage producer Leland Hayward and actress Margaret Sullavan. Brooke Hayward is a great-granddaughter of Monroe Hayward, former U.S. Senator-elect from Nebraska, and the granddaughter of Colonel William Hayward, who led the United States' 369th Infantry Regiment, aka the "Harlem Hellfighters", the first regiment composed entirely of African-American soldiers during the First World War. She is also a descendant of Mayflower passenger William White, and Puritan colonist Robert Coe. Hayward had a younger sister, Bridget, who died of a drug overdose, and a brother, producer William Hayward III, known as "Bill Hayward", who died by suicide.

When Hayward was seven years old, the family moved to a farm in Brookfield, Connecticut. Hayward's parents divorced in April 1948. The following year, Hayward's father married Nancy "Slim" Hawks (later known as Slim Keith). After his divorce from Slim Hawks, Leland Hayward married Pamela Harriman. Her mother married importer and producer Kenneth Wagg in 1950. Margaret Sullavan died of an accidental drug overdose on January 1, 1960. Nine months later, on October 17, 1960, Hayward's younger sister Bridget was found dead of a drug overdose in her apartment in New York City. Bridget left what was described as an "incoherent note", the contents of which never were made public. Her death was ruled a suicide. Hayward's brother Bill died of a self-inflicted gunshot wound on March 9, 2008.

Hayward attended Vassar College and studied acting with Lee Strasberg at the Actors Studio.

== Career ==
As a model, Hayward appeared on the August 15, 1959, cover of Vogue, shot by Horst P. Horst.

In May 1961, Hayward made her Broadway debut in the stage production of Mandingo opposite her future husband Dennis Hopper. She made her film debut that same year in Burt Balaban's Mad Dog Coll. In one early episode of Bonanza ("The Storm", 1962), she played sea-ship captain's daughter Laura White. She delivered a memorable performance in the Twilight Zone episode "The Masks" in March 1964. Over the next 30 years, Hayward appeared in a handful of screen roles.

Throughout the 1960s, while married to actor, director, and photographer Dennis Hopper, Hayward took an active role in the contemporary art world, collecting works by such artists as Andy Warhol, Ed Ruscha, Frank Stella, and Roy Lichtenstein. She was also an avid collector of antiques from various periods and known for a highly idiosyncratic sense of design, as demonstrated by the house she shared with Hopper and their children, 1712 North Crescent Heights Boulevard in Los Angeles.

In 1977, Hayward wrote the best-seller Haywire, a childhood memoir that expounded on her family, the mental breakdowns of her mother and sister, and her own personal demons. Her last screen appearance was in a small role in John Guare's 1993 film adaptation of Six Degrees of Separation, with Stockard Channing, Donald Sutherland, and Will Smith.

== Personal life ==
Hayward was married to Michael M. Thomas from July 1956 until their July 1960 divorce. They had two sons.

Hayward met actor Dennis Hopper when they were both cast in Mandingo on Broadway in the spring of 1961. They were married in August 1961. They had a daughter, designer Marin Brooke Hopper, in June 1962 and together went on to be a force at the center of the creative scene in Los Angeles in the 1960s, collecting Pop art and enjoying a high degree of access to the worlds of contemporary art, rock music, and Hollywood. They separated in 1968 and divorced in 1969. The story of Hayward and Hopper's marriage, along with their childhoods and later lives, was told by Mark Rozzo in the best-selling 2022 cultural history/biography Everybody Thought We Were Crazy.

Hayward married Peter Duchin, the musician and orchestra leader, in 1985. They divorced in 2008.

Hayward was Jane Fonda's best friend growing up. Fonda stated in 2017: "Unfortunately, we are no longer friends which makes me sad."

A New York Social Diary interview with Brooke Hayward Duchin, published on February 5, 2021, includes this exchange:

• Is [Jane Fonda] still a close friend of yours? It seemed like you had a really lovely friendship. • I haven’t seen Jane in a long time. We parted company long ago with the Black Panthers when she was Hanoi Jane. I’m sure that I’ll think of Jane until the day I die, but you know, she’s now on some other track.

== Filmography ==
=== Film ===
Year	Title	Role	Notes
1961	Mad Dog Coll	Elizabeth	
1966	Screen Tests #25	—N/a	Short
1973	The Day of the Dolphin	Women's Club	
1988	Unauthorized Biography: Jane Fonda	—N/a	Documentary
1991	Crazy About the Movies: Dennis Hopper	—N/a	Documentary
1993	Six Degrees of Separation	Connie	

=== Television ===
Year	Title	Role	Notes
1961	Target: The Corruptors!	Mary	Season 1 Episode 13: "The Fix"
1962	General Electric Theater	Margie Graham	Season 10 Episode 17: "The Hold-Out"
1962	Bonanza	Laura White	Season 3 Episode 19: "The Storm"
1963	The Alfred Hitchcock Hour	Barbara Simms	Season 2 Episode 8: "The Cadaver"
1964	The Twilight Zone	Paula Harper	Season 5 Episode 25: "The Masks"
1964	The Rogues	Kate	Season 1 Episode 8: "Two of a Kind"

== Selected works ==
- Hayward, Brooke (1977). Haywire. New York City: Alfred A. Knopf (published February 1977). ISBN 9780394493251. OCLC 2425290.
