= No Sad Songs for Me =

1950 film by Rudolph Maté

- Film poster
- Directed by: Rudolph Maté
- Written by: Howard Koch
- Based on: No Sad Songs for Me (1944 novel) by Ruth Southard
- Produced by: Buddy Adler
- Starring: Margaret Sullavan; Wendell Corey; Viveca Lindfors; Natalie Wood
- Cinematography: Joseph Walker
- Edited by: William A. Lyon
- Music by: George Duning
- Production company: Columbia Pictures
- Distributed by: Columbia Pictures
- Release dates: April 27, 1950 (New York); May 21, 1950 (Los Angeles)
- Running time: 88 minutes
- Country: United States
- Language: English

No Sad Songs for Me is a 1950 American drama film directed by Rudolph Maté and starring Margaret Sullavan in her last film role as a woman dying of cancer. It was nominated for an Academy Award for Best Music Scoring in 1951.

== Plot ==
Mary Scott thought that she had become pregnant, but instead she learns from her physician that she has terminal cancer with only ten months to live, about 6 months on her feet. She receives the doctor's assurance to keep her illness a secret and not tell her husband Bradley and young daughter Polly. She wants to live her last year with each minute happy and important. Brad, a surveyor, is aided by a new assistant, female draftsman Chris Radna.

Polly's joy during the Christmas season is evident. Mary insists they invite Chris to the annual party, where Brad sees Chris in a dress for the first time, and he flirts and dances with her all night. Brad is paying so much attention to Chris that Mary hears some women gossiping about it in the ladies' room. She is sure that her secrecy is protecting her family, but she is still hurt. It becomes clear that Brad and Chris are falling in love.

Mary visits her father in San Francisco but cannot tell him about her illness. She decides that if her husband no longer loves her, suicide may be the answer. Brad, who does love Mary, admits to the affair and expresses remorse. Mary secretly visits Chris, who also expresses her regret. Her first husband died in World War II and she never expected to experience love again.

Mary realizes that Brad and Chris are compatible and notices that Chris and Polly also have a good relationship, so she convinces Chris to stay with the family. Mary likes Chris and believes that she would be a good wife for Brad. Mary subtly prompts the family members to consider their lives without her. Because she loves her family, she wants to make her death and their lives as easy as possible.

One day, Brad finds Mary's pain pills and visits the doctor, who informs him of Mary's condition. Brad experiences an emotional breakdown and begs the doctor to save Mary, but her case is too advanced for treatment. However, Brad keeps the secret and tries to make Mary's last weeks wonderful by taking her on an idyllic vacation to Mexico, where Mary dies.

== Cast ==
- Margaret Sullavan as Mary Scott
- Wendell Corey as Bradford "Brad" Scott
- Viveca Lindfors as Chris Radna
- Natalie Wood as Polly Scott
- John McIntire as Dr. Ralph Frene
- Ann Doran as Louise Spears
- Richard Quine as Brownie
- Jeanette Nolan as Mona Frene
- Dorothy Tree as Frieda Miles
- Raymond Greenleaf as Mr. Caswell
- Urylee Leonardos as Flora

== Reception ==
In a contemporary review for The New York Times, critic Bosley Crowther called No Sad Songs for Me "a softly affecting little drama" and wrote:

[Sullavan] has been provided with a very good script by Howard Koch—a script which is not only literate but which protects the situation with high ideals—and Rudolph Mate's direction is crisp and sensitive. And the acting support of her associates—especially of Wendell Corey as the spouse—is of an accomplished order to match that of Miss Sullavan. ... But the honors still go to Miss Sullavan, who carries a difficult role, which could be distasteful and depressing, with fluent and elevating grace. Not since Bette Davis played "Dark Victory" several years ago has a subject of such peculiar anguish been handled so delicately. Now that Miss Sullavan is back among us, with her glowing smile and her melting voice, let's hope that we'll be seeing her often. And let's hope that next time she doesn't die.

Critic Philip K. Scheuer of the Los Angeles Times wrote: "'The fact that it is cancer adds to its immediacy and present hopelessness-in-the face-of-hope. The spotlight, however, is on the woman and not on the condition; both scripter, Howard Koch, and director, Rudolph Mate, have concentrated on its effects rather than its cause or cure. The result may not be too imaginative on the one hand nor very documentary on the other, but it is always in good taste and close enough to life—and death—to reduce the onlooker to unashamed tears. So the sad song is sung in spite of everything."
