= Lou Wagner =

American actor

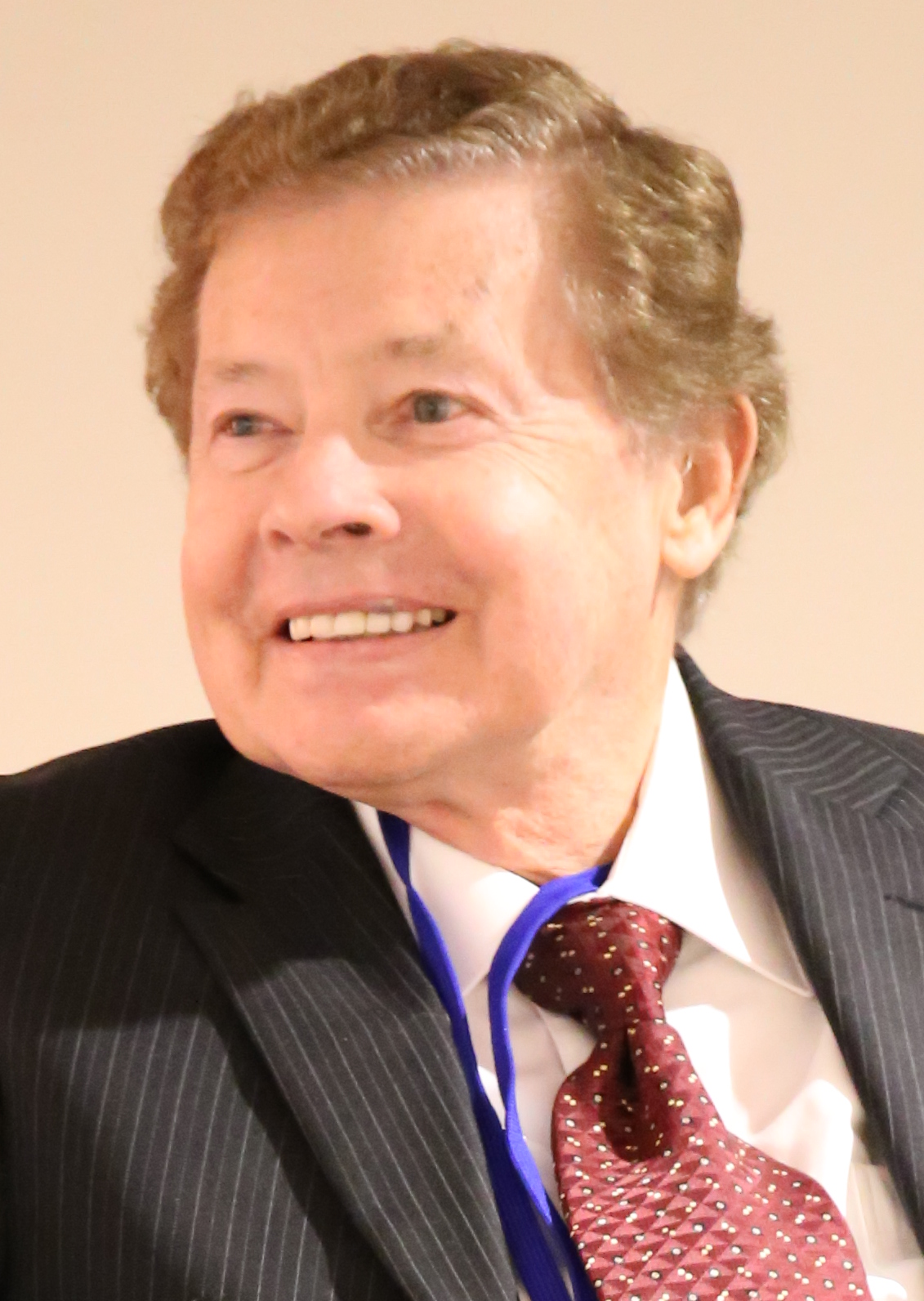
- Wagner in 2015
- Born: August 19, 1940 (age 86); San Jose, California, US
- Occupation: Actor
- Years active: 1966–present

Lou Wagner (born August 19, 1940) is an American actor. Wagner started out as an actor in his twenties, notably appearing in Jack Webb's revival series, Dragnet 1967 several times (in different roles), and the hugely-successful Airport as a young passenger Schuyler Schultz, traveling with his parents.

Wagner portrayed Lucius in the 1968 film, Planet of the Apes, and played mechanic Harlan Arliss in the NBC television series CHiPs from 1978 to 1983.

As of 2026, Wagner is one of the last two surviving principal cast members of Planet of the Apes along with Linda Harrison.

== Filmography ==
- Lost in Space (1967, TV Series) as J-5 Season 3 Episode, "The Haunted Lighthouse".
- Planet of the Apes (1968) as Lucius
- Mayberry R.F.D. (1968, TV Series) as Murphy
- Dragnet 1967 (1968-1969, TV Series) as Caretaker / Andy Raynor / John Dietz / Dennis J. Meldon
- Hello Down There (1969) as Marvin Webster
- Airport (1970) as Schuyler Schultz
- Pufnstuf (1970)
- The Virginian (1971, TV Series) as Mr. Hill
- Alias Smith and Jones (1971, TV Series) as Butler
- Nichols (1972, TV Series) as McKeever
- Conquest of the Planet of the Apes (1972) as Busboy
- Goodnight, My Love (1972, TV Movie) as Sally
- McMillan & Wife (1973, TV Series) as Willie Marsnak
- Chase (1973, TV Series) as Mouse
- Columbo: Mind Over Mayhem (1974, TV Series) as Ross
- Happy Days (1974, TV Series) as Mr. Schnieber
- Matt Helm (1975, TV Series)
- The UFO Incident (1975, TV Movie) as The Leader
- Switch (1976, TV Series) as Inky Davis
- Mirrors (1978) as Chet
- Quincy, M.E. (1979, TV Series) as Jockey Billy McGinn
- The Baltimore Bullet (1980) as Savannah Shorty
- Gorp (1980) as Federman
- CHiPs (1978–1983, TV Series) as Harlan Arliss
- Crazy Like a Fox (1986, TV Series)
- Hunter (1989, TV Series) as Garth
- The Golden Girls (1992, TV Series) as Larry
- Star Trek: The Next Generation (1992, TV Series) as DaiMon Solok
- Star Trek: Deep Space Nine (1993, TV Series) as Krax
- L.A. Law (1993, TV Series) as Appraiser
- Sodbusters (1994, TV Movie) as Shorty Simms
- Coach (1994, TV Series) as Arthur
- In This Corner (1994) as Referee
- Night Stand with Dick Dietrick (1996, TV Series) as George
- Galgameth (1996) as Zethar
- Sunsplit (1997) as Kurt Pasakivi
- Providence (1999, TV Series) as Weird Job Applicant
- Yes, Dear (2000-2006, TV Series) as Mike Werle / Mike / Mr. Bradley
- Starry Night (2001), as Gabe Burton
- James Dean (2001, TV Movie) as 'Eden' Makeup Person
- Girlfriends (2003, TV Series) as Dr. Garrett / Dr. Michael Garrett
- Chopping Block (2005) as Joe Rozzi
- My Name Is Earl (2006, TV Series) as Mr. Covington
- Harold (2008) as Principal Nelson
- Artificially Speaking (2009, Short) as Dr. Lionel Bainbridge
- Raising Hope (2010–2014, TV Series) as Attorney Wally Phipps
- The Millers (2013–2014, TV Series) as Mr. Booms
- Honey Jar: Chase for the Gold (2016) as Coach Felton
- Chicanery (2017) as Ben Gitzel
