= William Hayward (American attorney) =

American lawyer and army officer (1877-1944)

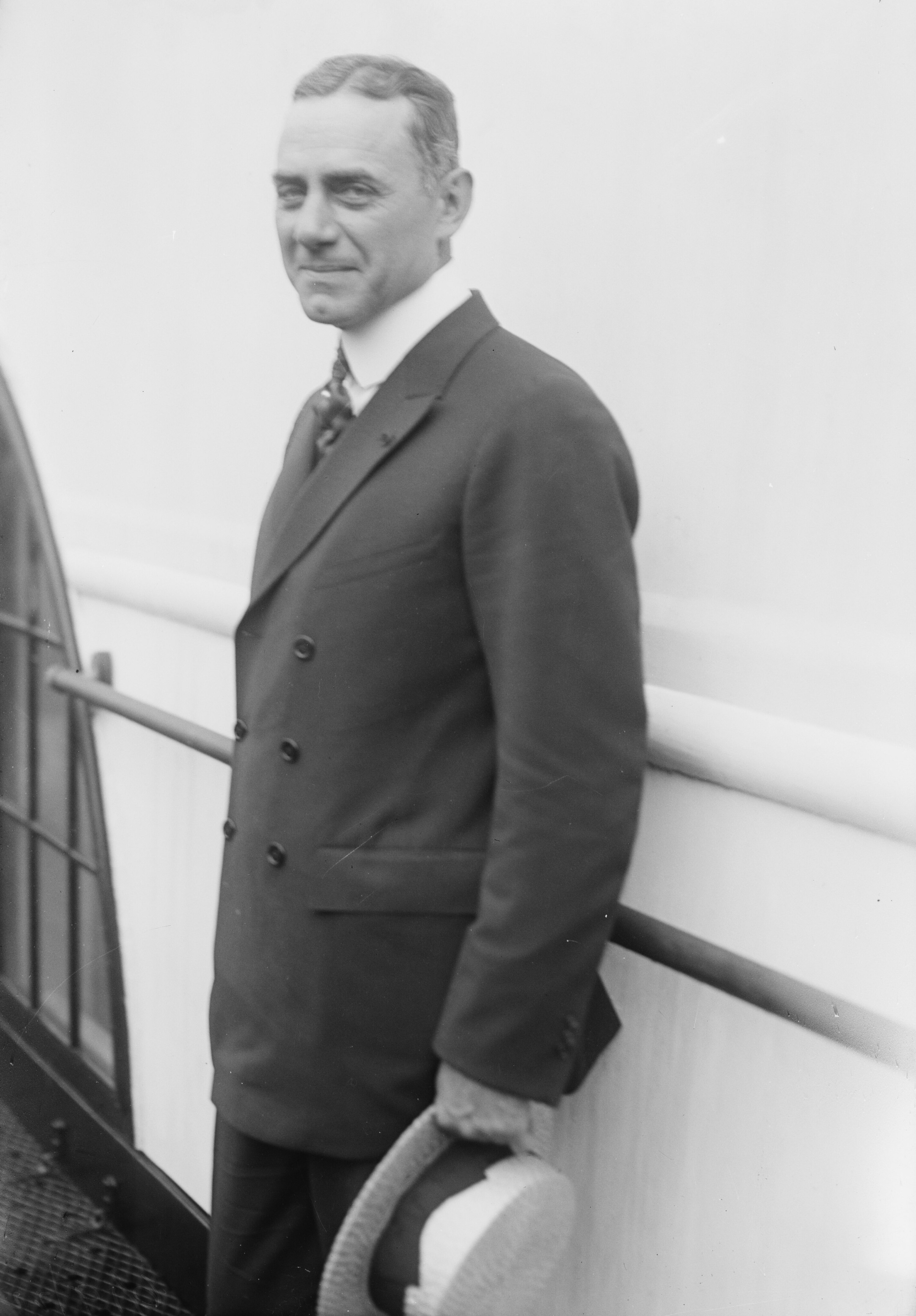
- Hayward c. 1915–1920

United States Attorney for the Southern District of New York
- In office June 1921 – March 2, 1925
- Appointed by: Warren Harding
- Preceded by: Francis Gordon Caffey
- Succeeded by: Emory Buckner

Member of the New York Public Service Commission from the 1st district
- In office c. 1915–1918

Personal details
- Born: April 29, 1877 Nebraska City, Nebraska, U.S.
- Died: October 13, 1944 (aged 67) Manhattan, New York, U.S.
- Relations: Monroe Hayward (father); Brooke Hayward (granddaughter)
- Children: Leland Hayward
- Education: University of Nebraska (BA)

Military service
- Allegiance: United States
- Branch/service: United States Army
- Years of service: 1898; 1917–1919
- Rank: Colonel
- Unit: 2nd Nebraska Volunteer Infantry Regiment; 369th Infantry Regiment
- Battles/wars: Spanish–American War; World War I

William Hayward (April 29, 1877 – October 13, 1944) was an American lawyer and U.S. Army officer known for commanding the Harlem Hellfighters during World War I.

== Early life and education ==
Hayward was born on April 29, 1877, in Nebraska City, Nebraska, the son of Nebraska Senator Monroe Hayward and Jane Pelton. He graduated from Nebraska City High School in 1893. After high school, Hayward attended the University of Nebraska, where he was prominent in athletics and a member of Phi Delta Theta. He graduated in 1897. He took graduate courses in Munich, Germany, from 1896 to 1897.

== Career ==
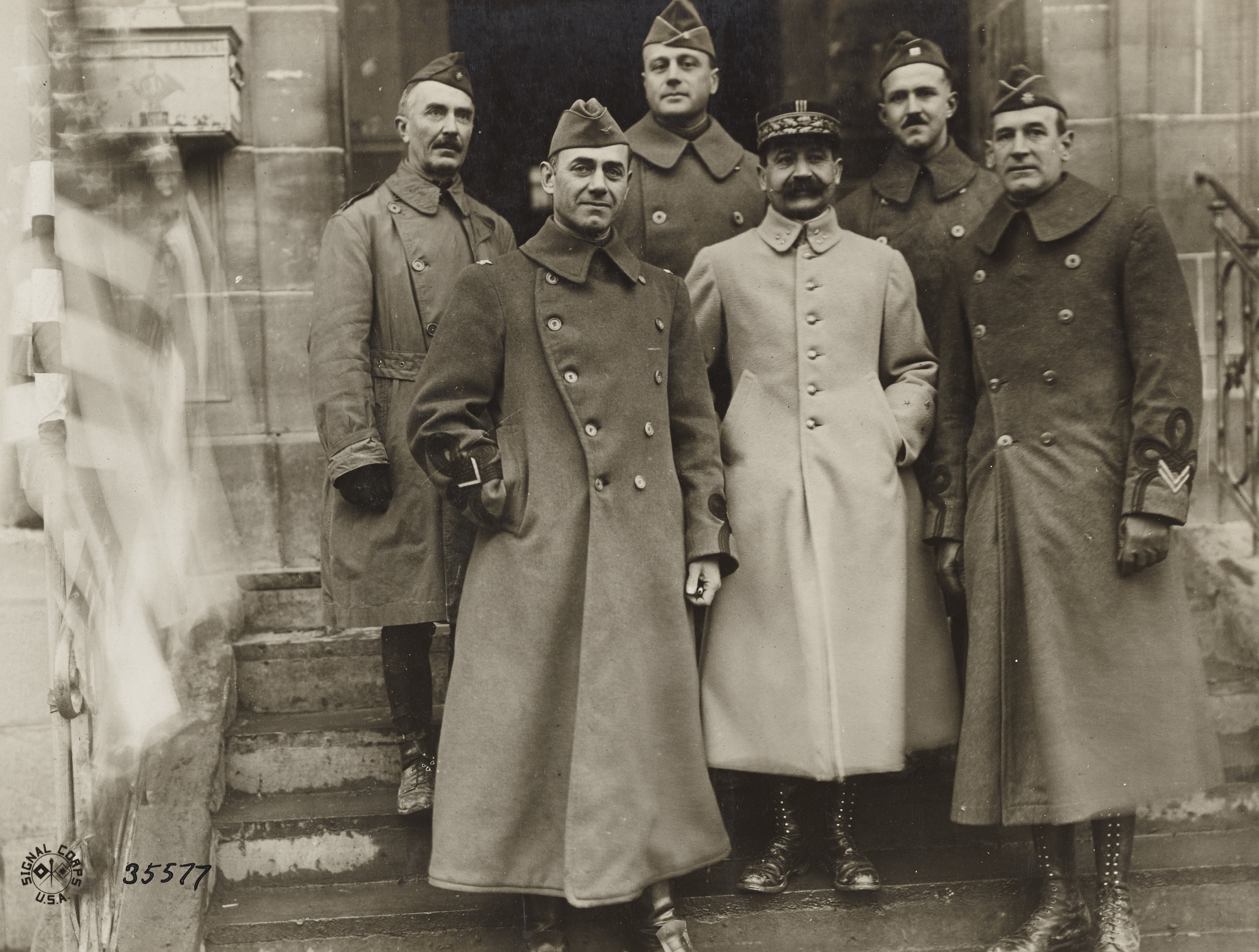
Colonel Haywood (front row, left) with American and French officers in France, December 1918

Hayward began practicing law in Nebraska City in 1897. When the Spanish–American War began, he became a captain in the Second Nebraska Volunteer Infantry. He was subsequently promoted to major, and then colonel of the regiment. In 1899, he served as his father's private secretary when the latter was Senator. From 1901 to 1902, he was county judge of Otoe County. He was elected chairman of the Nebraska Republican State Committee three times, and in 1908 he was made secretary of the Republican National Committee. President William Howard Taft offered to make him first assistant postmaster general, but he declined the offer and continued his law practice.

In the 1910 United States House of Representatives election, Hayward was the Republican candidate for Nebraska's 1st congressional district. He lost the election to Democratic incumbent John A. Maguire. After the election, he travelled around the world. Upon his return, he settled in New York City and began practicing law there as a member of the firm Wing & Russell on 14 Wall Street from 1911 to 1912. In 1913, he became deputy assistant New York County District Attorney. In 1914, he became the assistant district attorney. He then managed Charles Seymour Whitman's gubernatorial campaign. In 1915, Governor Whitman appointed him counsel to the governor, and later that year, he served as counsel to a New York State Legislature committee to investigate the New York Public Service Commission. He was then appointed a public service commissioner for the first district, resigning from the position in 1918.

When America entered World War I, Hayward transferred himself into active duty in the National Guard as a colonel of Infantry. As there were regiments available for him, he recruited, trained, and uniformed the 15th New York Infantry, an all-black volunteer regiment. The regiment was later nicknamed the Harlem Hellfighters. The regiment, designated the 369th Infantry Regiment, arrived in Europe in the spring of 1917. General Pershing, under whom Hayward served as a cadet at the University of Nebraska, had the regiment fight with the French. They fought at the front for 191 days, longer than any other American regiment, and participated in the Champagne-Marne, Aisne-Marne, and Meuse-Argonne campaigns. Hayward was awarded the Croix de Guerre with gold palm and silver star and the Distinguished Service Medal, was commended by Marshal Foch and General Pershing, and was made an officer of the Legion of Honour thanks to the recommendation of General Petain. He was mustered out with the rest of the regiment in March 1919.

In 1921, Hayward was appointed United States attorney for the Southern District of New York, an office he held until 1925. He was chairman of the 1920 State Republican Convention, and was a delegate to the 1924 Republican National Convention. In 1926 and 1927, he and his stepson Philip Manwaring Plant hunted big game in Africa and gave a number of trophies to the Museum of Natural History. In 1929, he and Plant went to Franz Josef Land in the Arctic and brought back several live polar bears for the Bronx Zoo and one for the Prospect Park Zoo.

Hayward was a member of Phi Delta Phi, Theta Nu Epsilon, the National Geographic Society, the New York State Bar Association, the New York City Bar Association, the United Spanish War Veterans, the Sons of the American Revolution, the Union League Club, the University Club of New York, the Atlantic Yacht Club, the Naval and Military Order of the Spanish War, and the American Legion.

== Personal life ==
In 1901, he married Sarah Coe Ireland. They divorced in 1912. In 1919, he married Mae C. Plant, the widow of Mortimer F. Plant. His son from his first marriage was theatrical agent Leland Hayward. His granddaughter, Brooke Hayward, was an actress. His great-granddaughter, Marin Hopper, is a designer.

Hayward died in Doctors Hospital on October 13, 1944. At his funeral in St. Bartholomew's Church, seventeen officers from his old regiment (including congressman Hamilton Fish, who was a major in the regiment) served as honorary pallbearers, and 60 black members of the regiment formed a guard of honor around the coffin. He was buried in Cedar Grove Cemetery in New London, Connecticut.

Legal offices
Preceded by Francis Gordon Caffey	United States Attorney for the Southern District of New York; 1921–1925	Succeeded by Emory Buckner
