= Clare Sandars =

British actor

- Born: Clare Rosemary Sandars; 24 April 1934; London, United Kingdom
- Died: 3 November 2007 (aged 73)
- Other names: Clare Lady McEwan of Bardrochat; Clare Rosemary Wagg
- Occupation: Child actor
- Years active: 1942
- Notable work: Mrs. Miniver
- Spouses: Sir James Napier Finnie McEwen, 4th Baronet (m. 1958) Kenneth Wagg (m. 1973; died 2000)
- Children: 3
- Relatives: Henry Cyril Percy Graves, 5th Baron Graves (paternal great-grandfather); Gervase Elwes (maternal grandfather)

Clare Rosemary Sandars (1934–2007) was a British former child actor.

== Early life ==
Clare Rosemary Saunders was born on the 24 April 1934 in London, to Margaret Mary Elwes and John William Eric Graves Sandars, a businessman and maltster.

Through her father, Sandars' was the great-granddaughter of Henry Cyril Percy Graves, 5th Baron Graves. Through her mother, Sandars was the granddaughter of Gervase Elwes and Lady Winefride Mary Elizabeth Elwes (née Feilding).

== Career ==
During World War II, Sandars was evacuated to the United States. During her time in America, Sandars was selected to appeared as Mrs. Miniver's daughter Judy in Mrs. Miniver. Sandars' performance was praised by Bosley Crowther.

Sandars also appeared in Journey for Margaret and Eagle Squadron.

== Post-career ==
Sandars was a Lady-in-waiting to Hermione Knox, Countess of Ranfurly in the British Bahamas.

In September 1958, Sandars married Sir James Napier Finnie McEwen, Bt. at St Thomas of Canterbury Church, Gainsborough. The couple had three daughters. In 1973, Sandars married Kenneth Wagg.

Sandars died on 3 November 2007.

== Filmography ==
Year	Title	Role	Notes	Ref(s)
1942	Mrs. Miniver	Judy Miniver		
1942	Eagle Squadron	Child	Uncredited	
1942	Journey for Margaret	Little Girl	Final film role	
