= The Shopworn Angel =

1938 film by H. C. Potter

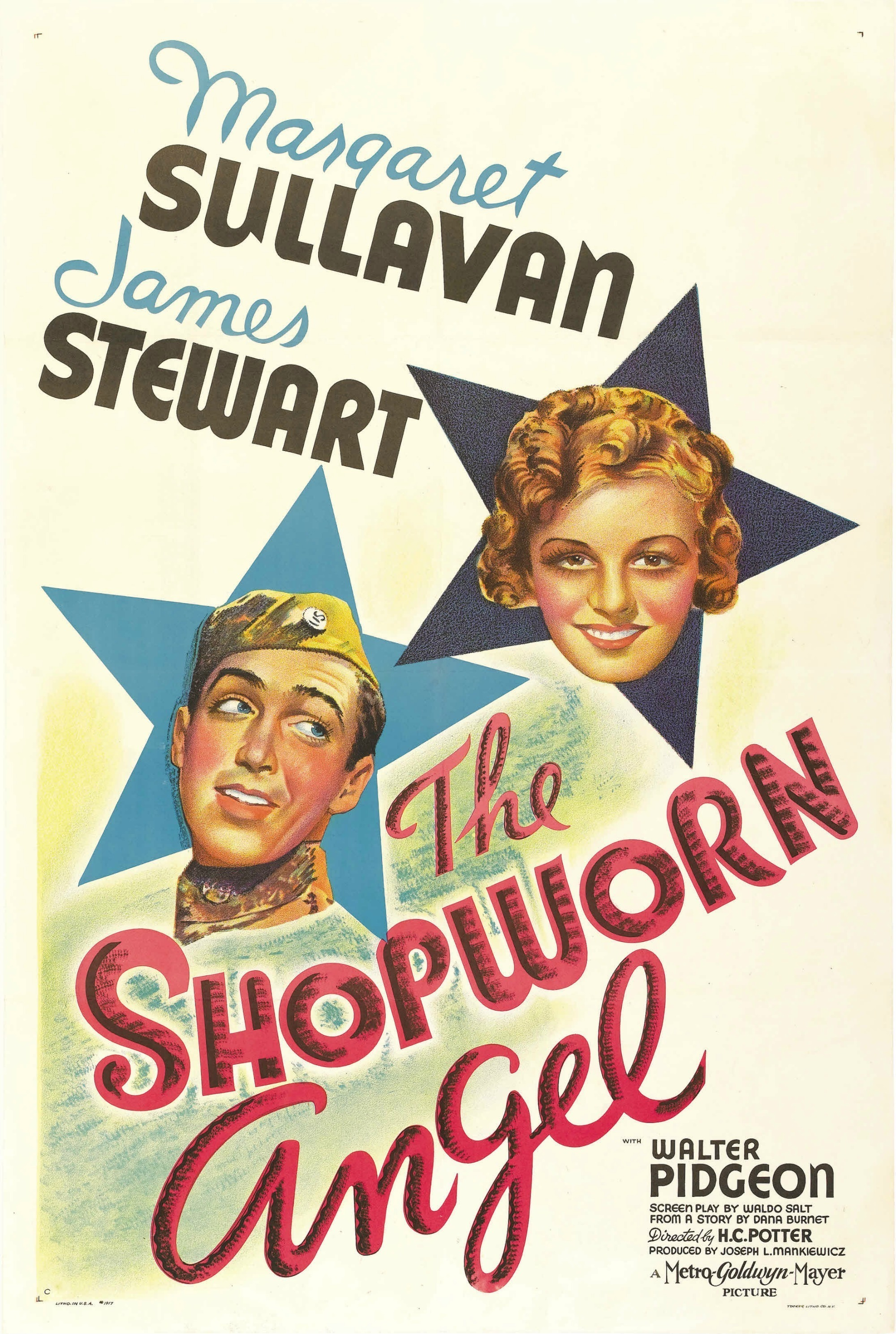
- Theatrical release poster
- Directed by: H.C. Potter
- Written by: Howard Estabrook; Waldo Salt
- Based on: "Private Pettigrew's Girl"; 1918 short story by Dana Burnet
- Produced by: Joseph L. Mankiewicz
- Starring: Margaret Sullavan; James Stewart; Walter Pidgeon
- Cinematography: Joseph Ruttenberg; William H. Daniels (uncredited)
- Edited by: W. Donn Hayes
- Music by: Edward Ward
- Production company: Metro-Goldwyn-Mayer
- Distributed by: Loew's Inc.
- Release date: July 15, 1938 (USA)
- Running time: 85 minutes
- Country: United States
- Language: English
- Budget: $531,000
- Box office: $1,042,000

The Shopworn Angel is a 1938 American drama film directed by H. C. Potter and starring Margaret Sullavan and James Stewart, with Walter Pidgeon in a featured role. The MGM release featured the second screen pairing of Sullavan and Stewart following their successful teaming in the Universal Pictures production Next Time We Love two years earlier.

The screenplay by Waldo Salt is the third feature film adaptation of a Dana Burnet short story, "Private Pettigrew's Girl", originally published in the Saturday Evening Post in 1918. The first version was Pettigrew's Girl, a silent film released in 1919, and the second was The Shopworn Angel (1928), a part-talkie released by Paramount Pictures starring Nancy Carroll, Gary Cooper, and Paul Lukas.

== Plot ==
After the United States enters World War I in 1917, the limousine carrying Daisy Heath, a sophisticated Broadway musical theatre star, knocks down Bill Pettigrew, a naive young soldier from Texas. A policeman orders the chauffeur to take Bill back to camp. During the ride, he becomes slightly acquainted with the cynical, but not cold-hearted Daisy.

Upon their arrival at the army camp, Bill lets his buddies assume that Daisy is the date he had lied about. In fact, he has no one. When they find out the truth, they decide to get even. On their next leave, they take Bill to Daisy's show, so he can introduce them. However, Daisy pretends that she is Bill's girl. As they spend more time together, she begins to warm to him, much to the increasing jealousy of her wealthy real boyfriend, Sam Bailey, who is financing Daisy's show.

When Sam takes Daisy out for an afternoon at his Connecticut estate for the first time, she tells him that Bill has shown her what true love looks like and made her realize she actually does love Sam. She also believes that the rivalry has also given new depth to Sam's love for her.

That same day, Bill learns that his unit is finally going to ship out for the fighting in Europe. When he cannot get a leave, he goes AWOL so he can propose marriage. Daisy opts to accept so that he can sail for France with something to look forward to. Sam objects to the odd arrangement privately to Daisy, but kindly refrains from telling Bill the truth. The two marry; then Bill has to leave immediately.

He sends her cheerful letters every day. Then, a letter comes from the War Department. As Daisy is in the middle of a performance, her maid Martha takes it to Sam, sitting in the audience. When Sam opens the letter, Bill's ID tag falls out. Daisy sees it, tears fill her eyes as she realizes that Bill has been killed, but she bravely finishes singing "Pack Up Your Troubles in Your Old Kit-Bag".

== Cast ==
- Margaret Sullavan as Daisy Heath
- James Stewart as Bill Pettigrew
- Walter Pidgeon as Sam Bailey
- Hattie McDaniel as Martha
- Nat Pendleton as "Dice", one of Bill's army buddies
- Alan Curtis as "Thin Lips", another army buddy
- Sam Levene as "Leer", an army buddy
- Eleanor Lynn as Sally
- Charles D. Brown as McGonigle, Daisy's boss

== Production ==
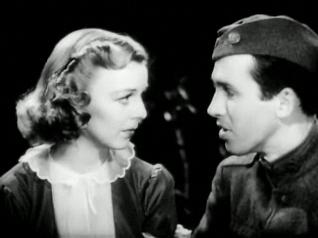
Margaret Sullavan and James Stewart

The film underwent major personnel changes during its development stages. The directing assignment first went to Richard Thorpe, then Julien Duvivier, before Potter was given the task. Jean Harlow was originally cast as Daisy Heath, but died before filming began. She initially was replaced by Joan Crawford, who then yielded the role to Rosalind Russell, before newly signed MGM contract player Sullavan finally came on board. Melvyn Douglas originally was signed to play Sam Bailey, but the role ultimately went to Walter Pidgeon.

First-time screenwriter Salt had to adhere to the strict regulations of the Hays Code, which required him to dilute many of the sexually explicit elements of the preceding film versions of the story. This included transforming Daisy from a hard-edged chorus girl into a leading lady and Sam from her gangster lover into her wealthy, high society boyfriend.

Although not deemed an official remake of The Shopworn Angel, the Paramount Pictures film That Kind of Woman (1959) shared a very similar plot.

== Critical reception ==
Time described the film as "a tearjerker in the grand manner — simple, senile and heroically sentimental."

== Box office ==
According to MGM records the film earned $722,000 in the US and Canada and $320,000 elsewhere resulting in a profit of $146,000.

== Soundtrack ==
The film's soundtrack included tunes popular during World War I such as "You're in the Army Now," "Over There," "Stars and Stripes Forever," "K-K-K-Katy," "The Darktown Strutters' Ball," "(There Are) Smiles," and "Pack Up Your Troubles In Your Old Kit-Bag and Smile, Smile, Smile!." Margaret Sullavan's vocals were dubbed by Mary Martin.
