= The Shining Hour =

1938 film by Frank Borzage

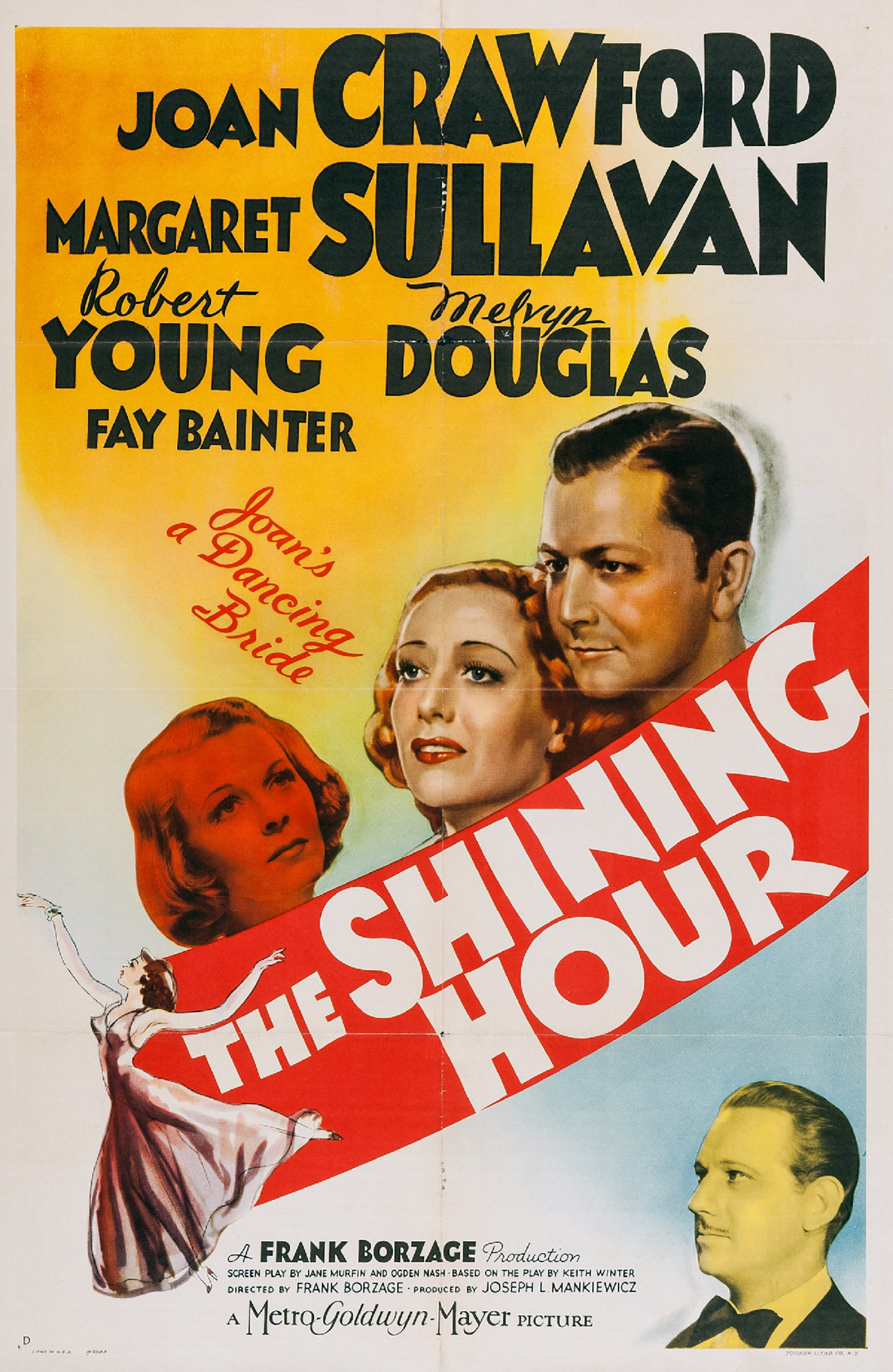
- Original Film Poster
- Directed by: Frank Borzage
- Screenplay by: Jane Murfin; Ogden Nash
- Based on: The Shining Hour; 1934 play by Keith Winter
- Produced by: Joseph L. Mankiewicz; Frank Borzage (uncredited)
- Starring: Joan Crawford; Margaret Sullavan; Robert Young; Melvyn Douglas
- Cinematography: George J. Folsey
- Edited by: Frank E. Hull
- Music by: Franz Waxman
- Production company: Metro-Goldwyn-Mayer
- Distributed by: Loew's Inc
- Release dates: December 7, 1938 (Los Angeles); January 19, 1939 (New York)
- Running time: 76 minutes
- Country: United States
- Language: English
- Budget: $1,068,000
- Box office: $1,367,000

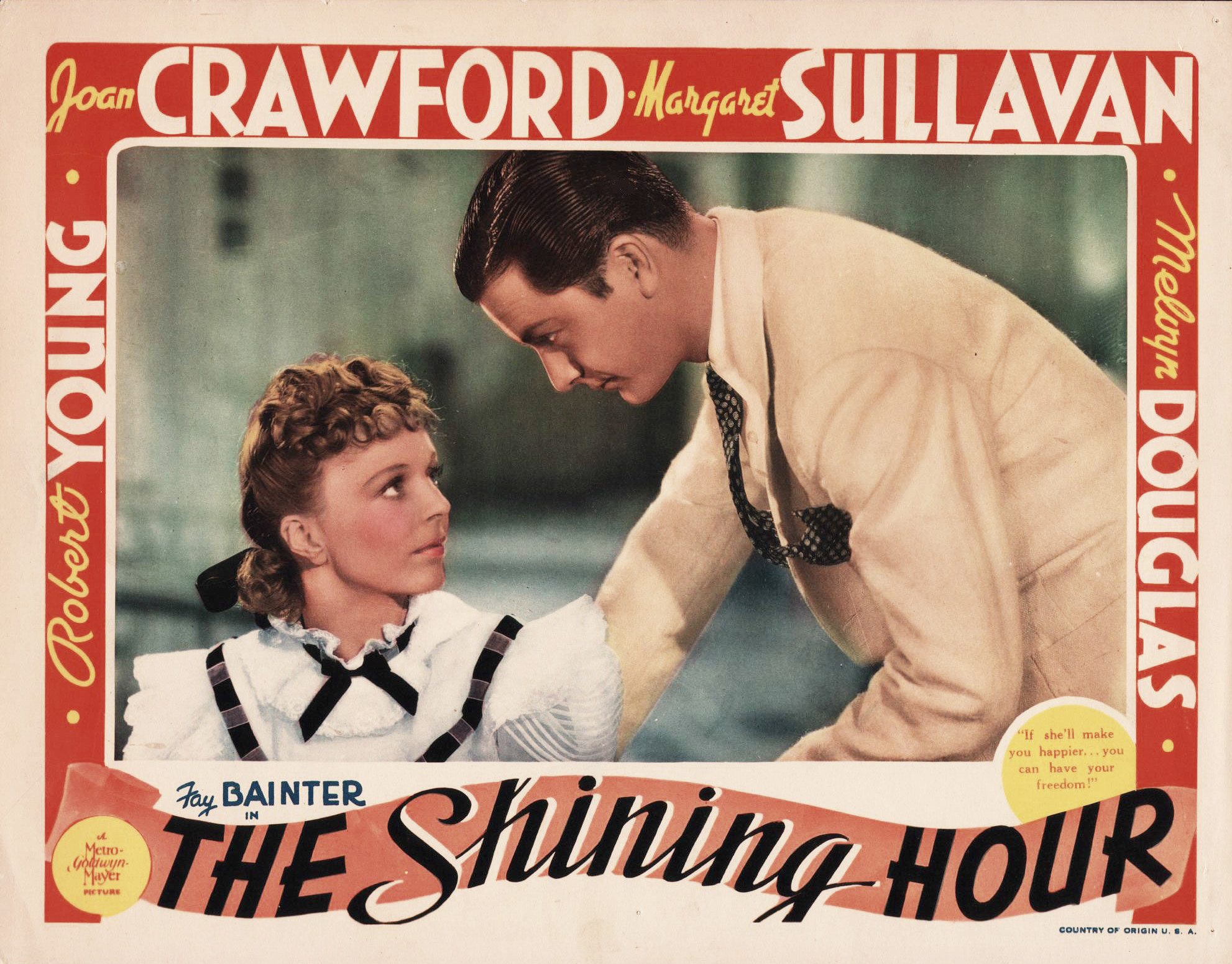
Lobby card with Margaret Sullavan and Robert Young

The Shining Hour is a 1938 American romantic drama film directed by Frank Borzage, based on the 1934 play The Shining Hour by Keith Winter, and starring Joan Crawford and Margaret Sullavan. The supporting cast of the MGM film features Robert Young, Melvyn Douglas, Fay Bainter and Hattie McDaniel.

== Plot ==
Olivia Riley, a very successful New York City nightclub dancer, tires of the fast life and consents to marry Henry Linden, a wealthy farmer from Wisconsin. However, Henry's brother David is sent to New York by their domineering sister Hannah to dissuade him from marrying Olivia. In private, Olivia slaps David when he questions her integrity. She tells a resentful former boyfriend who predicts that she will soon tire of Henry that she will marry Henry because he loves her and because he is the only person in her life who expects the best of her.

When Olivia and Henry move to the family’s farm—a huge estate—in Wisconsin, she immediately encounters trouble from her disapproving sister-in-law Hannah. Hannah engages in constant verbal harassment of Olivia, which only gets worse as time goes on.

David’s repeated apologies to Olivia and changes in his behavior suggest that he is falling for his brother’s wife. Olivia, who has found a friend and ally in David's wife, Judy, forestalls every attempt to get close to her.

Occupied with the building of a beautiful new house for himself and Olivia, Henry remains oblivious to the undercurrents in the family drama. Olivia confides in her maid, Belvedere.

Things come to a head months later when the house is complete. In a quiet moment before the big dance, Olivia tells Judy why she married Henry— because he loved her. Judy admits that she married David because she loved him so deeply.

At the dance, Olivia confronts Hannah, but nothing comes of it.

Olivia has encouraged Danny, a farmhand who wants to play trumpet with a big band, but he gets drunk, blows his chance (pun intended) and assaults Olivia. She decks him with a one-two punch.

David comes upon the scene, sends Danny on his way, and takes the breathless Olivia, who is laughing and weeping at the same time, in his arms. He kisses her. She responds, asks what happens next, and when he has no answer, runs away. David looks for her in the new house and finds Judy there. She wipes his lips thoroughly with her handkerchief, saying it was just a little piece of cigarette paper but suggesting it was Olivia’s lipstick.

Olivia tells Henry she wants to go away for a little while, blaming the encounter with Hannah, among other things. She tells departing guests that she and Henry are going away for 6 months on a delayed Honeymoon. Judy watches David’s reaction. Hannah says under her breath to Henry that if they go away they will never come back, David says to Olivia it won’t be long enough, she declares it will be six years if necessary.

Cut to the office where Henry is preparing for their departure. A furious Hannah confronts him; he declares her hate is driving them away. In the house, Olivia resists David. Judy asks Olivia to go away with David. They are interrupted by the news the new house is on fire. Hannah, who set the fire, tells Henry to let it burn. Judy runs into the flames, but Olivia saves her.

Judy is badly burned but will recover. Olivia helps David realize that he loves his wife. Olivia decides to leave the farm, alone, but telling Henry she loves him. A chastened Hannah tells him to go after her, and he jumps into the passenger seat as Olivia drives away. He tells her they will have to stop to get him some clothes, but from the backseat, her arms full of suitcases, Belvedere tells him she put his bag in the car 20 minutes ago. Olivia and Henry kiss passionately, and Belvedere reaches for the steering wheel.

== Cast ==
- Joan Crawford as Olivia Riley
- Margaret Sullavan as Judy Linden
- Robert Young as David Linden
- Melvyn Douglas as Henry Linden
- Fay Bainter as Hannah Linden
- Allyn Joslyn as Roger Q. Franklin
- Hattie McDaniel as Belvedere
- Oscar O'Shea as Charlie Collins
- Frank Albertson as Benny Collins
- Harry Barris as Bertie
- Tony de Marco as uncredited dancer

== Production ==
After Crawford and Franchot Tone had seen the original play, Crawford asked MGM head Louis B Mayer to consider a film adaptation. Although the studio had planned for Norma Shearer to star in a 1936 version, it ultimately did not come to fruition.

Crawford later asked for both Fay Bainter and Margaret Sullavan to star alongside her in the film. Robert Montgomery was originally cast to play David Linden but was replaced with Robert Young.

Production began on August 22, 1938, finishing on October 3, 1938. Melvyn Douglas later noted that Crawford and Sullavan worked well together on the set.

Gowns and set designs for the film were created by Adrian and Cedric Gibbons.

== Reception ==
In a contemporary review for The New York Times, critic Bosley Crowther called The Shining Hour "a hackneyed story of a definitely inferior grade" and wrote:

As a play, "The Shining Hour" wasn't freighted with reason—and the hysterical mental processes of its characters were generously explained as those of Yorkshire Englishmen. As a film, it is even less credible—and the scene is America! ... Miss Sullavan gives the best performance, managing to capture some poignancy and a touch of hopeless heroism in her self-sacrificial role. ... Miss Crawford wears many gowns—and most becomingly, too—but none of them seem to assist her in giving shape or dimension to a role which (at least) required much elaboration.

Los Angeles Times critic Edwin Schallert wrote:

Miss Crawford gives one of her best performances ... Miss Sullavan's appeal, at times, is overwhelming. ... Frank Borzage's direction is, as always, expressive, but doesn't overcome certain theatrical attributes of the story itself. These are more noticeable as the picture progresses along its somewhat slow-paced way. It is an interesting dramatic offering, however, which will find not only Crawford followers receptive but numerous others.

According to MGM records, the film earned $942,000 in the U.S. and Canada and $425,000 in other markets, realizing for the studio a total box office of $1,367,000. Those receipts, less the production's cited budget of $1,068,000 and distribution costs, resulted in a loss of $137,000 for MGM.
