= Alan Sues =

American actor (1926–2011)

- Born: Alan Grigsby Sues; March 7, 1926; Ross, California, U.S.
- Died: December 1, 2011 (aged 85); West Hollywood, California, U.S.
- Resting place: Forest Lawn Memorial Park (Hollywood Hills)
- Occupations: Actor, comedian
- Years active: 1953–2009
- Spouse: Phyllis Gehrig (m. 1953; div. 1958)

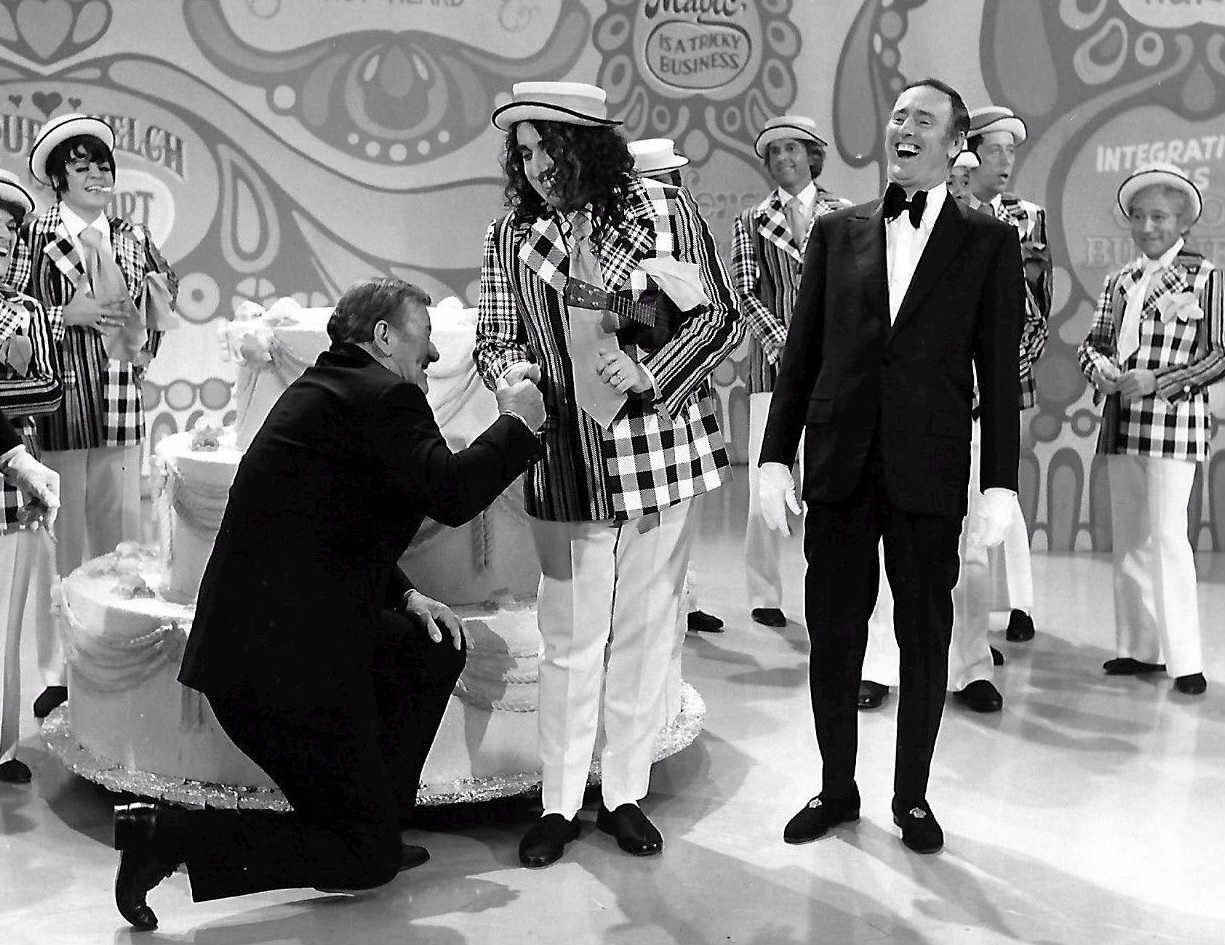
Rowan & Martin's Laugh-In, L > R: Ruth Buzzi, Joanne Worley, John Wayne, Tiny Tim, Alan Sues, Dick Martin, Dennis Roy Allen, and Henry Gibson.

Alan Grigsby Sues (March 7, 1926 – December 1, 2011) was an American actor and comedian best known as a cast member of the 1968–1973 television series Rowan & Martin's Laugh-In.

Sues's on-screen persona was campy and outrageous. Typical of his humor was a skit that found him following a pair of whiskey-drinking cowboys to a Wild West bar and requesting a frozen daiquiri. His recurring characters on the program included "Big Al the Sportscaster", "Uncle Al the Kiddies' Pal", and "Jo Anne Worley", after Worley left the show.

== Early life ==
Alan Grigsby Sues was born on March 7, 1926, in Ross, California, to Alice (née Murray) and Melvyn Sues, who raised racehorses, requiring the family to move frequently. He served in the U.S. Army in Europe during World War II.

== Career ==
Sues used his G.I. Bill benefits to pay for acting lessons at the Pasadena Playhouse, where he performed, later making his Broadway debut in the stage play Tea and Sympathy, directed by Elia Kazan, which had a successful run in New York City beginning in 1953. During this period, he met and married Phyllis Gehrig, a dancer and actress, subsequently starting a vaudevillian nightclub act in Manhattan — with which they toured North America before divorcing in 1958.

After touring the country with his wife, he got more work in stand-up comedy (at Reuben Bleu and The Blue Angel, both clubs in Manhattan), worked with Julius Monk, and joined an improv/sketch group with The Mad Show, which led to his being cast in Laugh-In. Outside of Laugh-In, he appeared in the classic Twilight Zone episode "The Masks", in a non-comedic role. He also had supporting roles in the films Move Over, Darling (1963) and The Americanization of Emily (1964).

After Laugh-In, Sues portrayed Professor Moriarty onstage in Sherlock Holmes (opposite John Wood, and later Leonard Nimoy), which, according to Alan, was "one of my favorite roles, because it's so against type, and I loved the makeup". The makeup for Moriarty was used in several books about makeup as an example of shadowing and technique. Sues appeared in television commercials for Peter Pan Peanut Butter during the 1970s, as a tongue-in-cheek, klutzy Peter Pan. He toured with Singin' in the Rain, playing the Elocution Instructor. He also appeared in several movies and provided voiceovers including Oh! Heavenly Dog, Rudolph and Frosty's Christmas in July and Raggedy Ann & Andy: A Musical Adventure.

During the 1970s, Sues appeared as a celebrity guest on some popular game shows of the era, including The Movie Game, Celebrity Sweepstakes, The Cross-Wits and Liar's Club.

== Later years and death ==
Sues appeared in the short films Lord of the Road (1999) and Artificially Speaking (2009), the latter making its premiere at the 2009 Dances With Films festival in Los Angeles.

In 2008, fifty years after their divorce, Sues and his former wife, Phyllis, conducted a lengthy interview at his home for her website.

Sues died on December 1, 2011, at Cedars-Sinai Medical Center, Los Angeles, where he was taken after suffering an apparent heart attack while watching television with his beloved dog, Doris, according to his partner and accountant, Michael Michaud.

== Stage ==
- Tea and Sympathy (1953–1955) — Ralph
- Happy Birthday (1956)
- The Mad Show (1966–1967) Off-Broadway
- Good News (1972) — Kenley Players (Ohio)
- The Adventures of Sherlock Holmes (1974–1976) — Professor Moriarty
- The Three Musketeers (1976)
- Singin' in the Rain (national tour 1995–1999) — Director/elocutionist
- Two for the Show (1998–2000) — One-man stage show, multiple characters

== Filmography ==
=== Films ===
- Move Over, Darling (1963) — Court Clerk
- The Wheeler Dealers (1963) - Whitby
- The Americanization of Emily (1964) — Officer Enright
- Raggedy Ann and Andy: A Musical Adventure (1977) — Sir Leonard Looney (voice)
- Oh! Heavenly Dog (1980) — Freddie
- The Reluctant Dragon (1981) — The Dragon (voice)
- Snowballing (AKA Smooth Moves) (1984) — Roy
- A Bucket of Blood (1995) — Art Buyer
- Lord of the Road (1999)
- Artificially Speaking (2009) — Sparky Schlosser

=== Television ===
- The Twilight Zone (episode: "The Masks"; 1964) — Wilfred Harper, Jr.
- The Wild Wild West (1965) — Matt Dawson
- The Doris Day Show (episode: "The Relatives;" 1968) - Edgar
- Rowan & Martin's Laugh-In (1968–1972) — Regular performer
- Rudolph and Frosty's Christmas in July (1979) — Scratcher the jealous Reindeer (voice)
- Gridlock (1980 TV film) — Dudley
- The Brady Brides (episode: "Cool Hand Phil"; 1981) — Duke
- Punky Brewster (episode: "Tangled Web"; 1987) — Andre Sockstein
- Sabrina, the Teenage Witch (episode: "Good Will Haunting"; 1998) — Bellevuedere

Sues also appeared in two episodes of "Love, American Style".
