= Artificially Speaking =

- Directed by: Todd Lampe
- Written by: Bob Favarato; Todd Lampe
- Produced by: Bob Favarato; Todd Lampe
- Starring: Alan Sues; Lou Wagner; Stephanie Silverman; Karen Rambo
- Cinematography: Todd Lampe
- Edited by: Todd Lampe
- Music by: Todd Lampe
- Production company: Precipice Productions
- Distributed by: Precipice Productions
- Release date: June 6, 2009
- Running time: 18 minutes
- Country: United States
- Language: English

Artificially Speaking is a short film, which premiered at Dances with Films 2009 at the Laemmle Sunset 5, June 6, 2009. It stars Alan Sues, Lou Wagner, Karen Rambo, and an assorted cast.

== Premise ==
Where does artificial fruit flavoring come from? Artificial fruit, of course. Holly Hockenberry owns an artificial fruit farm, maintained by overworked gardener Sparky Schlosser. The farm is caught in the middle of a scandal regarding a case of tainted artificial fruit. Some questionable companies may be involved in a massive cover-up, which has caused the farm's profit to plummet.

== Cast ==
- Alan Sues as Sparky Schlosser
- Karen Rambo as Holly Hockenberry
- Stephanie Silverman as Sandy Steinn
- Lou Wagner as Dr. Lionel Bainbridge
- Mike Ciccolini as Warehouse Guy #1
- Frank Walton as Warehouse Guy #2
- Joe Basile as Phil Scuzzola
- Jason Rockney as JJ Ichuta
- Terry Thistelwaite as Documentarian
- Artificial Fruit as The Innocent Victim
