= Adrianne Allen =

English actress (1907–1993)

- Photo by Dorothy Wilding, 1939
- Born: 7 February 1907; Manchester, Lancashire, England
- Died: 14 September 1993 (aged 86); Montreux, Switzerland
- Occupation: Actress
- Spouses: Raymond Massey (m. 1929; div. 1939) William Whitney (m. 1939; died 1973)
- Children: Daniel Massey; Anna Massey

Adrianne Allen (7 February 1907 – 14 September 1993) was an English stage actress.

Most often seen in light comedy, Allen played Sybil Chase in the original West End production of Private Lives and Elizabeth Bennet in the 1935 Broadway production of Pride and Prejudice. She appeared in several films and was the mother of actors Daniel and Anna Massey.

== Life and career ==
Allen was born in Manchester on 7 February 1907 to John and Margaret Allen. After her education in France and Germany, she trained as an actress at the Royal Academy of Dramatic Art, where her 1926 graduation performance caught the attention of Basil Dean, who cast her as Nina Vansittart in the Noël Coward play Easy Virtue, when it arrived to London from Broadway.

In 1929, she married Raymond Massey, after he had cast her for a part in Noël Coward's play The Rat Trap. Her first West End appearance followed in July 1930, where she played the role of Sibyl in Noël Coward's Private Lives. She had two children with Raymond Massey, Daniel and Anna, who later became actors. The marriage ended in divorce in 1939. Shortly after her divorce she married William Dwight Whitney, the lawyer who had handled the divorce. (Raymond Massey also married the lawyer who had represented him in the divorce case, Dorothy Whitney.)

During this time she appeared on Broadway, in Cynara, and as Judy Linden in The Shining Hour, and in several films, most notably Merrily We Go to Hell. In 1942, she played "Doris" in the original London production of Terence Rattigan's play Flare Path.

She starred in more films, and appeared on British television, before returning to Broadway in 1957, where she starred alongside her daughter in The Reluctant Debutante. Her acting career ended in 1958.

== Death ==
Allen died from cancer on 14 September 1993 in Montreux, Switzerland.

== Selected Broadway and West End roles ==
- Cynara (1931) as Doris Lea
- The Shining Hour (1934) as Judy Linden
- Pride and Prejudice (1935) as Elizabeth Bennet
- Flare Path (1942) as Doris, Countess Skriczevinsky
- Love for Love (1947) as Mrs. Frail
- Edward, My Son (1948) as Evelyn Holt
- Someone Waiting (1953) as Vera
- The Reluctant Debutante (1956) as Sheila Broadbent

== Filmography ==
- Loose Ends (1930)
- The Stronger Sex (1931)
- The Woman Between (1931)
- Black Coffee (1931)
- Merrily We Go to Hell (1932)
- The Night of June 13 (1932)
- The Morals of Marcus (1935)
- The October Man (1947)
- Bond Street (1948)
- Vote for Huggett (1949)
- The Final Test (1953)
- Meet Mr. Malcolm (1954)
