= Frank Castle (author) =

American author (born 1910)

Frank Pulliam Castle
- Born: May 8, 1910; Stanley, New Mexico
- Died: September 18, 1994 (aged 84); Lebanon, Oregon
- Occupation: Author
- Writing career
- Genres: western fiction, crime fiction

Frank Pulliam Castle was an American author of western and crime fiction. He wrote as Frank Castle, Frank P. Castle, and under the pseudonyms Steve Thurman, Val Munroe, Cole Fannin, Jack Slade, and Helen B. Castle.

== Biography ==
Castle was born May 8, 1910, in Stanley, New Mexico, one of four children of Wilbur and Ruby (Pulliam) Castle. When he was nine, the family moved to Southern California, where he grew up. He attended San Fernando High School and the University of Oklahoma, majoring in journalism, after which he served in the U.S. Navy from 1940 to 1946. Following his service, he returned to Southern California. He married Helen Louise (Garratt) Bevillard June 26, 1946 in El Sereno, California. She was born November 21, 1915, in Racine County, Wisconsin, daughter of Arthur Earnest and Anna Loiuse (Tange) Garratt. She had previously been married to Arthur Nestor Bevillard. Helen was a nurse, and Frank would later write a couple of nurse romances under her name. She died December 26, 1986, in Los Angeles, California. In 1988 he moved to Lebanon, Oregon, where his two living siblings resided. He died September 18, 1994, at the Villa Cascade Care Center in Lebanon, Oregon.

== Literary career ==
From the late 1940s onward, Castle made his living as a writer of western and crime fiction, first for pulp fiction magazines and then, beginning in the early 1950s, as a novelist. He branched out into movie and television tie-ins, mostly for younger readers, historical fiction and romance. In addition to his own name, he used a number of pen names in his writing, principally Steve Thurman, but also Cole Fannin for his juveniles, and his wife's name Helen B. Castle for his nurse romances. His contributions to Belmont/Tower's Lassiter series of Westerns appeared under the house name Jack Slade, and he employed Val Munroe for soft porn. His writing career wound down in the early 1970s. One of his late crime novels did not find an American publisher, and only appeared in Finland, in Finnish translation.

Castle's short fiction appeared in Ace-High Western Stories, Best Western, Big-Book Western Magazine, Complete Western Book Magazine, Exciting Western, Fifteen Western Tales, Fighting Western, .44 Western Magazine, Frontier Stories, Leading Western, Mammoth Western Quarterly, Mammoth Western, The Man, New Western Magazine, New Western Magazine (Canada), New Western Magazine (UK), The Pecos Kid Western, Ranch Romances, Rangeland Romances, The Rio Kid Western, Star Western, 10 Story Western Magazine, Texas Rangers (UK), Three Western Novels Magazine, Thrilling Ranch Stories, Thrilling Ranch Stories (UK), Thrilling Western, Thrilling Western (UK), Top Western Fiction Annual, Triple Western, 2-Gun Western, Two Western Books, West, Western Ace High Stories, Western Aces, Western Love Romances, Western Novel and Short Stories, Western Novels (UK), Western Rodeo Romances, Western Short Stories, Western Story (UK), and Western Story Magazine.

== Bibliography ==
=== Western novels ===
- Move Along, Stranger (Fawcett Gold Medal, Jan. 1954 or 1952)
- Border Buccaneers (Ace, 1955)
- Gun Lightning! (Graphic, 1955) (as by Steve Thurman)
- Gun Talk at Yuma (Fawcett Gold Medal, 1957)
- Vengeance Under Law (Fawcett Gold Medal, 1957)
- Dakota Boomtown (Fawcett Gold Medal, 1958)
- Fort Desperation (Fawcett Gold Medal, 1958)
- Blood Moon (Fawcett Gold Medal, 1960)
- Guns to Sonora (Berkley, 1962)
- King of the Frontier (Berkley Medallion, 1965)
- The Hungry Gun (Paperback Library, 1966) (as by Steve Thurman)
- Brand of Hate (Tower, 1966)
- Escape from Yuma (Tower, 1969)
- Lobo (Belmont/Tower, 1969)

==== Lassiter series (as Jack Slade) ====
- Sidewinder (Tower, 1968 [sic; 1969]) (Lassiter #7)
- The Badlanders (Belmont/Tower, 1973) (Lassiter #14)
- Hell at Yuma (Belmont/Tower, 1974) (Lassiter #15)
- Ride Into Hell (Belmont/Tower, 1974) (Lassiter #16)
- Blood River (Belmont/Tower, 1974) (Lassiter #17)

=== Crime and suspense novels ===
- The Violent Hours (Fawcett Gold Medal, Feb. 1956)
- Dead - and Kicking (Fawcett Gold Medal, 1956)
- Lovely and Lethal (Fawcett Gold Medal, 1957)
- Murder in Red (Fawcett Gold Medal, 1957)
- Night After Night (Monarch Books, 1959) (as Steve Thurman)
- Sanitarium of Tears (Gold Star Books, 1964) (as Steve Thurman)
- Wild in the Night (Pyramid 1969)
- The Sowers of the Doom (1971) (Finnish only, as Tuhon kylväjät)

=== True crime ===
- "Baby Face" Nelson (Monarch Books, 1961) (as Steve Thurman)

=== Romance novels (as Helen B. Castle) ===
- Ivy Anders, Night Nurse (Paperback Library, 1963)
- Emergency Ward Nurse (Paperback Library, 1966)

=== Historical novels ===
- Nero (Avon, 1961)

=== Novelizations ===
- Tarzan and the Lost Safari (Whitman Publishing Company, 1957) (uncredited)
- "Mad Dog" Coll (Monarch, 1961) (as Steve Thurman)
- Hawaiian Eye (Dell, 1962)

=== Television tie-ins (as Cole Fannin) ===
- Gene Autry and the Golden Stallion (Whitman Publishing Company, 1954)
- Roy Rogers and the Brasada Bandits (Whitman Publishing Company, 1955)
- Roy Rogers, King of the Cowboys (Whitman Publishing Company, 1956)
- Roy Rogers and Dale Evans in River of Peril (Whitman Publishing Company, 1957)
- Rin Tin Tin and the Ghost Wagon Train (Whitman Publishing Company, 1958)
- Sea Hunt (Whitman Publishing Company, 1958)
- The Rifleman (Whitman Publishing Company, 1959)
- The Real McCoys: Danger at the Ranch (Whitman Publishing Company, 1961)
- Leave it to Beaver (Whitman Publishing Company, 1962)
- Lucy and the Madcap Mystery (Whitman Publishing Company, 1963)

=== Soft porn novels (as Val Munroe) ===
- Carnival of Passion (Rainbow Books, 1952; reissued as Lisette (Beacon Books, 1962))
- Tender Hearted Harlot (Rainbow Books, 1952)
- After Hours (Beacon Books, 1961)
- Sex Fever (Beacon Books, 1965)
- The Naked View (Beacon Books, 1966)
- Second-Year Intern (Beacon Books, 1966)
- Doctors & Wives (Award Books, 1968)

=== Short fiction ===
- "B. Perrin, Proprietor" (Ranch Romances, Sep #1 1949)
- "Bad Year, Bad Time" (Ranch Romances, Sep #3 1954)
- "Beef, Bullets—and a Blonde" (10 Story Western Magazine, Oct 1950)
- "Beware That Yankee Lass!" (Mammoth Western, May 1949)
- "Beware the Side-Winder Breed!" (Complete Western Book Magazine, Feb 1950)
- "Blizzard Fugitive" (Big-Book Western Magazine, Sep 1952; The Man, Oct 1955)
- "Blow, Devil Wind!" (Big-Book Western Magazine, Jul 1952; Big-Book Western Magazine (UK) #15, 1953)
- "Born Bad" (New Western Magazine, Jul 1951; New Western Magazine (Canada), Jul 1951)
- "Brasada Quest" (Western Novels and Short Stories, Dec 1952; Western Novels (UK) v1 #2 195?)
- "Brothers in Blood" (Triple Western Dec 1952, Top Western Fiction Annual v3 #2 1957)
- "Burned-Out Range" (Ranch Romances, Nov #2 1949)
- "Calamity Canyon" (Thrilling Ranch Stories, Sum 1952; Ranch Romances, Feb #1 1958
- "The Cautious Ramrod" (Ranch Romances, Jul #2 1954)
- "Choring for Board" (Ranch Romances, Sep #3 1952)
- "Code of the Buckskin Breed" (10 Story Western Magazine, Mar 1950; 10 Story Western Magazine (UK) #3, 1950)
- "Command of the Damned" (Big-Book Western Magazine, Dec 1949)
- "Coyote's Stooge" (10 Story Western Magazine, Jan 1951)
- ""Crawfish, Dude, or Drag Iron!"" (Western Short Stories, Sep 1949)
- "Curse of the Lost Trevinos" (Ace-High Western Stories, Nov 1949)
- "Cute 'n Caressable" (Western Love Romances, Feb 1950)
- "Death Be My Judge" (Western Ace High Stories, Apr 1954)
- "The Death Dealer" (Fifteen Western Tales, Aug 1955)
- "Death Rides Close" (Star Western, Jun 1954)
- "Destiny at Devil's Hole" (Ranch Romances, Mar #2 1953)
- "Duty Rider" (Western Rodeo Romances, Spr 1951)
- "The Faceless Dead" (The Rio Kid Western, May 1952) (as Steve Thurman)
- "Firewater Feud" (.44 Western Magazine, Aug 1950)
- "Girl Behind a Star" (Fighting Western, Aug 1949)
- "Girl on His Mind, Gun in His Hand" (Western Short Stories, Jan 1954)
- "A Gray Beard Buys In with Bullets" (Western Novels and Short Stories, Jan 1950; 2-Gun Western, Aug 1955; Western Novels and Short Stories (UK) #3, 195?)
- "Gun Fight" (Thrilling Western, Jul 1951; Top Western Fiction Annual v3 #1, 1956; Thrilling Western (UK), Jan 1956)
- "Gun Shy" (Western Ace High Stories, Feb 1954)
- "Gun-Hawk from El Paso" (Frontier Stories, Sum 1952)
- "Gunman's Choice" (Ranch Romances, Aug #1 1954)
- "Gunsmoke Crossing" (Ranch Romances, May #2 1949)
- "Gunsmoke Graze" (West, Nov 1952)
- "He Was at Grand Basin" (Western Novel and Short Stories, Jan 1955)
- "He Wore a Gun His Wedding Night" (2-Gun Western, Nov 1954)
- "Her Wild Brother" (Western Short Stories, Jun 1954)
- "Hideout for Hoodoo" (Frontier Stories, Spr 1951)
- "High Country Manhunt" (Ranch Romances, Apr #3 1954)
- "Hot Lead Legend" (Ace-High Western Stories, Jan 1950)
- "Husband for a Redhead" (Ranch Romances, Sep #1 1953)
- "Kid Lawhawk" (Western Aces, Mar 1949)
- "A Killer Will Come Out of Texas" (Western Short Stories, Mar 1952; Western Novels (UK), v1 #1, 195?)
- "The Last Gun-Wolf" (The Pecos Kid Western, Jan 1951)
- "Loco Like a Texan" (Western Short Stories, Aug 1952)
- "A Man's Job" (Ranch Romances, Jan #2 1951; Thrilling Ranch Stories (UK), Jun 1952)
- "Minx in the Moonlight" (Rangeland Romances, Jan 1951)
- "Mule Train from Ajo" (Ranch Romances, Oct #1 1953)
- "Night in San Marcos" (Texas Rangers, Feb 1953)
- "No Grass Is Free" (Triple Western, Aug 1952)
- "Nobody Wins a Range War!" (Western Novels and Short Stories, May 1950)
- "Once a Ramrod" (Triple Western, Feb 1952)
- "One Against the Lynch-Mob" (Exciting Western, Jan 1952)
- "One Hell of a Blonde" (Star Western, Jun 1953; Western Story Magazine (UK), Oct 1953)
- "One Night in Laramie" (Ranch Romances, Apr #2 1954)
- "One-Man Woman" (Star Western, Aug 1951)
- "Outcasts of Bitter Wells" (.44 Western Magazine, Dec 1949)
- "Outlaw" (Complete Western Book Magazine, Feb 1952)
- "The Outlaw Takes a Blonde" (Star Western, Oct 1953)
- "Owlhoot Gal" (Star Western, Aug 1953; Western Story Magazine (UK), Dec 1953)
- "Plew-Hunters for Perdition's Frontier!" (.44 Western Magazine, Jun 1950)
- "Powdersmoke Parole" (Western Short Stories, Nov 1949; 2-Gun Western, Aug 1956)
- "Powdersmoke Party" (Leading Western, Apr 1950)
- "Queen of Satan's Crew" (Big-Book Western Magazine, Sep 1951)
- "Queen of the Wild River" (Mammoth Western, Dec 1950; Mammoth Western Quarterly, Spr 1951)
- "Range Bum" (Western Novels and Short Stories, Jun 1951)
- "Rider from the Past" (Complete Western Book Magazine, May 1952)
- "Riders of the Rio Moon" (Two Western Books, Spr 1954)
- "Rope Enough" (New Western Magazine, Jun 1950; New Western Magazine (UK), 195?)
- "Saddlepards—Until Guns Show!" (Western Short Stories Jun 1949)
- "The Scarlet Sign" (Star Western, Aug 1952; Western Story (UK), Dec 1957)
- "Second Chance Sixes" (Fifteen Western Tales, Nov 1950)
- "The Sixgun in His Saddle-Roll" (Complete Western Book Magazine, Aug 1952)
- "Someone to Side a Man" (Ranch Romances, Dec #1 1950; Thrilling Ranch Stories (UK), Feb 1953)
- "Summer Puncher" (Ranch Romances, Sep #2 1954)
- "Take That Grass" (Ranch Romances, Dec #2 1952)
- "Talking Cowboy" (Ranch Romances, May #1 1951)
- "Tell It to the Texans!" (Best Western, Dec 1951)
- "Texans Die Hard" (Triple Western, Spr 1954)
- "Time to Kill" (Fifteen Western Tales, Jul 1954)
- "Tough Road to Texas" (Thrilling Ranch Stories, Fall 1953)
- "Tough Town" (Complete Western Book Magazine, Aug 1950)
- "Trail of the Seven Dead" (Fifteen Western Tales, Feb 1955; Western Story (UK), May 1955)
- "Water Brings War" (Thrilling Ranch Stories, Sum 1950; Thrilling Ranch Stories (UK), Feb 1951)
- "'We're Packing Irons This Time, Circle H!'" (Western Short Stories, Oct 1952)
- "When Hell Hit Tascadero" (.44 Western Magazine, Sep 1952)
- "Whiphand of the Wild Bunch" (Three Western Novels Magazine, Oct 1949)
- "Widow of the Brush" (Ranch Romances, Jun #1 1952)
- "Wild Night in Dodge" (Texas Rangers, Dec 1954; Thrilling Western (UK), Mar 1956)
- "With Savvy or a Sixgun?" (Best Western, Mar 1952)
