= The Masks =

- The Twilight Zone episode
- Episode no.: Season 5 Episode 25
- Directed by: Ida Lupino
- Written by: Rod Serling
- Production code: 2601
- Original air date: March 20, 1964

Guest appearances
- Robert Keith; Milton Selzer; Virginia Gregg; Brooke Hayward; Alan Sues; Willis Bouchey; Bill Walker; Maidie Norman

Episode chronology
← Previous "What's in the Box"	Next → "I Am the Night—Color Me Black"
- The Twilight Zone (1959 TV series) (season 5)

"The Masks" is episode 145 of the American television series The Twilight Zone. It originally aired on March 20, 1964 on CBS. In this episode, set on Mardi Gras, a dying man coerces his relatives into wearing grotesque masks that reflect their true personalities.

== Opening narration ==
Mr. Jason Foster, a tired ancient who on this particular Mardi Gras evening will leave the Earth. But before departing he has some things to do: some services to perform, some debts to pay, and some justice to mete out. This is New Orleans, Mardi Gras time. It is also The Twilight Zone.

== Plot ==
On the night of Mardi Gras, wealthy Jason Foster is attended to by his physician, Dr. Samuel Thorne, who warns him that his death is imminent. Cranky and candid, Jason is not cheered by the arrival from Boston of his cowardly hypochondriac daughter, Emily Harper, and her family: greedy businessman husband Wilfred; oafish, sadistic grandson Wilfred Jr.; and vain, unsympathetic granddaughter Paula.

After openly insulting the Harpers, Foster says he has a special Mardi Gras party planned for them. Following dinner, the family gathers in Foster's study, where he instructs them to put on special one-of-a-kind masks that he says were "crafted by an old Cajun." Explaining that an old Mardi Gras custom involves wearing a mask that is the opposite of one's true personality, Foster sarcastically gives a sniveling coward mask to Emily, a porcine-featured miser to Wilfred, a brutish buffoon to Wilfred Jr., and a narcissist to Paula while he dons a skull mask, saying that it represents death as opposed to his inherent vivacity. The Harpers initially refuse to participate until Foster correctly accuses them of only being there to claim his fortune upon his death. He then informs them that the terms of his will require them to wear the masks until midnight in order to inherit his estate; if any of them unmasks before then, all four will receive only their return train fare to Boston.

The Harpers reluctantly concede, but as the hours pass, they beg to remove their masks, saying that they are unbearable. However, Foster delivers a final tirade, calling them all caricatures before dying as the clock strikes midnight. The Harpers rejoice in their newly inherited wealth and unmask, but discover to their horror, that their faces now conform to the hideous features of their masks. Foster's face, on the other hand, proves to be superficially unchanged. Dr. Thorne observes, "This must be death. No horror, no fear, nothing but peace."

== Closing narration ==
Mardi Gras incident, the dramatis personae being four people who came to celebrate and, in a sense, let themselves go. This they did with a vengeance. They now wear the faces of all that was inside them – and they'll wear them for the rest of their lives, said lives now to be spent in the shadow. Tonight's tale of men, the macabre and masks on The Twilight Zone.

== Cast ==
- Robert Keith as Jason Foster
- Milton Selzer as Wilfred Harper
- Virginia Gregg as Emily Harper
- Brooke Hayward as Paula Harper
- Alan Sues as Wilfred Harper Jr.
- Willis Bouchey as Dr. Samuel Thorne
- Bill Walker as Jeffrey The Butler
- Maidie Norman as Maid
- Rod Serling as Host / Narrator – Himself

== Episode notes ==
Ida Lupino, who appeared in the season one episode The Sixteen-Millimeter Shrine, directed the episode; she was the only woman to direct an episode of The Twilight Zone.

== Works cited ==
- Grebey, James (April 16, 2025). "The Only Woman to Direct an Episode of the Twilight Zone Was Also the Only Actor to Do So". Syfy. Archived from the original on April 17, 2025.
