= Leland Hayward =

American theatre agent and producer (1902–1971)

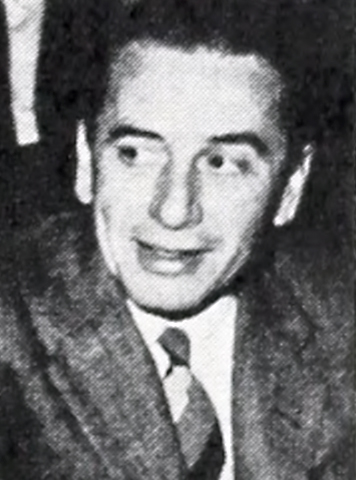
- Hayward in 1942
- Born: William Leland Hayward; September 13, 1902; Nebraska City, Nebraska, U.S.
- Died: March 18, 1971 (aged 68); Yorktown Heights, New York, U.S.
- Occupations: Agent, producer
- Spouses: Inez "Lola" Gibbs (m. 1921; div. 1924) (m. 1930; div. 1934) Margaret Sullavan (m. 1936; div. 1947) Slim Hawks (m. 1949; div. 1960) Pamela Harriman (m. 1960)
- Children: 3, including Brooke Hayward
- Father: William Hayward
- Relatives: Monroe Leland Hayward; Descendants of Robert Coe

William Leland Hayward (September 13, 1902 – March 18, 1971) was an American talent agent and theatrical producer. He was an agent to about 150 artists in Hollywood, and produced the original Broadway stage productions of Rodgers and Hammerstein's South Pacific and The Sound of Music.

== Life and career ==
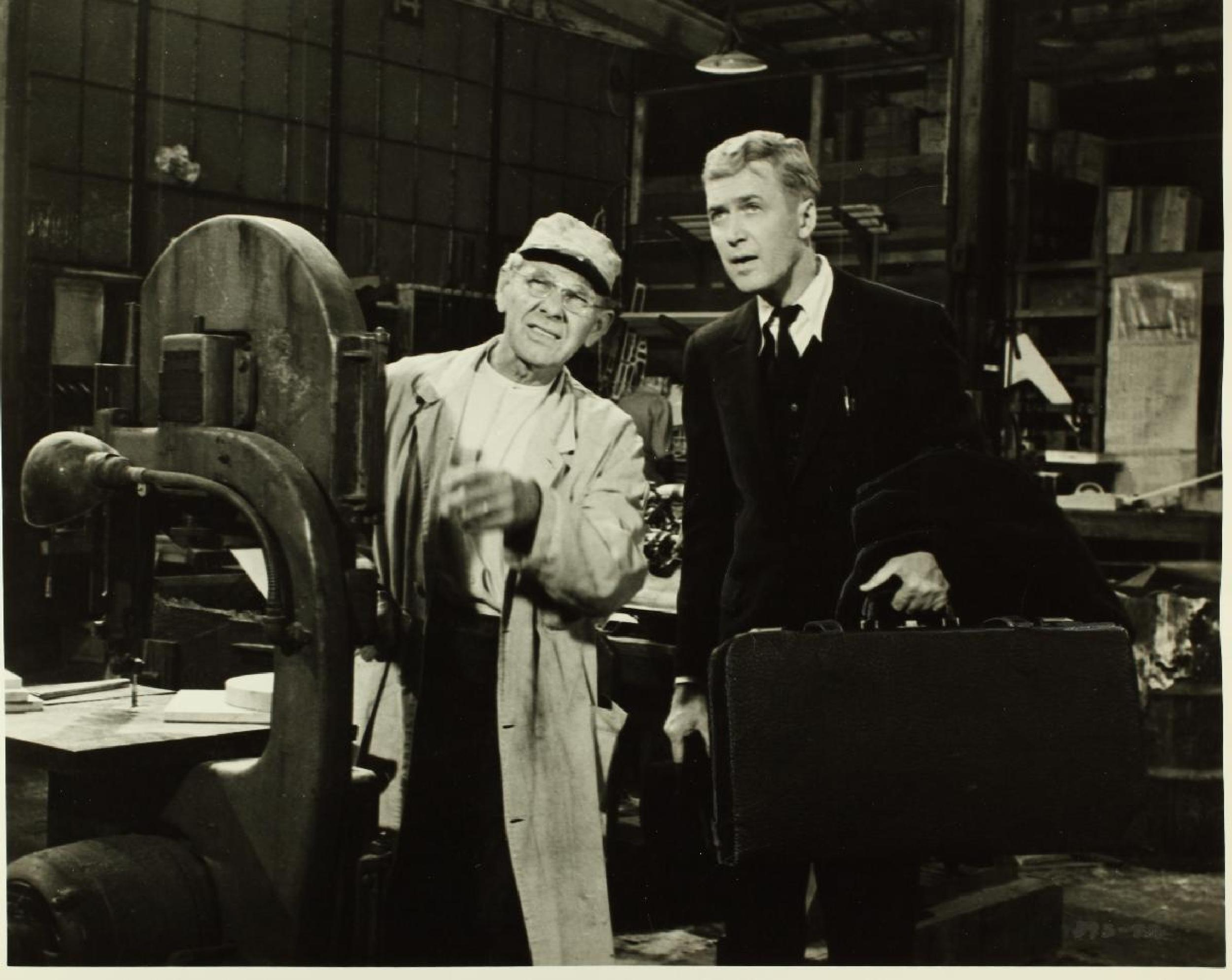
Leland Hayward (left) with Jimmy Stewart in 1955

William Leland Hayward was born in Nebraska City, Nebraska, the grandson of Monroe Leland Hayward, a United States senator from Nebraska. His father, Colonel William Hayward, was a celebrated hero of the First World War who commanded the 369th Infantry Regiment, the "Harlem Hellfighters". Hayward's father and mother, Sarah Coe Ireland, divorced when he was nine. Hayward's father subsequently remarried, to Maisie Manwaring Plant, one of the wealthiest women in America at the time, who later traded her Fifth Avenue mansion to Cartier for a perfectly matched strand of pearls.

Hayward attended The Hotchkiss School and then studied at Princeton University, but dropped out. He took on a number of jobs including newspaper reporter and press agent, but eventually became a talent agent in Hollywood. In the early 1940s, he handled about 150 artists, including Fred Astaire who had been his first client, James Stewart, Ernest Hemingway, Boris Karloff, Judy Garland, Ginger Rogers, as well as the two former husbands of his second wife Margaret Sullavan, Henry Fonda and William Wyler. He dated some of his female clients, including Greta Garbo and Katharine Hepburn. Hepburn refused to marry him, despite a three-year relationship, choosing instead to focus on her career.

In 1945, Hayward sold his talent agency and became a producer. His 1949 production of South Pacific was a great success. He produced both the 1948 play Mister Roberts and the 1955 film version.

Other noteworthy film productions included The Spirit of St. Louis (1957), and The Old Man and the Sea (1958). He was a co-producer (with David Merrick) of the 1959 show Gypsy. His biggest success, however, was The Sound of Music that opened the same year.

Hayward's forays into television were similarly notable. He produced The Ford 50th Anniversary Show on June 15, 1953, a live two-hour simulcast on CBS and NBC that looked back on the history of the United States and the world up to 1953. The program featured a memorable extended duet by Ethel Merman and Mary Martin. In 1953, Hayward conceived Producers' Showcase (1954–1956), a series of 90-minute color spectaculars to be broadcast monthly on NBC. Illness forced Hayward to withdraw from the project shortly before the first broadcast, and production was assumed by his attorneys, Saul and Henry Jaffe. Hayward later produced That Was The Week That Was, a groundbreaking American adaptation of a British television show, from 1963–1965.

Hayward's interest in aviation led to his co-founding, in 1941, Southwest Airways, with financial help from his Hollywood friends.

Hayward was an eccentric in his food habits. He ate only white foods such as potatoes, chicken hash, lamb chops, eggs, custard and vanilla ice cream.

After suffering several strokes, Hayward died at his home, Haywire, in Yorktown Heights, New York, on March 18, 1971.

== Marriages and family ==
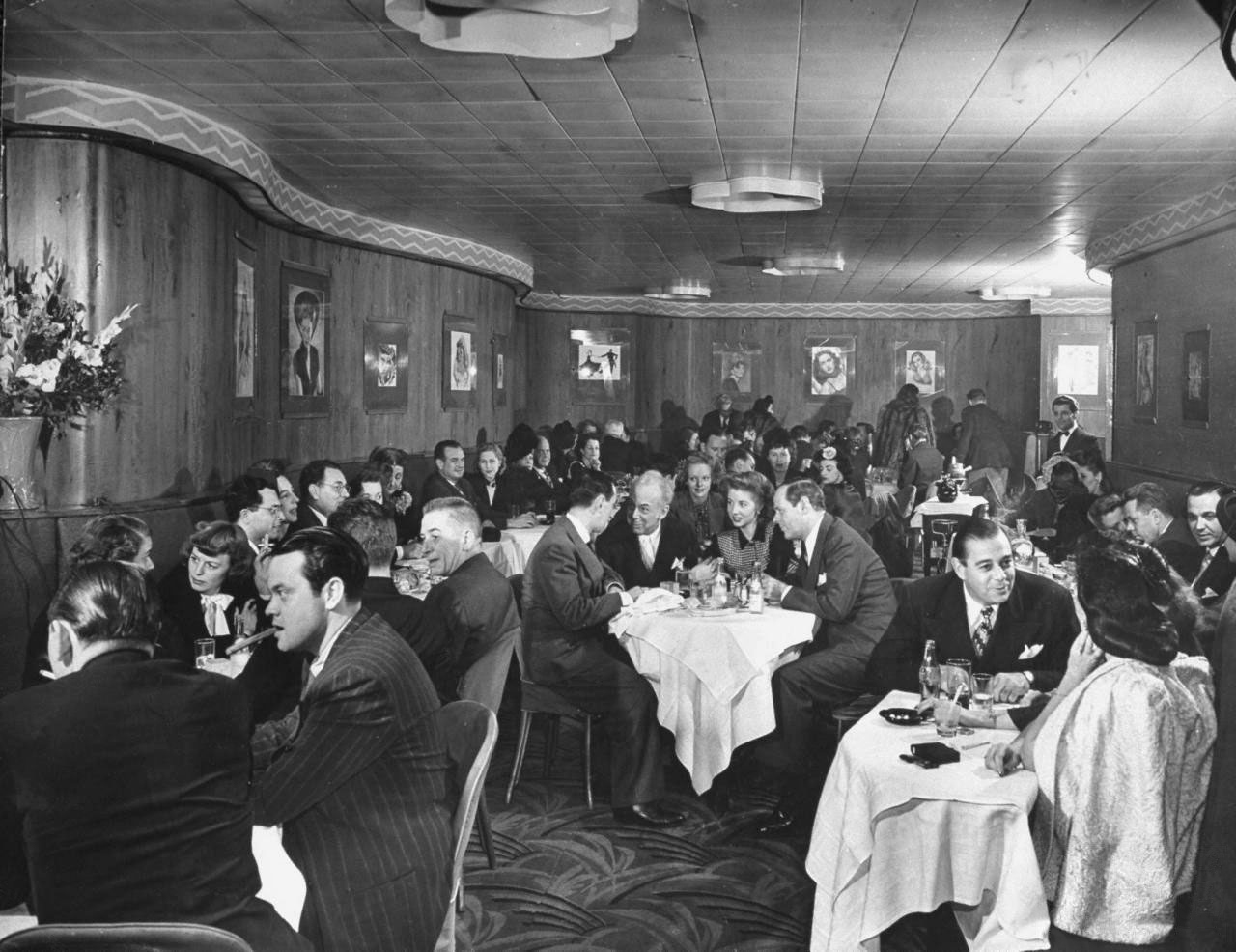
Margaret Sullavan and Leland Hayward among the patrons of the Stork Club in New York City (November 1944)

Hayward was married five times.

1. In 1921, aged 19, Hayward married the debutante Inez "Lola" Gibbs in Greenwich, Connecticut. She was the granddaughter of Texas lieutenant governor Barnett Gibbs. They divorced two years later, after which she married Frederic G. Sayles Jr., whom she divorced in 1928. She and Hayward married again on February 14, 1930, in Dallas, Texas. They had no children.
2. On November 15, 1936, in Newport, Rhode Island, Hayward married the stage and screen actress Margaret Sullavan, who was pregnant with his child. He thus became the third of Sullavan's four husbands. Her previous husbands had been Henry Fonda and William Wyler, and after being divorced from Hayward in 1948, she would go on to marry British investment banker Kenneth Wagg. Hayward and Sullavan had three children, two of whom died by suicide. Margaret Sullavan herself died of an overdose of barbiturates in 1960. Their children were:
  - Brooke Hayward, born July 5, 1937. She married three times, first to writer Michael Thomas and second to actor Dennis Hopper (1961–69). Her third marriage was to Peter Duchin in 1985. Her 1977 memoir, Haywire, recounts in detail the family's dysfunctional life. Her children were:
    - William Thomas
    - Jeffrey Thomas
    - Marin Brooke Hopper
  - Bridget Hayward (1939–1960 ), who died by suicide in her New York apartment from a barbiturate overdose on October 17, 1960, aged 21, less than 10 months after her mother's death from an overdose of sleeping pills, and only a few months after her father's fourth marriage.
  - William Hayward III, born 1941, who committed suicide on March 20, 2008, by shooting himself in the heart. By his marriage to Rita Marie Rosate, he had two children:
    - Leland William Hayward
    - Bridget Pamela Hayward
3. In 1950,Hayward married Slim Hawks. He had met her in Havana at a time when she was legally married to film director Howard Hawks but was staying with writer Ernest Hemingway and his latest wife Mary. Among her other previous relationships had been one with Clark Gable. Hayward and Slim divorced their respective spouses by 1949 and were married the following year; they had already been living together for some time. The marriage became strained after Slim had a one-night stand with Frank Sinatra and a longer affair with Peter Viertel. They were divorced in 1960.
4. In 1960, Hayward married Pamela Churchill, former wife of Randolph Churchill. The couple was wed on 4 May 1960, in Carson City, Nevada, only hours after Hayward's divorce from Hawks was final. They remained nominally married until Hayward's death in 1971, but on the very day of his funeral, Pamela renewed her relationship with a former lover, W. Averell Harriman, and she married him later the same year.

In her 1977 memoir, Haywire, Hayward's daughter Brooke recounts in detail the family's thoroughly dysfunctional dynamics.
