= Margaret Sullavan =

American actress (1909–1960)

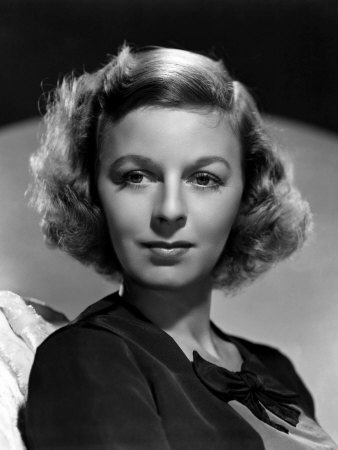
- Sullavan in 1940
- Born: Margaret Brooke Sullavan; May 16, 1909; Norfolk, Virginia, U.S.
- Died: January 1, 1960 (aged 50); New Haven, Connecticut, U.S.
- Resting place: Saint Mary's Whitechapel Episcopal Churchyard
- Occupation: Actress
- Years active: 1929–1960
- Spouses: Henry Fonda (m. 1931; div. 1933) William Wyler (m. 1934; div. 1936) Leland Hayward (m. 1936; div. 1948) Kenneth Wagg (m. 1950)
- Children: 3, including Brooke Hayward

Margaret Brooke Sullavan (May 16, 1909 – January 1, 1960) was an American stage and film actress. She began her career onstage in 1929 with the University Players on Cape Cod, Massachusetts. In 1933, she caught the attention of film director John M. Stahl and made her screen debut that same year in Only Yesterday. She continued to be successful on stage and film, best known for The Shop Around the Corner.

Sullavan preferred working on the stage and made only 16 films, four of which were opposite close friend James Stewart in a popular partnership that included The Mortal Storm and The Shop Around the Corner. Stewart and Sullavan were also close friends of Henry Fonda, to whom Sullavan was married from 1931 to 1933. She was nominated for an Academy Award for Best Actress for her performance in Three Comrades (1938). In the early 1940s, she retired from the screen to devote herself to her children and stage work. She returned to the screen in 1950 to make her last film, No Sad Songs for Me, in which she played a woman dying of cancer. For the rest of her career, she appeared only on the stage. Popular stage portrayals included Terry Randall in Stage Door, Sally Middleton in The Voice of the Turtle and Sabrina Fairchild in Sabrina Fair.

== Early life ==
Sullavan was born May 16, 1909, in Norfolk, Virginia, the daughter of a wealthy stockbroker, Cornelius Sullavan, and his wife, Garland Councill Sullavan. She had a younger brother, Cornelius, and a half-sister, Louise "Weedie" Gregory. The first years of her childhood were spent isolated from other children. She suffered from a painful muscular weakness in the legs that prevented her from walking, so that she was unable to socialize with other children until the age of six. After her recovery she emerged as an adventurous and tomboyish child who preferred playing with children from a poorer neighborhood, much to the disapproval of her class-conscious parents. Her first dance performances were at Sunday school at St. Andrew's Episcopal Church.

She attended boarding school at Chatham Episcopal Institute (now Chatham Hall), in Chatham, Virginia, where she was president of the student body and delivered the salutatory oration in 1927. Sullavan moved to Boston and lived with her half-sister, Weedie, while she studied dance at the Boston Denishawn studio and (against her parents' wishes) drama at the Copley Theatre. When her parents cut her allowance to a minimum, Sullavan defiantly paid her way by working as a clerk in the Harvard Cooperative Bookstore (The Coop), located in Harvard Square, Cambridge.

== Career ==
=== Early years ===
Sullavan succeeded in getting a chorus part in the Harvard Dramatic Society 1929 spring production Close Up, a musical written by Harvard senior Bernard Hanighen, who was later a composer for Broadway and Hollywood.

The President of the Harvard Dramatic Society, Charles Leatherbee, along with the President of Princeton's Theatre Intime, Bretaigne Windust, who together had established the University Players on Cape Cod the summer before, persuaded Sullavan to join them for their second summer season. Another member of the University Players was Henry Fonda, who had the comic lead in Close Up.

In the summer of 1929, Sullavan appeared opposite Fonda in The Devil in the Cheese, her debut on the professional stage. She returned for most of the University Players' 1930 season. In 1931, she squeezed in one production with the University Players between the closing of the Broadway production of A Modern Virgin in July and its tour in September. She rejoined the University Players for most of their 18-week 1930–31 winter season in Baltimore.

Sullavan's parents did not approve of her choice of career. She played the lead in Strictly Dishonorable (1930) by Preston Sturges, which her parents attended. Confronted with her evident talent, they ceased their objections. "To my deep relief," Sullavan later recalled, "I thought I'd have to put up with their yappings on the subject forever."

A Shubert scout saw her in that play as well and eventually she met Lee Shubert himself. At the time, Sullavan was suffering from a bad case of laryngitis and her voice was huskier than usual. Shubert loved it. In subsequent years Sullavan would joke that she cultivated that "laryngitis" into a permanent hoarseness by standing in every available draft.

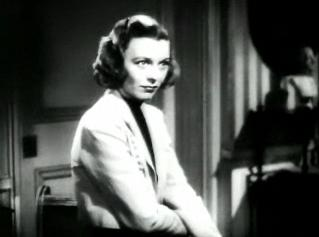
Sullavan in her Oscar-nominated role as Pat Hollmann in Three Comrades (1938)

Sullavan made her debut on Broadway in A Modern Virgin (a comedy by Elmer Harris) on May 20, 1931, and began touring on August 3.

At one point in 1932, she starred in four Broadway flops in a row (If Love Were All, Happy Landing, Chrysalis (with Humphrey Bogart), and Bad Manners), but the critics praised Sullavan for her performances in all of them. In March 1933, Sullavan replaced another actor in Dinner at Eight in New York. Movie director John M. Stahl happened to be watching the play and was intrigued by Sullavan. He decided she would be perfect for a picture he was planning, Only Yesterday.

At that time Sullavan had already turned down offers for five-year contracts from Paramount and Columbia. Universal Pictures offered Sullavan a three-year, two-pictures-per-year contract at $1,200 per week. She accepted it and had a clause put in her contract that allowed her to return to the stage on occasion. Later in her career, Sullavan signed only short-term contracts because she did not want to be "owned" by any studio.

=== Hollywood ===
Sullavan arrived in Hollywood on May 16, 1933, her 24th birthday. Her film debut came that same year in Only Yesterday. When she saw herself in the film's early rushes, she was so appalled that she tried to purchase her contract for $2,500, but Universal refused. In his November 10, 1933, review in The New York Herald Tribune, Richard Watts, Jr. wrote that Sullavan "plays the tragic and lovelorn heroine of this shrewdly sentimental orgy with such forthright sympathy, wise reticence and honest feeling that she establishes herself with some definiteness as one of the cinema people to be watched."

Sullavan's next role came in Little Man, What Now? (1934), a film about a couple struggling to survive in impoverished post–World War I Germany. Universal was reluctant to produce a film about unemployment, starvation and homelessness, but Little Man was an important project to Sullavan. She would list the film appearance among the few Hollywood roles that afforded her a great measure of satisfaction.

In The Good Fairy (1935), Sullavan was able to illustrate her versatility. During the production, she married its director, William Wyler.

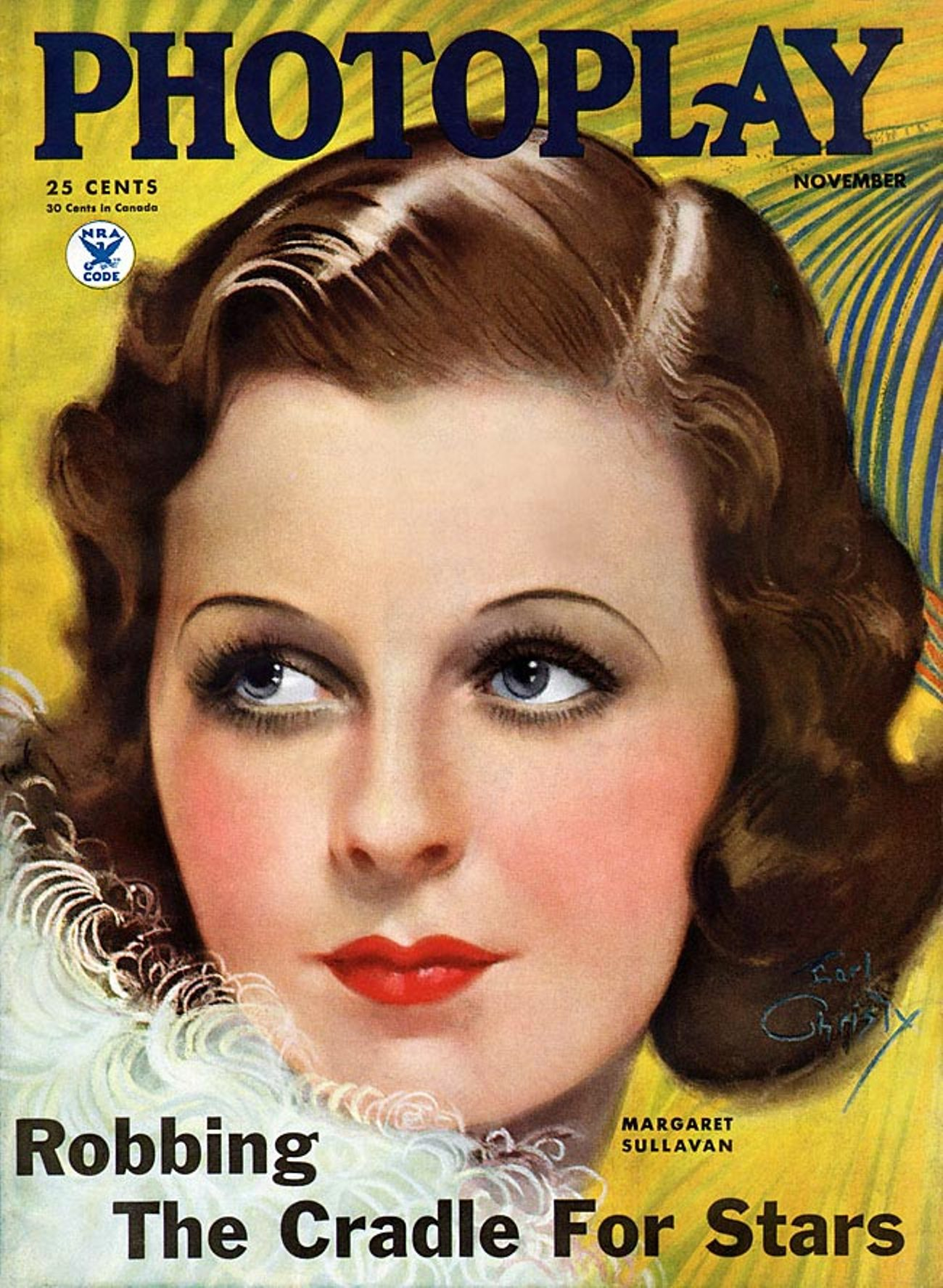
Sullavan on cover of Photoplay, 1934

King Vidor's So Red the Rose (1935) dealt with people in the postbellum South and preceded the publication of Margaret Mitchell's bestselling novel Gone With the Wind by one year and the blockbuster film adaptation by four years. Sullavan played a childish Southern belle who matures into a responsible woman.

In Next Time We Love (1936), Sullavan played opposite the then-unknown James Stewart. She had been campaigning for Stewart to be her leading man, and the studio complied for fear that she would stage a threatened strike. The film dealt with a married couple who had grown apart over the years. This was the first of four films made by Sullavan and Stewart together.

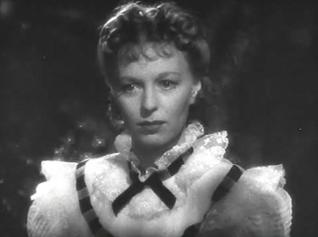
From The Shining Hour (1938)

In the comedy The Moon's Our Home (1936), Sullavan played opposite her ex-husband Henry Fonda as a newly married couple. Dorothy Parker and Alan Campbell were recruited to improve the script's dialogue, reportedly at Sullavan's insistence. Her seventh film, Three Comrades (1938), is a drama set in post–World War I Germany. She gained an Oscar nomination for her role and was named the year's best actress by the New York Film Critics Circle.

Sullavan reunited with Stewart in The Shopworn Angel (1938). Stewart played a sweet, naive Texan soldier on his way to fight in World War I who first marries Sullavan. Sullavan's ninth film was The Shining Hour (1938), in which she played the suicidal sister-in-law of Joan Crawford's character. Crawford insisted on the casting of Sullavan even though Louis B. Mayer warned Crawford that Sullavan could steal the picture from her. In The Shop Around the Corner (1940), Sullavan and Stewart worked together again, playing colleagues who unknowingly exchange letters with each other.

In 1940, Sullavan also appeared in The Mortal Storm, a film about the lives of ordinary Germans during the rise of Adolf Hitler; it was her last film with Stewart. Back Street (1941) was lauded as among the best performances of Sullavan's Hollywood career, a film for which she ceded top billing to Charles Boyer to ensure that he would take the male lead part. So Ends Our Night (1941) was a wartime drama in which Sullavan, on loan to United Artists for a one-picture deal from Universal, played a Jewish exile fleeing the Nazis.

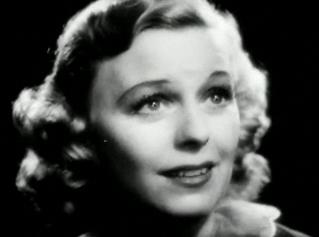
Sullavan as nightclub singer Daisy Heath in The Shopworn Angel (1938)

A 1940 court decision obliged Sullavan to fulfill her original 1933 agreement with Universal, requiring her to appear in two more films for the studio. These films would be Back Street (1941) and the light comedy Appointment for Love (1941).

Cry 'Havoc' (1943) was Sullavan's last film with M-G-M. After its completion, she was free of all film commitments. She had often referred to MGM and Universal as "jails."

=== Films with James Stewart ===
Sullavan's co-starring roles with James Stewart are among the highlights of their early careers. In 1935, Sullavan had decided on doing Next Time We Love. She had strong reservations about the story, but had to "work-off the damned contract." The script contained a role that she thought might be ideal for Stewart, who was the best friend of Sullavan's first husband, actor Henry Fonda. Years earlier, during a casual conversation with some fellow actors on Broadway, Sullavan predicted that Stewart would become a major Hollywood star.

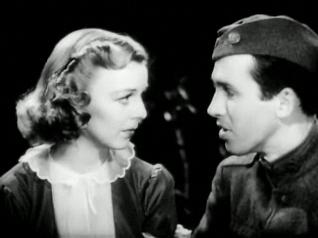
Sullavan and Stewart in The Shopworn Angel (1938)

By 1936, Stewart was a contract player at MGM but securing only small parts in B-movies. Sullavan, under contract with Universal, suggested that the studio test Stewart as her leading man. He was borrowed from MGM to star with Sullavan in Next Time We Love. The inexperienced Stewart had been nervous and unsure of himself during the early stages of production, and director Edward H. Griffith, began bullying him. However, Sullavan believed in Stewart and spent evenings coaching him and helping him scale down his awkward mannerisms and hesitant speech that were soon to be famous. "It was Margaret Sullavan who made James Stewart a star," Griffith later said. Bill Grady of MGM said: "That boy came back from Universal so changed I hardly recognized him." Gossip in Hollywood held that Sullavan's husband William Wyler was suspicious about her rehearsing with Stewart privately. When Sullavan divorced Wyler in 1936 and married Leland Hayward that same year, they moved into a colonial house just a block away from that of Stewart. Stewart's frequent visits to the Sullavan/Hayward home soon restoked the rumors of his romantic feelings for Sullavan.

Sullavan and Stewart's second film together was The Shopworn Angel (1938). Walter Pidgeon, who also starred in the film, later recalled: "I really felt like the odd-man-out in that one. It was really all Jimmy and Maggie ... It was so obvious he was in love with her. He came absolutely alive in his scenes with her, playing with a conviction and a sincerity I never knew him to summon away from her." Sullavan and Stewart appeared in four films together between 1936 and 1940 (Next Time We Love, The Shopworn Angel, The Shop Around the Corner and The Mortal Storm).

=== Later years ===
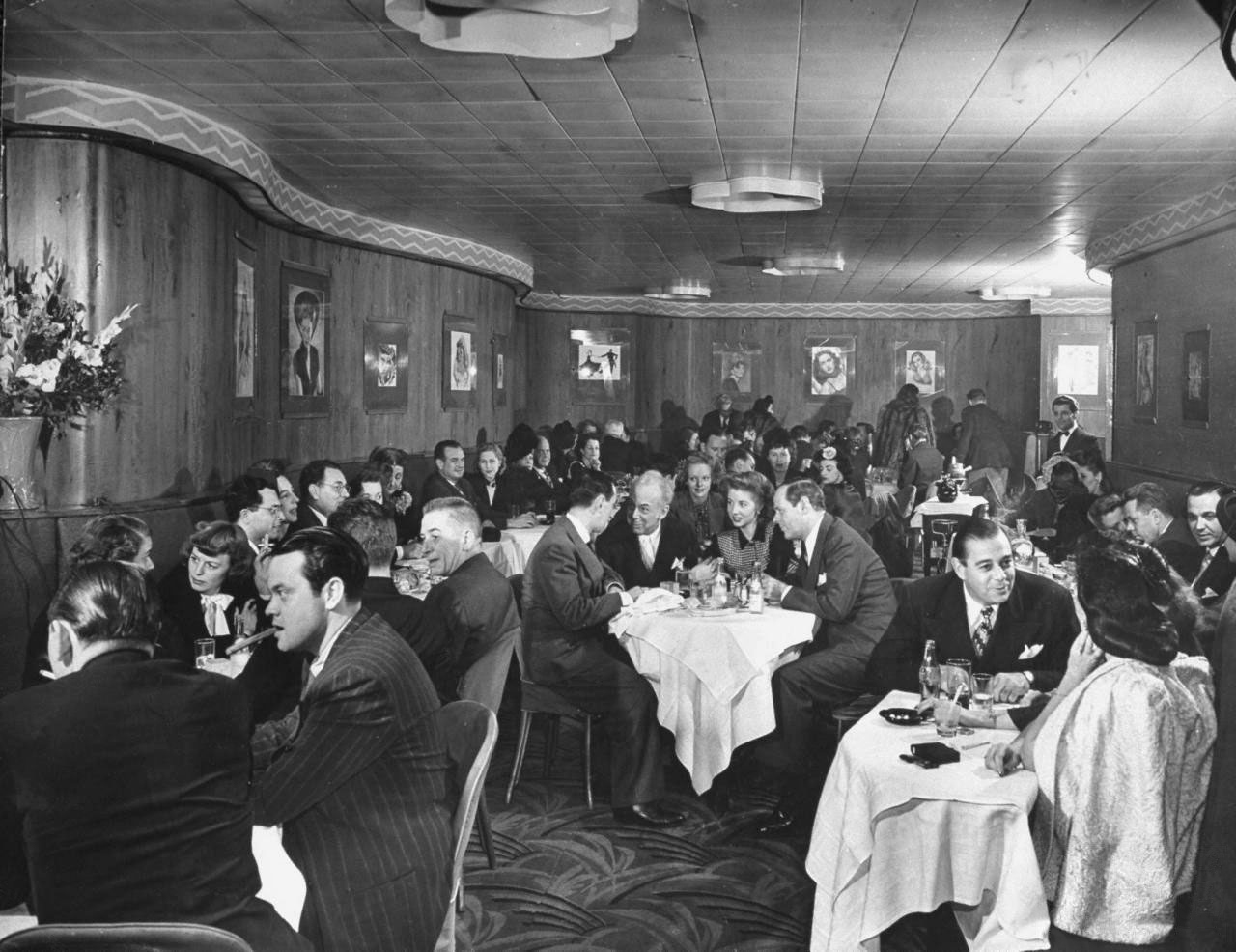
Sullavan and Leland Hayward among the patrons of the Stork Club in New York City, November 1944

Sullavan took a break from films from 1943 to 1950. Throughout her career, Sullavan seemed to prefer the stage to the movies. She felt that only on the stage could she improve her skills as an actor. "When I really learn to act, I may take what I have learned back to Hollywood and display it on the screen," she said in an interview in October 1936 (when she was doing Stage Door on Broadway between movies). "But as long as the flesh-and-blood theatre will have me, it is to the flesh-and-blood theatre I'll belong. I really am stage-struck. And if that be treason, Hollywood will have to make the most of it."

Another reason for her early retirement from the screen (1943) was that she wanted to spend more time with her children, Brooke, Bridget and Bill (then 6, 4 and 2 years old). She felt that she had been neglecting them and felt guilty about it. Sullavan still did stage work on occasion. From 1943 to 1944, she played the sexually inexperienced but curious Sally Middleton in The Voice of the Turtle (by John Van Druten) on Broadway and later in London (1947).

Sullavan returned to the screen in 1950 to do one last picture, No Sad Songs for Me. She played a suburban housewife and mother who learns that she will die of cancer within a year and who then determines to find a "second" wife for her soon-to-be-widower husband (Wendell Corey). Natalie Wood, then 11, played their daughter. After No Sad Songs for Me and its favorable reviews, Sullavan had a number of offers for other films, but she decided to concentrate on the stage for the rest of her career. Still, she did not return to the stage until 1952.

Her choice then was as the suicidal Hester Collyer, who meets fellow sufferer Mr. Miller (played by Herbert Berghof) in Terence Rattigan's The Deep Blue Sea. In 1953, she agreed to appear in Sabrina Fair by Samuel Taylor.

On December 18, 1955, Sullavan appeared as the mystery guest on the TV panel show What's My Line?

In 1955 and 1956, Sullavan appeared in Janus, a comedy by playwright Carolyn Green. Sullavan played the part of Jessica who writes under the pen name Janus, and Robert Preston played her husband. The play ran for 251 performances from November 1955 to June 1956.

In the late 1950s, Sullavan's hearing and depression were getting worse. However, in 1959, she agreed to do Sweet Love Remembered by playwright Ruth Goetz. It was to be Sullavan's first Broadway appearance in four years. Rehearsals began on December 1, 1959. She had mixed emotions about a return to acting, and her depression soon became clear to everyone: "I loathe acting", she said on the day she started rehearsals. "I loathe what it does to my life. It cancels you out. You cannot live while you are working. You are a person surrounded by an unbreachable wall".

== Personal life ==
Sullavan had a reputation for being both temperamental and straightforward. On one occasion, Henry Fonda had decided to take up a collection for a 4th of July fireworks display. After Sullavan refused to make a contribution, Fonda complained loudly to a fellow actor. Sullavan rose from her seat and doused Fonda from head to foot with a pitcher of ice water. Fonda made a stately exit, and Sullavan, composed and unconcerned, returned to her table and ate heartily.

Sullavan refused to allow the firing of a writer on No Sad Songs for Me for his left-wing views. M-G-M studio chief Louis B. Mayer always seemed wary and nervous in her presence. "She was the only player who outbullied Mayer", Eddie Mannix of MGM later said of Sullavan. "She gave him the willies". Some have attributed the death of director and producer Sam Wood, a keen anti-Communist, to a dispute he had with Sullavan. Wood died from a heart attack shortly after a raging argument with Sullavan.

=== Marriages and family ===
Sullavan was married four times. At age 22, she married actor Henry Fonda on December 25, 1931, while both were performing with the University Players in their 18-week winter season at the Congress Hotel ballroom in Baltimore, Maryland. "She was a character even the first time I met her," Fonda recalled. Sullavan and Fonda separated after two months and divorced in 1933, but remained longtime friends, and their children also became friends. Jane Fonda remembers a "vivid image" of Sullavan. "What impressed me the most was how athletic and tomboyish she was. Dad had taught her how to walk on her hands during their courtship, and she could still suddenly turn herself upside down—and there she'd be, walking along on her hands." Peter Fonda named his daughter in honor of Bridget Hayward, Sullavan's second child. He had admitted he was in love with Hayward, but they never had a relationship.

After separating from Fonda, Sullavan began a relationship with Broadway producer Jed Harris that was tumultuous and short-lived. Then, during the shooting of The Good Fairy, she began a relationship with its director, William Wyler. He said, "One day I looked at the rushes and she didn't look good." The cameraman informed him that Sullavan had had a fight with him that day of shooting, and that "When she's happy she looks pretty, when she's upset she doesn't!" So, Wyler asked her on a date and their relationship blossomed. They married in November 1934 and divorced in March 1936. Wyler remembered it as "A miserable wedding. Jeez. Awful. My lawyer had arranged it. I chartered this airplane, and flew to Arizona. We went to this justice of the peace; he stood there in a robe and slippers and said, 'All right, here, get together'—the radio was going all this time—and he married us."

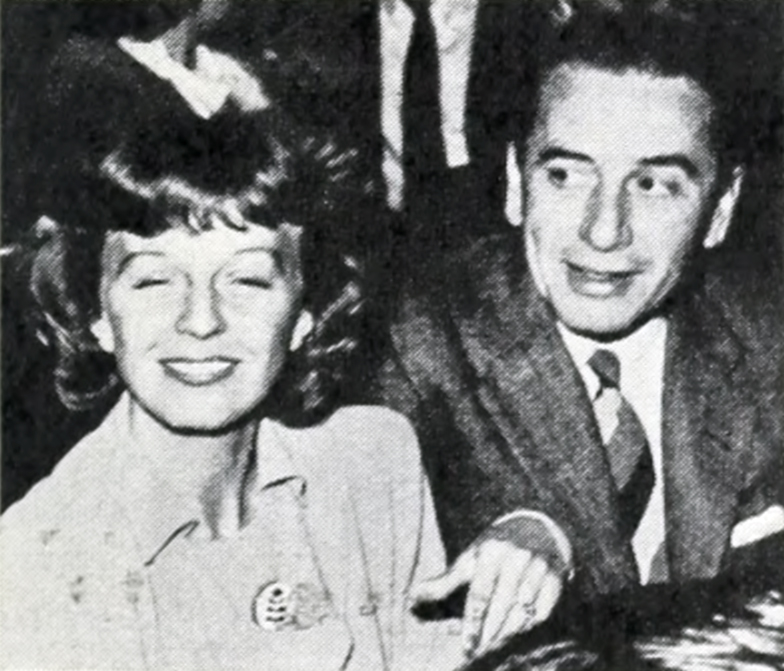
Sullavan and Leland Hayward, 1942

Sullavan's third marriage was to agent and producer Leland Hayward, Sullavan's agent since 1931. At the time of the marriage on November 15, 1936, Sullavan was pregnant with the couple's first child. Their daughter, Brooke Hayward, later became an actress and a writer. The couple had two more children, Bridget Hayward and William Hayward III ("Bill"), who became a film producer and attorney. In 1947, Sullavan filed for divorce after discovering that Hayward was having an affair with socialite Slim Keith. Their divorce became final on April 20, 1948.

In 1950, Sullavan married for a fourth and final time, to English investment banker Kenneth Wagg. They remained married until her death in 1960.

=== Mental breakdown ===
In 1955, when Sullavan's two younger children told their mother that they preferred to stay with their father permanently, she suffered a nervous breakdown. Sullavan's eldest daughter, Brooke, later wrote about the breakdown in her 1977 autobiography Haywire; Sullavan begged her son to stay with her. He remained adamant in his refusal, and his mother had started to cry. "This time she couldn't stop. Even from my room the sound was so painful I went into my bathroom and put my hands on my ears." In another scene from the book, a friend of the family (Millicent Osborne) had been alarmed by the sound of whimpering from the bedroom: "She walked in and found Mother under the bed, huddled in a fetal position. Kenneth was trying to get her out. The more authoritative his tone of voice, the farther under she crawled. Millicent Osborne took him aside and urged him to speak gently, to let her stay there until she came out of her own accord." Eventually Sullavan agreed to spend some time (two and a half months) in a private mental institution. Her two younger children, Bridget and Bill, also spent time in various institutions. Bridget died of a drug overdose in October 1960, while Bill died of a self-inflicted gunshot wound in March 2008.

=== Hearing loss ===
Sullavan suffered from the congenital hearing defect otosclerosis that worsened as she aged, making her more and more hearing-impaired. Her voice had developed a throatiness because she could hear low tones better than high ones. From early 1957, Sullavan's hearing declined so much that she was becoming depressed and sleepless and often wandered about all night. She often stayed in bed for days, her only words: "Just let me be, please."

She had kept her hearing problem largely hidden. On January 8, 1960 (one week after Sullavan's death), New York Post reporter Nancy Seely wrote: "The thunderous applause of a delighted audience—was it only a dim murmur over the years to Margaret Sullavan? Did the poised and confident mien of the beautiful actress mask a sick fear, night after night, that she'd miss an important cue?"

Sullavan had an operation done by Dr. Julian Lempert in the late 40s, which Brooke described as a “success, and restored full hearing to Mother’s left ear,” but she didn't follow his advice for cutting down on “diving, shooting or flying.”

Sullavan bequeathed her ears to the Lempert Institute of Otymology. Lempert believed that "there was so much misunderstanding of some of the things she did, the nervousness, the worry—which were simply a result of her deafness ... She suffered as do most who are hard of hearing who try to keep it a secret and make themselves nervous wrecks."

== Death ==
On January 1, 1960, at about 5:30 p.m., Sullavan was found in bed, barely alive and unconscious, in a hotel room in New Haven, Connecticut. Her copy of the script to Sweet Love Remembered, in which she was then starring during its tryout in New Haven, was found open beside her, as well as a bottle of prescribed pills. Sullavan was rushed to Grace New Haven Hospital, but shortly after 6:00 p.m. she was pronounced dead on arrival. She was 50 years old.

No note was found to indicate suicide, and initially no conclusion was reached as to whether her death was the result of a deliberate or an accidental overdose of barbiturates. Ultimately, the county coroner officially ruled Sullavan's death an accidental overdose. After a private memorial service in Greenwich, Connecticut, with such attendees as former friend and co-star Joan Crawford, theatre producer Martin Gabel, and actress Sandra Church, Sullavan was interred at Saint Mary's Whitechapel Episcopal Churchyard in Lancaster, Virginia.

For her contribution to the motion picture industry, Margaret Sullavan has a star on the Hollywood Walk of Fame at 1751 Vine Street. She was inducted, posthumously, into the American Theater Hall of Fame in 1981.

Sullavan was the favorite actress of silent-film beauty Louise Brooks, who said Sullavan was "the person I would be if I could be anyone" and described her as “Strange, fey, mysterious—like a voice singing in the snow.” Brooks thought Sullavan's life could only be understood by her love of Leland Hayward, even after their divorce. Brooks wrote this: "After he left her to marry Nancy (Slim) Hawks in 1947, this terrifyingly self-willed woman shredded her career through the following twelve years with her struggle to repossess him. When Nancy divorced him there was a flaming period of hope in 1959. Then came the news of Leland's decision to marry Pamela Churchill—and she sank in to despair and death."

== In popular culture ==
Sullavan's eldest daughter, actress Brooke Hayward, wrote Haywire, a best-selling memoir about her family, that was adapted into the miniseries Haywire starring Lee Remick as Margaret Sullavan and Jason Robards as Leland Hayward.

== Filmography ==
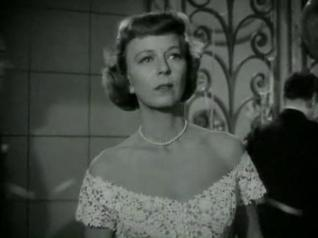
Sullavan in her final film, No Sad Songs for Me (1950)

Year	Title	Role	Notes
1933	Only Yesterday	Mary Lane	
1934	Little Man, What Now?	Emma "Lämmchen" Pinneberg	
1935	The Good Fairy	Luisa "Lu" Ginglebusher	
1935	So Red the Rose	Valette Bedford	
1936	Next Time We Love	Cicely Tyler	
1936	The Moon's Our Home	Cherry Chester/Sarah Brown	
1938	Three Comrades	Patricia "Pat" Hollmann	New York Film Critics Circle Award for Best Actress
1938	The Shopworn Angel	Daisy Heath	
1938	The Shining Hour	Judy Linden	
1940	The Shop Around the Corner	Klara Novak	
1940	The Mortal Storm	Freya Roth	
1941	Back Street	Ray Smith	
1941	So Ends Our Night	Ruth Holland	
1941	Appointment for Love	Dr. Jane Alexander	
1943	Cry 'Havoc'	Lt. Mary Smith	
1950	No Sad Songs for Me	Mary Scott	

== Radio appearances ==
Year	Program	Episode/source
1935	Lux Radio Theatre	Peg o' My Heart
1937	Lux Radio Theatre	The Petrified Forest
1938	Lux Radio Theatre	Next Time We Love
1938	The Campbell Playhouse	Rebecca
1940	Screen Guild Players	The Shop Around the Corner

== Awards and nominations ==
Year	Organization	Category	Work	Result	Ref.
1938	New York Film Critics Circle	Best Actress	Three Comrades	Won	
1939	Academy Awards	Best Actress	Three Comrades	Nominated	
1952	Emmy Awards	Best Actress	—N/a	Nominated	
1960	Hollywood Walk of Fame	Star - Motion Pictures	—N/a	Won	

== See also ==
- 1930s in film

== Bibliography ==
- Hayward, Brooke (1977). Haywire. New York: Alfred A. Knopf. ISBN 0-394-49325-7.
- Kennedy, Harold J. (1978). No Pickle, No Performance. An Irreverent Theatrical Excursion from Tallulah to Travolta. New York: Doubleday.
