= Kenneth Wagg =

English rackets player, banker, and theatrical producer

- Born: 6 March 1909
- Died: 7 May 2000 (aged 91)
- Education: Eton College; Magdalen College, Oxford
- Employer: Horlicks
- Spouses: Katherine Horlick (m. 1930–1946) Margaret Sullavan (m. 1950–1960) Clare Sandars (m. 1973)

Kenneth Arthur Wagg (6 March 1909–7 May 2000) was an English rackets player, banker, and theatrical producer.

== Early life and business career ==
Wagg was born in 1909; his great-grandfather was the founder of the merchant bank Helbert Wagg. He was educated at Eton College and Magdalen College, Oxford. Wagg worked for his family's bank after graduating from Oxford. Wagg became a director of Horlicks following his marriage to Katherine Horlick and served as chairman of Horlick's North American subsidiary after the Second World War. Wagg joined the British Army and served with the Rifle Brigade in the North African campaign in the war. Wagg produced several West End plays in the 1950s and 60s including South by Julien Green, Belle or The Ballad of Doctor Crippen by Wolf Mankowitz and the 1958 play Four Winds by Thomas Phipps.

== Rackets ==
Wagg became a noted player of rackets while at Eton. Wagg formed a doubles partnership with Ian Akers-Douglas. He and Akers-Douglas won the Public Schools championship of 1927 and the Noel Bruce Cup in 1932. The pair were victorious in the national Amateur Doubles championship of 1932, 1933 and 1935. Wagg was part of the inaugural British rackets tour of the United States following the Second World War. He was victorious in the Army rackets tournament with Cosmo Crawley. Wagg reached the semi-finals of the British rackets championship in 1952, also winning the US doubles title that year. Wagg and Geoffrey Atkins lost the final of the US doubles in 1953. In 1958 Wagg won the US doubles title with Atkins. The New York Times described the match as "one of the most remarkable feats recorded on a rackets court" as Wagg and Atkins came back from 7–0 in the first game with "the greatest single hand of rackets within memory" as their opponents, the American players Robert Grant and Clarence Pell, "found themselves helpless against the absolute perfection, cleverness and finality of the British pair". Wagg and Atkins won the US doubles championship again in 1961 and won the individual Canadian title in 1960.

The Times wrote that "Wagg is a brilliant player with one of the best backhand strokes seen since the [First World] war" and wrote of him in 1935 that he "must be classed as the best doubles player of the game".

Wagg was the captain of several British racket teams in the International Cup in the 1950s and 60s.

== Personal life ==
Wagg married the food company heiress Katherine Horlick in 1933; the couple had four sons and divorced in 1946.

He married actress Margaret Sullavan in 1950; she died of barbiturate poisoning in 1960. Wagg later described "the memories of an all too brief life with the most upright, unique and attractive character I had ever met".

Wagg married the actress Clare Sandars, Lady McEwen, and converted to Catholicism in 1973 shortly before their marriage. He worked as fundraiser for Catholic causes in the last years of his life.
