= Hawksian woman =

Character archetype of an up-front, tough woman

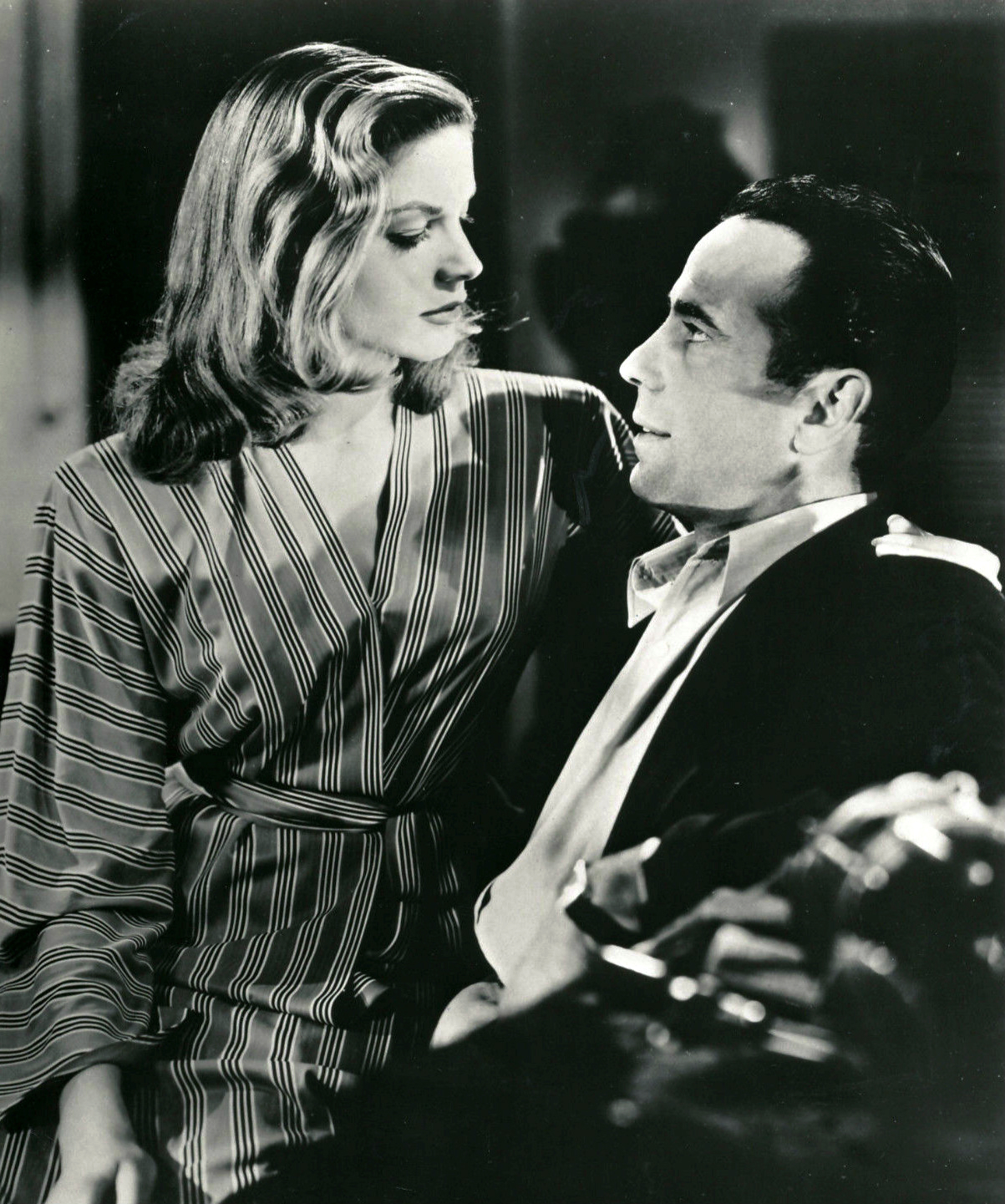
Lauren Bacall with Humphrey Bogart in To Have and Have Not (1944), where Bacall portrays a wanderer named after Howard Hawks's wife Slim Keith

In film theory, the "Hawksian woman" is a character archetype of the tough-talking woman, popularized in film by director Howard Hawks through his use of actresses such as Katharine Hepburn, Ann Dvorak, Rosalind Russell, Barbara Stanwyck, and Angie Dickinson. The best known Hawksian woman is probably Lauren Bacall, who iconically played the type opposite Humphrey Bogart in To Have and Have Not and The Big Sleep. The archetype was first identified by film critic Naomi Wise in 1971.

== Characteristics ==
The Hawksian woman is up-front in speaking her mind and keeping up with her male counterparts in witty banter, as well as taking action to get what she wants both personally and sexually. She is usually seen as a frank fast-talker who can beat a man in verbal sparring.

Despite his preference for this kind of woman, Hawks never considered himself a feminist, and simply stated that he thought these women were lively and interesting both in films and in life. Hawks's marriage to actress Slim Keith shows this interest in life and directing in her book Slim: Memories of a Rich and Imperfect Life. It is believed that Lauren Bacall was the perfect woman for Hawks. In Keith's book it states "Howard had been working on this formula woman for years in his films. Rather, it was that, until he met me, the woman of his dreams was only in his head. And until Howard got to Betty Bacall, there hadn’t been an actress to make that dream come alive on screen." Hawks's first film, A Girl in Every Port, exhibited the start of the female lead's formula, in which Louise Brooks was directed as the very first Hawksian woman. A later example of a Hawksian woman would be Barbara Stanwyck's character in Ball of Fire, in which she plays Sugarpuss O'Shea, alongside Gary Cooper. Hawksian women would work under Hawks's direction with exclusive contracts, using an actress like Lauren Bacall just twice a year to make the public want them more.

The Hawksian woman plays across general female role expectations for the setting, defining herself and her choices and leading action. This albeit on masculine terms as denoted by being known, like the male protagonists, by nickname rather than forename. This makes the Hawksian woman especially different from other female archetypes of the time, in that she is considered "one of the gang" rather than an object of sexual desire. She can hold her own in a wit-driven argument, have the same profession as her male counterpart, and keep her cool under stress. The equality given to the Hawksian woman by the director, however, does not detract from her feminine qualities, such as seductiveness and softness. The strength of the Hawksian woman often brings out the more masculine qualities of an otherwise quiet and timid male lead. Typically Hawksian women came from either the aristocracy and learned to appreciate their working man's ideals, or were hard-working professionals themselves who fought for the good of the common man. Hawks discussed his preference for this kind of woman in some detail with Joseph McBride, taking up a full chapter of Hawks on Hawks (1982).

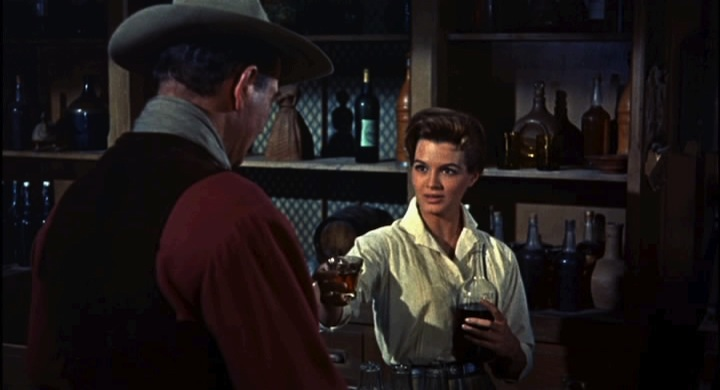
Angie Dickinson as "Feathers", opposite John Wayne ("Chance") in Hawks' Rio Bravo (1959)

Hawksian women would be tailored in well-cut, sporty styles that were attractive yet down-to-earth. Physically Hawksian women are not all classic beauties, but rather are carried more by their spunk and charisma than their physical features.

== Decline ==
According to some film critics, the Hawksian woman slowly faded from Hollywood in the 1950s, as a new archetype for female leads came to the screen. World War II had ended, and the role of women in society had changed. Germaine Greer describes this archetype as the "Female Eunuch", powerless women often portrayed by actresses like Marilyn Monroe and Catherine Deneuve.

== Influence ==
John Carpenter, an avowed Hawks fan, includes Hawksian women in most of his movies, from Assault on Precinct 13 through Ghosts of Mars. Examples of Hawksian women in Carpenter's films include the characters played by Karen Allen in Starman and Adrienne Barbeau in The Fog and Escape from New York (the latter was also his real-life wife at the time).

In a May 2000 profile of actress Cameron Diaz in The New York Times, journalist Dave Kehr remarked that Diaz "would have fit marvelously well into the tradition of the Hawksian woman, with her sense of fun, camaraderie and forthright sexuality."

== See also ==
- Femme fatale
- Flapper
- Screwball comedy
- Tsundere
