= Goldie (film) =

1931 American film by Benjamin Stoloff

- Theatrical release poster
- Directed by: Benjamin Stoloff
- Written by: Paul Perez; Gene Towne
- Based on: A Girl in Every Port; 1928 film by Howard Hawks
- Produced by: William Fox
- Starring: Spencer Tracy; Warren Hymer; Jean Harlow
- Cinematography: Ernest Palmer
- Edited by: Alex Troffey
- Music by: R.H. Bassett; Hugo Friedhofer
- Distributed by: Fox Film Corporation
- Release date: June 28, 1931
- Running time: 68 minutes
- Country: United States
- Language: English

Goldie is a 1931 American pre-Code romantic comedy film starring Warren Hymer, Spencer Tracy and Jean Harlow. The script was written by Paul Perez and Gene Towne, and directed by Benjamin Stoloff. It was made before the Hays Code was rigidly enforced. It is a remake of Howard Hawks' 1928 silent film, A Girl in Every Port.

== Plot ==
In every port, sailor Bill meets girls who sailor Spike has already met and talked into getting his signature tattoo. When Bill and Spike finally meet, they become friends. Then, they meet carny high diver Goldie.

== Cast ==
- Warren Hymer as Spike
- Spencer Tracy as Bill
- Jean Harlow as Goldie
- George Raft as a pickpocket (uncredited)
