= A Girl in Every Port (1928 film) =

1928 film

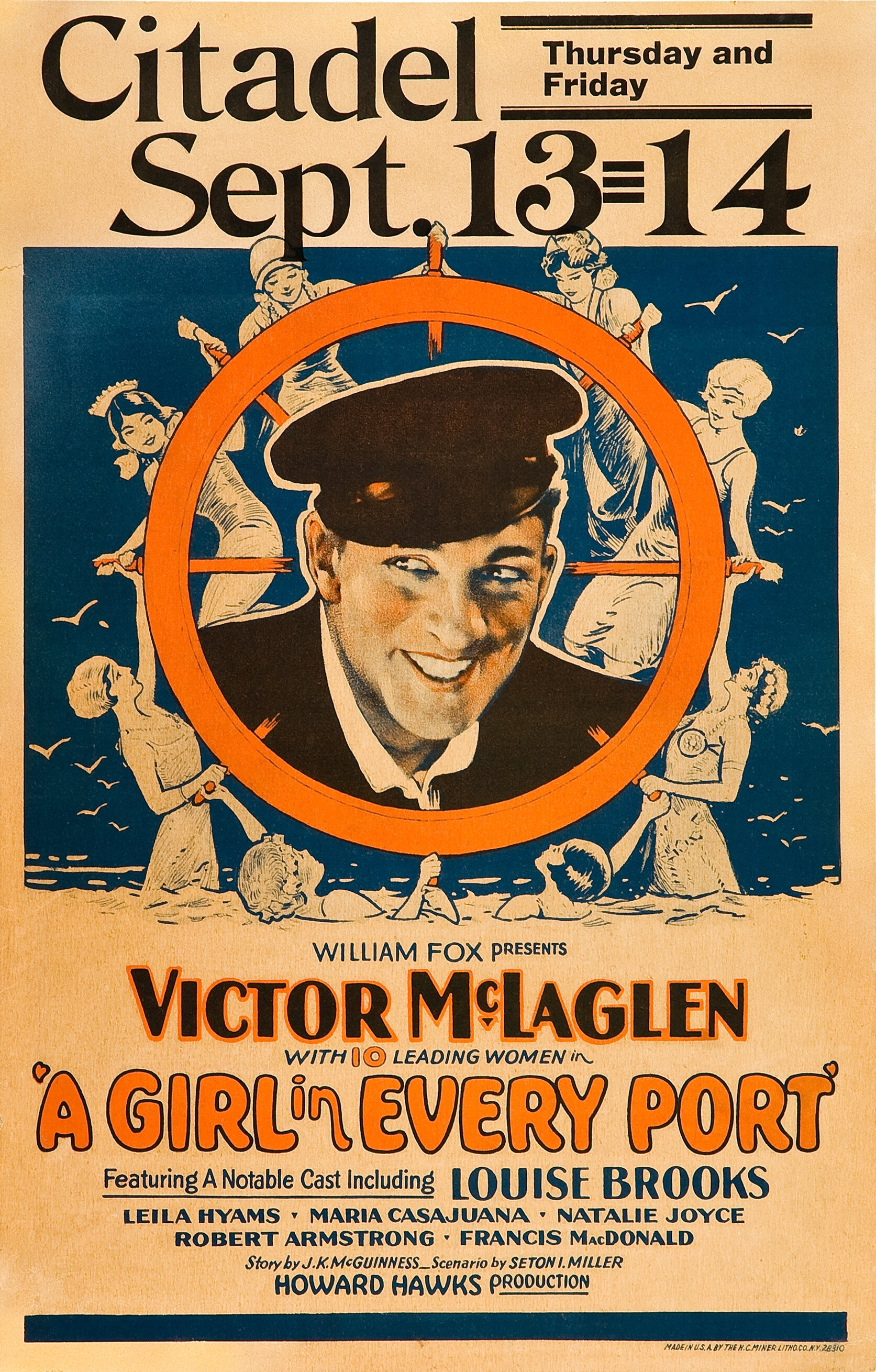
- Film poster
- Directed by: Howard Hawks
- Written by: Seton I. Miller; Malcolm Stuart Boylan (intertitles)
- Screenplay by: James Kevin McGuinness
- Story by: Howard Hawks
- Produced by: William Fox
- Starring: Victor McLaglen; Robert Armstrong; Louise Brooks
- Cinematography: Rudolph J. Bergquist; L. William O'Connell
- Edited by: Ralph Dixon
- Production company: Fox Film Corporation
- Distributed by: Fox Film Corporation
- Release date: February 26, 1928 (U.S.)
- Running time: 78 minutes (6 reels)
- Country: United States
- Language: Silent (English intertitles)

A Girl in Every Port (1928) by Howard Hawks

A Girl in Every Port is a 1928 American silent comedy film based on an original story by Howard Hawks, who directed the film, as well. The feature stars Victor McLaglen, Robert Armstrong, and Louise Brooks. It was produced and distributed by the Fox Film Corporation, which later remade it as Goldie in 1931, with Spencer Tracy and Jean Harlow. A print of the 1928 movie exists at the George Eastman House and a DVD-R was released in 2002.

== Plot ==
Spike travels the world as the mate of a schooner. He has a little address book full of sweethearts, but everywhere he goes, he finds that someone has been there before him, leaving behind with each girl a heart-shaped charm with an anchor inscribed on it. In Central America, he takes a dislike to another sailor, Salami, but before they can settle their differences, they brawl with the police and are thrown in jail. Then Spike notices that Salami has a ring shaped like a heart with an anchor inscribed. He has finally found his nemesis. When they are released, they look for a private place to fight, but accidentally fall into the water. Oddly, Spike cannot swim, so when Salami rescues him, they become the best of friends. Inseparable, they sail the seas on the same ships.

Just before they reach Marseille, Spike tells Salami he has finally saved enough money to buy a house and some horses, cattle, and chickens, but Salami scoffs at the idea. When they dock, Salami has to stay aboard due to a toothache and worries that Spike will get into trouble without him. At a carnival, Spike becomes entranced by the high diver "Mam'selle Godiva". When the barker signals her that Spike gave him the most money to watch her performance, she latches onto him. He is so in love with her that he asks her if she would like to settle down with him; she leads him on so she can get the rest of his money.

When Spike first introduces Salami to her, Salami recognizes her. She was his girlfriend at Coney Island until he left her. She makes it clear that she would very much like to renew their relationship, but he is not interested, nor does he want to hurt Spike by telling him the truth. One night, she sends Spike on an errand so she can visit Salami, whom she finds asleep in bed. She tells him that she has gotten most of Spike's savings and is about to drop him. Salami refuses to take her back; he gets dressed and goes to a bar to get away from her. However, Spike returns to their lodgings and finds her there. He also spots Salami's unmade bed, so he assumes the worst. Meanwhile, Salami gets into a fight with two other sailors and yells for his friend's help. Spike knocks the two men out, then does the same to Salami. After thinking over all the fun they had together, however, he asks Salami if he betrayed him. When Salami says no, they become friends again.

== Cast ==
- Victor McLaglen as Spike Madden
- Robert Armstrong as Salami
- Louise Brooks as Marie
- Maria Casajuana as Chiquita
- Natalie Joyce as Girl in Panama
- Francis McDonald as Gang Leader
- Leila Hyams as Sailor's Wife
- Natalie Kingston as South Sea Island Girl
- Sally Rand as Girl in Bombay
- Dorothy Mathews as Girl in Panama
- Elena Jurado as Girl in Panama
- Phalba Morgan as Lena, girl in Holland
- Felix Valle as Lena's husband
- Greta Yoltz as Other girl in Holland
- Caryl Lincoln as Girl from Liverpool
- William Demarest as Fellow in Bombay (uncredited)
- Myrna Loy as Girl in China (uncredited)

== Background ==
Characters talk very tersely in Hawks films, refusing to put their thoughts and feelings into explicit speeches, which would either sentimentalize or vulgarize those internal abstractions. Instead, Hawks’s characters reveal their feelings in action, not in talk, showing what they mean by what they do, not what they say. Hawks deflects his portrayal of the inner life from explicit speeches to symbolic physical objects—concrete visual images of things that convey the intentions of the person who handles, uses, or controls the piece of physical matter.

— International Dictionary of Films and Filmmakers

Howard Hawks went on to direct many notable movies, including, Bringing Up Baby, Sergeant York (nominated for Best Director), Gentlemen Prefer Blondes, and Rio Bravo. Author Todd McCarthy wrote in his book Howard Hawks: The Grey Fox of Hollywood, that A Girl in Every Port is considered by film scholars to be the most important film of Hawks's silent career because it is his first film to introduce many of the Hawksian themes and characters that would continue until his final films. It was his first "love story between two men", with two men bonding over their duty, skills, and careers and considering their friendship to be more important than relationships with women.

In his book Hawks on Hawks, Joseph McBride asked the director: "What is the reason for the running bit of business in A Girl in Every Port of one guy pulling the other guy’s finger?" Hawks replied: "You ever hit anybody hard? Your finger goes out of joint, and somebody takes it and pulls it back into joint. I hit Hemingway, and I broke the whole back of my hand. I wish it had just gone out of joint." McBride asks him why he hit Hemingway, which Hawks replies: "He just said, Can you hit? I broke my whole hand. He laughed like hell, and he sat up all night making a splint out of a tomato can so that I could go shooting with him the next morning. It didn’t do my hand any good. It’s an absolutely different shape." McBride then asks of Hawks: "Was the finger business in A Girl in Every Port supposed to be a gesture of friendship? You used it again with Kirk Douglas and Dewey Martin in The Big Sky." Hawks stated, "Oh, it’s just like Wayne rolling cigarettes for Dean Martin. One thing you can do is look at all the pictures I’ve ever made, and you’ll see that nobody pats another on the back. That’s the goddamnedest inane thing I’ve ever known."

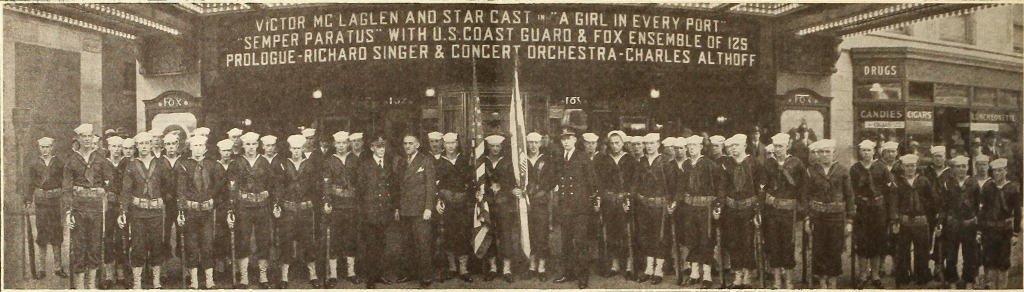
Coast Guard officers at Fox Theater in Washington, DC (c. 1928)

=== Semper Paratus ===
During the film's run at the Fox Theater in Washington, DC, a detachment of 50 Coast Guard officers was recruited to appear at the theater for the inauguration of "Semper Paratus", the official song of the U.S. Coast Guard. The song had recently been written by an officer and adopted by Admiral Frederick C. Billard, Commandant of the Coast Guard. The officers appeared at each performance during the rendition of the song.

=== Versions ===
The film was shot in November and December, 1927, at Fox's studios in Hollywood. Location shooting was done on a boating trip to Santa Cruz Island, located along the California coast. The 78-minutes currently available version omits chapters with girls in Liverpool, a South Sea Island, Singapore and Bombay. These girls are mentioned in some reviews and publicity.

== Reviews and reception ==
Swiss writer Blaise Cendrars said the film "definitively marked the first appearance of contemporary cinema", and that the movie represented the first of Hawks' "buddy films". A reviewer for The New York Times praised the film, saying, "the incidents are set forth in a rollicking fashion with none other than the towering Victor McLaglen filling the part of Madden...Robert Armstrong’s acting of the part of Salami is natural. He gives you a good idea of the fearlessness of the individual." Variety compares the friendship to that of Damon and Pythias.

The Film Daily reported in March 1928 that the feature had broken the "world's record" for a single day's box-office receipts at the Roxy Theater in New York City, when it grossed $29,463.00 on Washington's Birthday. An exhibitor from Michigan wrote in the Exhibitors Herald that, "the salesman said that this was a good picture when he sold it to me...time must have rotted it for it is one of the smuttiest pictures on the market. If you want to promote immorality, by all means play this one. I have to use care and precaution in the selection of pictures, and this one brought plenty of criticism".
