= Hawks on Hawks =

Book of interviews between Joseph McBride, Howard Hawks

- Author: Joseph McBride
- Publisher: University of California Press
- Publication date: 1982
- ISBN: 0-520-04552-1

Hawks on Hawks is a book of interviews between critic Joseph McBride and director Howard Hawks first published in 1982. Hawks explains his views on directing and storytelling, and his work with such stars as Carole Lombard, John Barrymore, Katharine Hepburn, Cary Grant, Lauren Bacall, Humphrey Bogart, John Wayne and Marilyn Monroe and such writers as Ben Hecht, Charles MacArthur, Leigh Brackett, Ernest Hemingway and William Faulkner.

== Background ==
McBride explains the origins of the book: "François Truffaut, the French director and critic who conducted a landmark book-length interview with Alfred Hitchcock in the mid-1960s, told me in 1974 that he wished a similar book could be done with Hawks... Oddly enough, when Truffaut suggested to me that someone should do a book on Hawks comparable to his book on Hitchcock, I was then in the process of doing just such a book without even realizing it. I first met Hawks in November 1970, at the Chicago Film Festival, a month before the premiere of what would turn out to be his last film, Rio Lobo. After transcribing and publishing his discussion with the audience at the festival, I edited a book of articles on him as Focus on Howard Hawks in 1972.

Having a book on his movies published led to the opportunity of moderating several panel discussions with Hawks in Southern California... And as luck would have it, I had the chance for one last, exhaustive interview session with Hawks over a three-day period in the fall of 1977, just two months before his death, when the Directors Guild of America and the Los Angeles Cinematheque asked me to moderate a 'Weekend with Howard Hawks and His Films' in Laguna Beach. By that time it had dawned on me that all the talking I'd been doing with Hawks over the last seven years was adding up to a thorough reminiscence and analysis of his career. I deliberately used the Laguna Beach weekend to explore areas that remained to be covered in his work, and when it was all over I had the interview book that Truffaut had suggested need to be done."

== Content ==
Hawks begins by saying that "All I'm doing is telling a story. I don't analyze or do a lot of thinking about it. I work on the fact that if I like somebody and think they're attractive, I can make them attractive. If I think a thing's funny, then people laugh at it. If I think a thing's dramatic, the audience does." McBride asks Hawks "Do all good directors have a personal style?", to which he replies "The men that I think are good directors certainly have a style. I can go and tell who directed it... everybody has his own particular way of telling his story, and I think if a director's any good he has his own way of telling it."

The two walk through Hawks's career, starting in the silent era. They discuss his pictures, notably Scarface, Twentieth Century, His Girl Friday, Sergeant York, Ball of Fire, To Have and Have Not, The Big Sleep, Red River and Rio Bravo. Hawks speaks of the importance of good writers: "I'm such a coward that unless I get a great writer, I don't want to make a picture. But Hemingway, Faulkner, Hecht and MacArthur, Jules Furthman, all those people were damned good." He says Noël Coward asked him 'What do you call the kind of dialogue that you use?' And I said, 'Well, Hemingway calls it oblique dialogue. I call it three-cushion. Because you hit it over here and over here and go over here to get the meaning. You don't state it right out.'" Regarding the writing of The Big Sleep, Hawks says he sent a telegram to Raymond Chandler asking "him to explain who killed so-and-so. He wired back and said it was George someone. I said it couldn't be George, he was down at the beach at that time.' He wired back and said, 'Then I don't know either.' Actually, we didn't care. It was the first time I made a picture and just decided I wasn't going to explain things. I was just going to try and make good scenes.'"

Throughout the book, Hawks talks about his experience working with actors. Regarding Katharine Hepburn in Bringing Up Baby, he says "We had trouble with Kate at first. The great trouble is people trying to be funny. If they don't try to be funny, then they are funny." He recalls that after the preview of Rio Lobo, James Caan "came up to me and said 'Why didn't you tell me I was playing a comic part?' And I said, 'You'd have spoiled it. You'd have tried to be funny.'"

Regarding the trope of the "Hawksian woman", Hawks says "It just happens that kind of woman is attractive to me. I merely am doing something that I like. And I've seen so many pictures where the hero gets in the moonlight and says silly things to a girl, I'd reverse it and let the girl do the chasing around, you know, and it works pretty well. Anyway, I know that a little better than I do that other stuff. I'd much rather work with a character like that than some little Puritan violet. I think it's pretty apparent the kind of people that we like, that you see on the screen. I like Carole Lombard. I like Rita Hayworth. I like Angie Dickinson."

Something Hawks returns to is his preference for character over story. Regarding El Dorado, Hawks says "I'm much more interested in the story of a friendship between two men than I am about a range war or something like that. There's probably no stronger emotion than friendship between men. When it comes to Wayne and his relationships, that's better than the story."

== Reception ==
The review in Film Quarterly said "Hawks's astuteness in story construction and mastery of film technique are manifest in his production anecdotes, and his analyses of actors' personalities are insightful." The review in the Los Angeles Times said "The author really knew Howard Hawks, and interviewed the crusty old director; the crust and the insight come through in the interviews. There are going to be many biographies of Hawks, but they will all lean heavily on this book; the pioneer so honestly reveals himself and the people with whom he worked." George Weales, reviewing the book in The Georgia Review, wrote that "it is a worthwhile introduction to Hawks's working method, his sense of his own strengths, his ideas about acting, directing, and watching movies..." Weales criticizes McBride for not correcting some of Hawks's statements; McBride does not point out that Lombard had been in pictures before Twentieth Century. Weales praises the book for its the insight it offers into Hawks: "Hawks is presented at such length that the voice and the man merge into a single, fascinating character in a way that is not possible in the other, shorter interviews... I did not always believe the director in Hawks on Hawks, but I found I always wanted to hear what the man had to say." In Cinéaste, Robert Sklar wrote that while Hawks's anecdotes should be taken with a grain of salt, the book "is the most detailed look we are likely to have at the self-created persona of this quintessential Hollywood director, and there are numerous insights into such subjects as working with actors and surviving in the Hollywood system." David Thomson, an admirer of Hawks, used the quote "The great problem is people trying to be funny. If they don't try to be funny, they are funny" as an epigraph for the fifth edition of The New Biographical Dictionary of Film, citing McBride. Reviewing the book in Film Comment, Kathleen Murphy wrote that Hawks's "anecdotes are as entertaining, as sporadically informative and provocative, as ever" but says McBride's questions lack the insight seen in François Truffaut's interviews with Hitchcock. Truffaut himself, who was partly responsible for McBride writing the book, said "I read Hawks on Hawks with passion. I am very happy that this book exists." Hawks said he appreciated the recognition he received from French filmmakers, and in El Dorado he paid homage to Truffaut when a gunsmith tells someone to shoot the piano player.

== See also ==
- Hitchcock/Truffaut, a book-length interview between François Truffaut and Alfred Hitchcock
- This is Orson Welles, a book of interviews between Peter Bogdanovich and Orson Welles
