= Kenneth Keith, Baron Keith of Castleacre =

British financier (1916–2004)

The Right Honourable The Lord Keith of Castleacre
- Born: Kenneth Alexander Keith; 30 August 1916
- Died: 1 September 2004 (aged 88)
- Spouses: Slim Hawks (m. 1962–1972) Penelope de László (née Steele) (m. 2002)

Member of the House of Lords
- Lord Temporal
- Life peerage 6 February 1980 – 1 September 2004

Kenneth Alexander Keith, Baron Keith of Castleacre (30 August 1916 – 1 September 2004) was a British businessman and banker.

Keith was knighted in the 1969 Queen's Birthday Honours List and was created a life peer as Baron Keith of Castleacre, of Swaffham in the County of Norfolk on 6 February 1980.

He presided over the mergers that formed the British merchant bank Hill Samuel, and also chaired Rolls-Royce after the company's receivership and subsequent nationalisation in 1971, helping to organise the recovery of the RB211 project. After retiring from those chairmanships in 1980 he was chairman of STC and of Beecham.

"We (Rolls-Royce) added a zero to his stature; he used to think £5 million a lot of money, but after a few weeks on the RB211 he came to understand that £50 million is peanuts." – Stanley Hooker.

Coat of arms of Kenneth Keith, Baron Keith of Castleacre
Coronet Coronet of a baron Crest A Garb Or supported by two Stags respectant proper Escutcheon Paly of six Or and Gules on a Chief Argent three Stags' Heads caboshed proper Supporters Dexter: a Foreman proper his Overall Argent charged on the breast pocket with a Monogram composed of the Letters RR superimposed one above the other with above the word Rolls and beneath the word Royce all in capital letters Gules the Collar Azure holding in his outer hand a Worksheet in its Folder proper; Sinister: a Farmer in Plus-Four Suit and Cap of Brown Tweed with heather mixture Stockings and Brown Boots holding in the crook of his outer arms a Shot Gun proper Motto Veritas Vincit (Truth conquers)
