= Kitty Hawks =

Daughter of Slim Keith and Howard Hawks

- Born: Kitty Stephen Hawks; February 11, 1946 (age 80)
- Education: University of California, Los Angeles; Smith College
- Occupation: Interior designer
- Spouse(s): Ned Tanen (m. 1976; div. 1983) Larry Lederman
- Parent(s): Howard Hawks (father); Slim Keith (mother)

Kitty Stephen Hawks (born February 11, 1946) is an American interior designer living in New York City and Westchester, New York. She is the daughter of New York socialite Slim Keith and film director Howard Hawks and is married to Larry Lederman, a photographer and retired corporate attorney. She was previously married to Ned Tanen from April 11, 1976, to December 30, 1983.

== Career ==
Hawks graduated from Smith College and attended the School of Architecture and Urban Planning at the University of California, Los Angeles. After working as an agent for International Creative Management in Los Angeles, she moved to New York City, where she worked as creative director for Perry Ellis and Stendig Furniture before starting her own interior design firm. She was first commissioned in 1988 to decorate an apartment in New York's Hotel des Artistes. Since then her clients have included Tom Brokaw, Candice Bergen, Agnes Gund, Michael Ovitz, Mike Nichols, and Diane Sawyer. She served for over 10 years as a board member of the Design Trust for Public Space and the Municipal Art Society of New York. She has taught residential design at the Parsons School of Interior Design, and was inducted into the Interior Design Hall of Fame in 2005. Hawks could be seen as unpredictable, as she told Interior Design magazine: “My work isn’t premeditated, it’s very spontaneous.”

== Awards ==
- Interior Design Hall of Fame 2005
