= Twentieth Century (film) =

1934 film by Howard Hawks

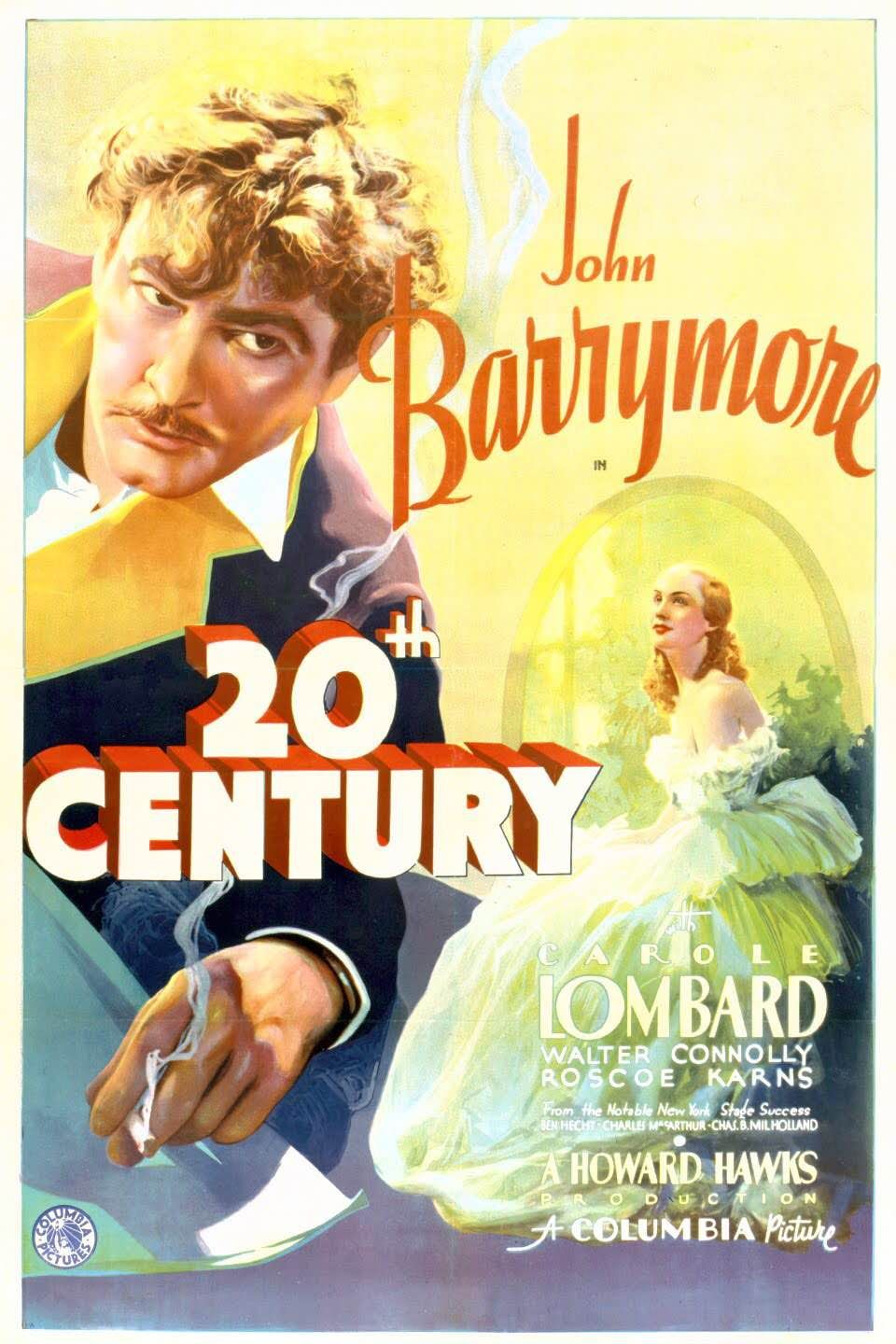
- Theatrical release poster
- Directed by: Howard Hawks
- Written by: Ben Hecht; Charles MacArthur
- Based on: Napoleon of Broadway; 1932 play by Charles Bruce Millholland
- Produced by: Howard Hawks
- Starring: John Barrymore; Carole Lombard; Walter Connolly; Roscoe Karns
- Cinematography: Joseph August
- Edited by: Gene Havlick
- Production company: Columbia Pictures
- Distributed by: Columbia Pictures
- Release date: May 11, 1934
- Running time: 91 minutes
- Country: United States
- Language: English

Twentieth Century is a 1934 American pre-Code screwball comedy film directed by Howard Hawks and starring John Barrymore, Carole Lombard, Walter Connolly, and Roscoe Karns. Much of the film is set on the 20th Century Limited train as it travels from Chicago to New York City. Ben Hecht and Charles MacArthur adapted their 1932 Broadway play of the same name—itself based on the unproduced play Napoleon of Broadway by Charles Bruce Millholland—with uncredited contributions from Gene Fowler and Preston Sturges.

Along with Frank Capra's It Happened One Night, also released in 1934 (which coincidentally has the same music over the opening titles), Twentieth Century is considered to be a prototype for the screwball comedy. "Howard Hawks' rapid-fire romantic comedy established the essential ingredients of the screwball – a dizzy dame, a charming, but befuddled, hero, dazzling dialogue, and a dash of slapstick." Its success propelled Lombard into the front ranks of film comediennes. The film was selected for preservation in the National Film Registry of the Library of Congress in 2011.

== Plot ==
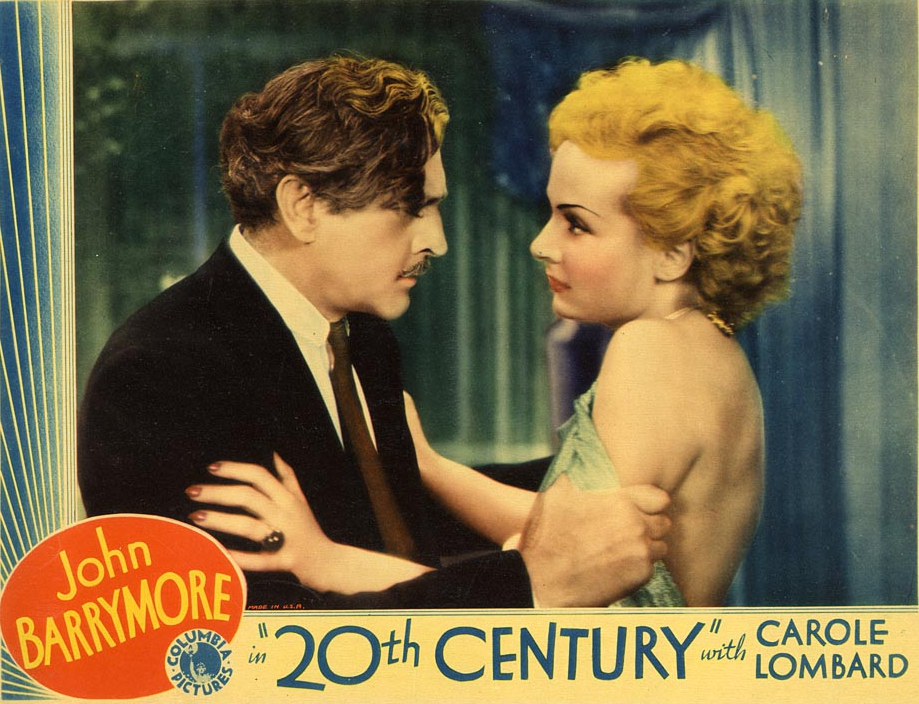
Lobby card for Twentieth Century

Ebullient Broadway impresario Oscar Jaffe takes an unknown lingerie model named Mildred Plotka and makes her the star of his latest play, despite the grave misgivings of everyone else, including his two long-suffering assistants, accountant Oliver Webb and the consistently tipsy Owen O'Malley. Through intensive training, Oscar transforms his protégée into the actress "Lily Garland", and both she and the play are resounding successes. On opening night, after her triumph, he comes to her dressing room to apologize abjectly for his behavior to her. As planned, she falls into his arms, begging him never to leave her, and they become lovers.

Their partnership has spawned three more smash hits three years later, and Lily has been recognized as a transcendent talent. As a couple, they are famous—or infamous—for their spectacular battles.

Lily tries to break off their professional and personal relationship, fed up with Oscar's jealousy and control of every aspect of her life. Oscar talks her out of it, promising to be more trusting and less controlling in the future. Instead, he secretly hires a private detective agency run by McGonigle to watch her every move, even to the point of tapping her telephone. When she finds out, it is the last straw; she leaves for Hollywood and soon becomes a successful film star.

Without Lily, Oscar produces flop after flop. After one such disappointment, to avoid being imprisoned for his debts, he is forced to disguise himself to board the luxurious 20th Century Limited express train traveling from Chicago to New York City's Grand Central Terminal. By chance, Lily boards the train at a later stop with her boyfriend George Smith. After prevaricating, Oscar sees a chance to restore his fortunes and salvage his relationship with Lily.

Oscar gets George to break up with Lily by revealing that he was once her lover. Knowing that Lily offers him one last chance at professional success, Oscar schemes to get her to sign a contract with him. He tells her of his wish for her to play Mary Magdalene in his new Passion Play, describing the role to her: "Sensual, heartless, but beautiful. Running the gamut from the gutter, to glory. Can you see her, Lily? This little wanton ending up in tears at the foot of the cross. I'm going to have Judas strangle himself with her hair." However, Lily wants nothing more to do with him, as she is on her way to sign with Oscar's rival (and former employee), Max Jacobs. Meanwhile, Oliver thinks he has found a financial backer for Oscar's project, fellow passenger Mathew J. Clark, not realizing that Clark is a harmless escapee from a mental asylum. When Oscar is slightly wounded in a scuffle with Clark, he pretends to be dying and gets a distraught Lily to sign his contract. At their first rehearsal, Oscar reverts to his usual self, domineering a desperate Lily.

== Cast ==
- John Barrymore as Oscar Jaffe
- Carole Lombard as Lily Garland (formerly Mildred Plotka)
- Walter Connolly as Oliver Webb
- Roscoe Karns as Owen O'Malley
- Ralph Forbes as George Smith
- Charles Levison as Max Jacobs
- Etienne Girardot as Mathew J. Clark
- Dale Fuller as Sadie
- Edgar Kennedy as Oscar McGonigle
- Billie Seward as Anita
- Charles Lane (actor, born 1905) as Max Jacobs

== Production ==
The genesis of Twentieth Century was Napoleon of Broadway, a play by Charles Bruce Millholland about his experiences in working for Broadway producer David Belasco. His play was not produced, but it became the basis for the Hecht–MacArthur comedy, which lasted for 152 performances on Broadway, beginning on December 29, 1932, and which they later adapted for the big screen. Howard Hawks was not the first choice; Roy Del Ruth and Lewis Milestone had been set to direct before Hawks got the job. Columbia tried to get William Frawley from the Broadway cast, but instead borrowed Roscoe Karns from Paramount Pictures.

Before Lombard was cast, Columbia boss Harry Cohn negotiated with Eugenie Leontovich, who had played the part on Broadway, and then considered Gloria Swanson and Miriam Hopkins. Other reports say that Ina Claire, Tallulah Bankhead, Ruth Chatterton, Constance Bennett, Ann Harding, Kay Francis, and Joan Crawford were also considered for the lead role by Cohn and Hawks. However, Hawks believed that Lombard was a brilliant actress who had yet to be unleashed on film. He convinced a reluctant Columbia to borrow her from Paramount.

During Barrymore's initial reading with her, he looked to Hawks with an expression that showed he did not share Hawks's intuition. The rest of the production went dryly, with Lombard staggering through one scene after another and playing the same stoic characters that she had been taught to portray. Hawks took her aside and asked her what she was being paid for the film. Lombard told him and Hawks asked her what she would do if a man said "something" about her, coming up with an example from the back of his mind. Lombard said, "I would kick him in the balls." Hawks said, "Well, Barrymore said that, so why don't you kick him?" Of course Barrymore had said nothing of the sort, but the plan worked and after Lombard yelped a few profanities, she continued through the shoot with an unforgettable vigor. For the remainder of her career—until her tragic death in an airplane crash in 1942 at age 33—before beginning a film, Lombard would always send a telegram to Hawks saying, "I'm going to kick him!"

Lombard and Barrymore became friends during filming. When Barrymore's career was declining, Lombard raised hell to get him to work on her film True Confession (1937).

Preston Sturges was hired to write the screenplay around late November 1933, but was removed from the project a week later because he had not made sufficient progress. Columbia then tried to get Herman Mankiewicz to write it, with Felix Young to produce.

Twentieth Century—a title which Columbia considered changing because they feared that many westerners would not be familiar with the name of the train—was in production from February 22 to March 24, 1934.

During the filming, there were some problems with the censors at the Hays Office, who were concerned about the religious angle in the comedy of the film, and requested that it be toned down. Joseph Breen, who ran the Office, worried that "there will be serious difficulty in inducing an anti-Semitic public to accept a [motion picture] play produced by an industry believed to be Jewish in which the Passion Play is used for comedy purposes." The Office ultimately asked that one line be removed, which it was. They also requested that it be made less clear where Oscar jabs Lily with a pin.

Twentieth Century was premiered at Radio City Music Hall in New York City on May 3, 1934, and went into general release on May 11.

== Reception ==
In his The New York Times review of Twentieth Century, Mordaunt Hall wrote, "John Barrymore is in fine fettle in Twentieth Century" and "acts with such imagination and zest that he never fails to keep the picture thoroughly alive." All of the principal actors—Lombard ("gives an able portrayal"), Connolly ("excellent"), and Karns ("adds bright flashes"), as well as Girardot ("an asset")—were also praised. However, Hall was less enthused about the comedy style, stating, "it seems a pity that they [Hecht and MacArthur] were tempted to stray occasionally too far from the realm of restrained comedy and indulge their fancy for boisterous humor." The movie premiered at the Radio City Music Hall.

Pauline Kael was enthusiastic: "A first-rate hardboiled farce about theatrical personalities. John Barrymore was a great farceur, and his performance as the egomaniac producer Oscar Jaffe is a roaring caricature ... It was Carole Lombard's performance ... that established her as a comedienne ...The script, by Hecht and MacArthur ... is freely, carelessly irreverent ... Howard Hawks directed in a fast, entertaining style ...." Leonard Maltin gave it four of four stars: "Super screwball comedy ... Barrymore has never been funnier, and Connolly and Karns are aces as his long-suffering cronies." Leslie Halliwell gave it two of four stars: " ... this is a marvellously sharp and memorable theatrical burlesque, and the second half, set on the train of the title, reaches highly agreeable peaks of insanity."

Twentieth Century's box office performance was described as "dismal". It was a box office disappointment.

Time magazine said, "Twentieth Century is good fun, slick, wild and improbable."

On the review aggregator website Rotten Tomatoes, the film holds an approval rating of 86% based on 29 reviews, with an average rating of 7.5/10.

In December 2011, Twentieth Century was deemed "culturally, historically, or aesthetically significant" by the United States Library of Congress and selected for preservation in the National Film Registry. In its induction, the Registry said that the "sophisticated farce about the tempestuous romance of an egocentic impresario and the star he creates did not fare well on its release, but has come to be recognized as one of the era's finest film comedies, one that gave John Barrymore his last great film role and Carole Lombard her first."

== Adaptations ==
=== On the Twentieth Century ===
In 1978, Cy Coleman (music), Betty Comden and Adolph Green (book and lyrics) created the stage musical On the Twentieth Century, based on the film, the original Hecht and MacArthur play and the unpublished play by Millholland. It ran on Broadway for 460 performances, and was revived for a special benefit performance on September 26, 2005. Its first full-scale Broadway revival officially began in March 2015, with Peter Gallagher and Kristin Chenoweth in the lead roles.

=== Radio ===
Twentieth Century was presented on Star Playhouse on November 22, 1953. The adaptation starred Lilli Palmer and Rex Harrison, who were married in real life.
