= Howard Hawks =

American film director (1896–1977)

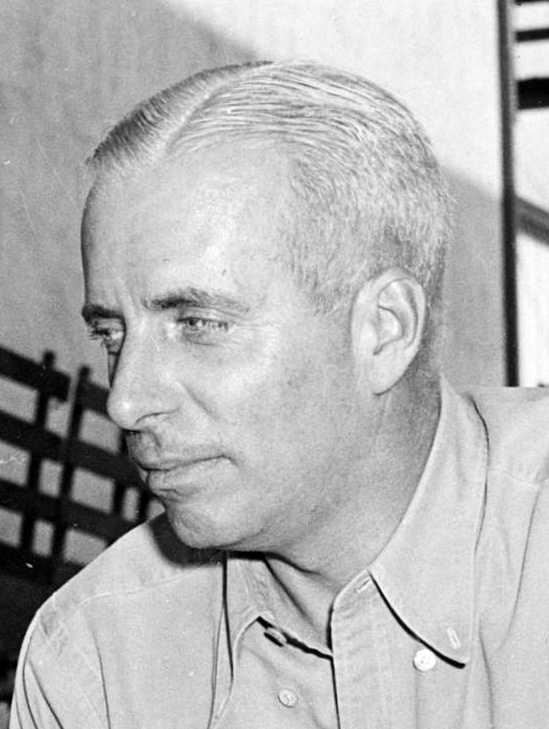
- Hawks in the 1940s
- Born: Howard Winchester Hawks; May 30, 1896; Goshen, Indiana, U.S.
- Died: December 26, 1977 (aged 81); Palm Springs, California, U.S.
- Education: Cornell University
- Occupations: Film director; producer; screenwriter
- Years active: 1916–1970
- Notable work: Scarface; Bringing Up Baby; Only Angels Have Wings; His Girl Friday; Ball of Fire; To Have and Have Not; The Big Sleep; Red River; Gentlemen Prefer Blondes; Rio Bravo
- Spouses: Athole Shearer (m. 1928; div. 1940) Slim Keith (m. 1941; div. 1949) Dee Hartford (m. 1953; div. 1959)
- Children: 4, including Kitty Hawks
- Relatives: Kenneth Hawks (brother); William Hawks (brother); Mary Astor (sister-in-law); Bessie Love (sister-in-law)

Howard Winchester Hawks (May 30, 1896 – December 26, 1977) was an American film director, producer, and screenwriter of the classic Hollywood era. The critic Leonard Maltin called him "the greatest American director who is not a household name." Roger Ebert called Hawks "one of the greatest American directors of pure movies, and a hero of auteur critics because he found his own laconic values in so many different kinds of genre material." He was nominated for the Academy Award for Best Director for Sergeant York (1941) and earned the Honorary Academy Award in 1974.

A versatile director, Hawks explored many genres such as comedies, dramas, gangster films, science fiction, film noir, war films and Westerns. His most popular films include Scarface (1932), Bringing Up Baby (1938), Only Angels Have Wings (1939), His Girl Friday (1940), To Have and Have Not (1944), The Big Sleep (1946), Red River (1948), The Thing from Another World (1951), Gentlemen Prefer Blondes (1953), and Rio Bravo (1959). His frequent portrayals of strong, tough-talking female characters came to define the "Hawksian woman".

His work has influenced such directors as Peter Bogdanovich, Martin Scorsese, Robert Altman, John Carpenter, Rainer Werner Fassbinder, Clint Eastwood, Quentin Tarantino, Greta Gerwig, and Michael Mann. Entertainment Weekly placed Hawks fourth on their list of greatest directors, writing: "His hallmarks are more thematic than visual: men who adhere to an understated code of manliness; women who like to yank the rug out from under those men's feet; a mistrust of pomposity; a love of sly, leg-pulling wit. Yet there's the ease of the complete filmmaker in his Westerns, dramas, musicals, detective films, and supremely confident comedies. No wonder the French adored the guy: His casual profundity was the studio's best advertisement for itself." Jean-Luc Godard called him "the greatest of all American artists".

== Early life and background ==
Howard Winchester Hawks was born in Goshen, Indiana. He was the first-born child of Frank Winchester Hawks (1865–1950), a wealthy paper manufacturer, and his wife, Helen Brown (née Howard; 1872–1952), the daughter of a wealthy industrialist. Hawks's family on his father's side were American pioneers, and his ancestor John Hawks had emigrated from England to Massachusetts in 1630. The family eventually settled in Goshen and, by the 1890s, was one of the wealthiest families in the Midwest, due mostly to the highly profitable Goshen Milling Company.

Hawks's maternal grandfather, C. W. Howard (1845–1916), had homesteaded in Neenah, Wisconsin, in 1862 at age 17. Within 15 years, he had made his fortune in the town's paper mill and other industrial endeavors. Frank Hawks and Helen Howard met in the early 1890s and married in 1895. Howard Hawks was the eldest of five children, and his birth was followed by Kenneth Neil Hawks (August 12, 1898 – January 2, 1930), William Bellinger Hawks (January 29, 1901 – January 10, 1969), Grace Louise Hawks (October 17, 1903 – December 23, 1927), and Helen Bernice Hawks (1906 – May 4, 1911). In 1898, the family moved back to Neenah where Frank Hawks began working for his father-in-law's Howard Paper Company.

Between 1906 and 1909, the Hawks family began to spend more time in Pasadena, California, during the cold Wisconsin winters in order to improve Helen Hawks's ill health. Gradually, they began to spend only their summers in Wisconsin before permanently moving to Pasadena in 1910. The family settled in a house down the street from Throop Polytechnic Institute, and the Hawks children began attending the school's Polytechnic Elementary School in 1907. Hawks was an average student and did not excel in sports, but by 1910 had discovered coaster racing, an early form of soapbox racing. In 1911, Hawks's youngest sibling, Helen, died suddenly of food poisoning. From 1910 to 1912, Hawks attended Pasadena High School. In 1912, the Hawks family moved to nearby Glendora, California, where Frank Hawks owned orange groves. Hawks finished his junior year of high school at Citrus Union High School in Glendora. During this time he worked as a barnstorming pilot.

He was sent to Phillips Exeter Academy in New Hampshire from 1913 to 1914; his family's wealth may have influenced his acceptance to the elite private school. Even though he was 17, he was admitted as a lower middleclassman, the equivalent of a sophomore. While in New England, Hawks often attended the theaters in nearby Boston. In 1914, Hawks returned to Glendora and graduated from Pasadena High School that year. Skilled in tennis, Hawks won the United States Junior Tennis Championship at the age of 18. That same year, Hawks was accepted to Cornell University in Ithaca, New York, where he majored in mechanical engineering and was a member of Delta Kappa Epsilon. His college friend Ray S. Ashbury remembered Hawks spending more of his time playing craps and drinking alcohol than studying, although Hawks was also known to be a voracious reader of popular American and English novels while in college.

While working in the film industry during his 1916 summer vacation, Hawks made an unsuccessful attempt to transfer to Stanford University. He returned to Cornell that September, leaving in April 1917 to join the Army when the United States entered World War I. He served as a lieutenant in the Aviation Section, U.S. Signal Corps. During World War I, he taught aviators to fly, and these experiences influenced future aviation films like The Dawn Patrol (1930). Like many college students who joined the armed services during the war, he received a degree in absentia in 1918. Before Hawks was called for active duty, he returned to Hollywood and, by the end of April 1917, was working on a Cecil B. DeMille film.

== Career ==
=== Entering films (1916–1925) ===
Howard Hawks's interest and passion for aviation led him to many important experiences and acquaintances. In 1916, Hawks met Victor Fleming, a Hollywood cinematographer who had been an auto mechanic and early aviator. Hawks had begun racing and working on a Mercer race car—bought for him by his grandfather C.W. Howard—during his 1916 summer vacation in California. He allegedly met Fleming when the two men raced on a dirt track and caused an accident. This meeting led to Hawks's first job in the film industry, as a prop boy on the Douglas Fairbanks film In Again, Out Again (on which Fleming was employed as the cinematographer) for Famous Players–Lasky. According to Hawks, a new set needed to be built quickly when the studio's set designer was unavailable, so Hawks volunteered to do the job himself, much to Fairbanks' satisfaction. He was next employed as a prop boy and general assistant on an unspecified film directed by Cecil B. DeMille. (Hawks never named the film in later interviews, and DeMille made roughly five films in that time period). By the end of April 1917, Hawks was working on Cecil B. DeMille's The Little American. Hawks worked on Marshall Neilan's The Little Princess, starring Mary Pickford. According to Hawks, Neilan did not show up to work one day, so the resourceful Hawks offered to direct a scene himself, to which Pickford consented. Hawks began directing at age 21 after he and cinematographer Charles Rosher filmed a double exposure dream sequence Pickford.

Hawks worked with Pickford and Neilan again on Amarilly of Clothes-Line Alley before joining the United States Army Air Service. Hawks's military records were destroyed in the 1973 Military Archive Fire, so the only account of his military service is his own. According to Hawks, he spent 15 weeks in basic training at the University of California, Berkeley where he was trained to be a squadron commander in the Air Service. When Pickford visited Hawks at basic training, his superior officers were so impressed by the appearance of the celebrity that they promoted him to flight instructor and sent him to Texas to teach new recruits. Bored by this work, Hawks attempted to secure a transfer during the first half of 1918; eventually, he was sent to Fort Monroe, Virginia. The Armistice was signed in November of that year, and Hawks was discharged as a Second Lieutenant without having seen active duty.

After the war, Hawks was eager to return to Hollywood. His brother, Kenneth Hawks, who had also served in the Air Service, graduated from Yale in 1919, and the two of them moved to Hollywood together to pursue their careers. They quickly made friends with Hollywood insider Allan Dwan. Hawks landed his first important job when he used his family's wealth to loan money to studio head Jack L. Warner. Warner quickly paid back the loan and hired Hawks as a producer to "oversee" the making of a new series of one-reel comedies starring the Italian comedian Monty Banks. Hawks later stated that he personally directed "three or four" of the shorts, though no documentation exists to confirm the claim. The films were profitable, but Hawks soon left to form his own production company using his family's wealth and connections to secure financing. The production company, Associated Producers, was a joint venture among Hawks, Allan Dwan, Marshall Neilan, and director Allen Holubar, with a distribution deal with First National. The company made 14 films between 1920 and 1923, with eight directed by Neilan, three by Dwan, and three by Holubar. More of a "boy's club" than a production company, the four men gradually drifted apart and went their separate ways in 1923, by which time Hawks had decided that he wanted to direct rather than produce.

Beginning in early 1920, Hawks lived in rented houses in Hollywood with the group of friends he was accumulating. This rowdy group of mostly macho, risk-taking men included his brother Kenneth, Victor Fleming, Jack Conway, Harold Rosson, Richard Rosson, Arthur Rosson, and Eddie Sutherland. During this time, Hawks first met Irving Thalberg, the vice-president in charge of production at Metro-Goldwyn-Mayer. Hawks admired his intelligence and sense of story. Hawks also became friends with barnstormers and pioneer aviators at Rogers Airport in Los Angeles, getting to know men like Moye Stephens.

In 1923, Famous Players–Lasky president Jesse Lasky was looking for a new Production Editor in the story department of his studio, and Thalberg suggested Hawks. Hawks accepted, and he immediately was put in charge of over 40 productions, including several literary acquisitions of stories by Joseph Conrad, Jack London, and Zane Grey. Hawks worked on the scripts for all of the films produced, but he had his first official screenplay credit in 1924 on Tiger Love. Hawks was the Story Editor at Famous Players (later Paramount Pictures) for almost two years, occasionally editing such films as Heritage of the Desert. Hawks signed a new one-year contract with Famous-Players in the fall of 1924. He broke his contract to become a story editor for Thalberg at MGM, having secured a promise from Thalberg to make him a director within a year. In 1925, when Thalberg hesitated to keep his promise, Hawks broke his contract at MGM and left.

=== Silent films (1925–1929) ===
In October 1925, Sol Wurtzel, William Fox's studio superintendent at the Fox Film Corporation, invited Hawks to join his company with the promise of letting him direct. Over the next three years, Hawks directed his first eight films (six silent, two "talkies"). Hawks reworked the scripts of most of the films that he directed without always taking official credit for his work. He also worked on the scripts for Honesty – The Best Policy in 1926 and Joseph von Sternberg's Underworld in 1927, famous for being one of the first gangster films. Hawks's first film was The Road to Glory, which premiered in April 1926. The screenplay was based on a 35-page composition written by Hawks, making it one of the only films on which Hawks had extensive writing credit. Today, it is one of Hawks's two lost films.

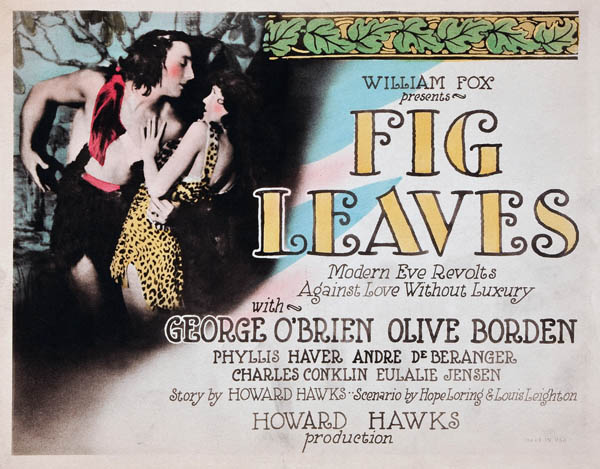
Poster for the comedy Fig Leaves (1926), one of the few early films that Hawks valued positively later in his life.

Immediately after completing The Road to Glory, Hawks began writing his next film, Fig Leaves, his first (and, until 1935, only) comedy. It received positive reviews, particularly for the art direction and costume designs. It was released in July 1926 and was Hawks's first hit as a director. Although he mainly dismissed his early work, Hawks praised this film in later interviews.

Paid to Love is notable in Hawks's filmography because it was a highly stylized, experimental film, à la German director F. W. Murnau. Hawks's film includes atypical tracking shots, expressionistic lighting, and stylistic film editing that was inspired by German expressionist cinema. In a later interview, Hawks commented, "It isn't my type of stuff, at least I got it over in a hurry. You know the idea of wanting the camera to do those things: Now the camera's somebody's eyes." Hawks worked on the script with Seton I. Miller, with whom he would go on to collaborate on seven more films. The film stars George O'Brien as the introverted Crown Prince Michael, William Powell as his happy-go-lucky brother, and Virginia Valli as Michael's flapper love interest, Dolores. The characters played by Valli and O'Brien anticipate those found in later films by Hawks: a sexually aggressive showgirl, who is an early prototype of the "Hawksian woman", and a shy man disinterested in sex, found in later roles played by Cary Grant and Gary Cooper. Paid to Love was completed by September 1926, but it remained unreleased until July 1927. It was financially unsuccessful. Cradle Snatchers was based on a 1925 hit stage play by Russell G. Medcraft and Norma Mitchell. The film was shot in early 1927, released in May 1927, and was a minor hit. It was believed to be lost until Peter Bogdanovich discovered a print in 20th Century Fox's film vaults, although it was missing part of reel three and all of reel four. In March 1927, Hawks signed a new one-year, three-picture contract with Fox and was assigned to direct Fazil, based on the play L'Insoumise by Pierre Frondaie. Hawks again worked with Seton Miller on the script. Hawks was over schedule and over budget on the film, which began a rift between him and Sol Wurtzel that eventually led to Hawks leaving Fox. The film was finished in August 1927, though it was not released until June 1928.

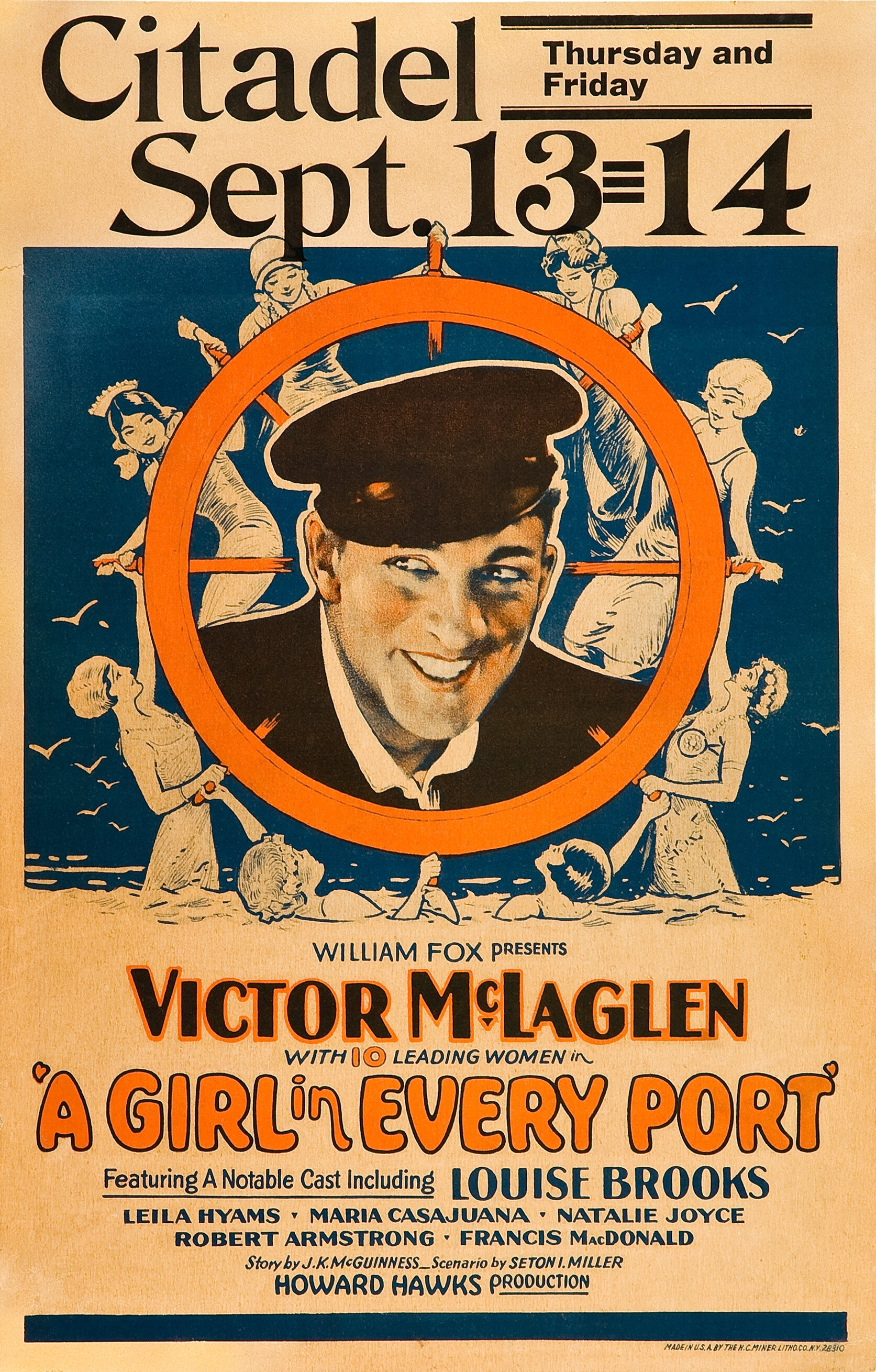
A Girl in Every Port poster

A Girl in Every Port is considered by scholars to be the most important of Hawks's silent films. It is the first to feature many of the themes and archetypes that would define much of his subsequent work. It was his first "love story between two men", with two men bonding over their duty, skills, and careers, who consider their friendship to be more important than their relationships with women. In France, Henri Langlois called Hawks "the Gropius of the cinema" and Swiss novelist and poet Blaise Cendrars said that the film "definitely marked the first appearance of contemporary cinema." Hawks went over budget once again with this film, and his relationship with Sol Wurtzel deteriorated. After an advance screening that received positive reviews, Wurtzel told Hawks, "This is the worst picture Fox has made in years." After seeing Louise Brooks in A Girl in Every Port, G. W. Pabst cast her in Pandora's Box (1929). The Air Circus was Hawks's first film centered around aviation, one of his early passions. In 1928, Charles Lindbergh was the world's most famous person and Wings was one of the most popular films of the year. Wanting to capitalize on the country's aviation craze, Fox immediately bought Hawks's original story for The Air Circus, a variation of the theme of male friendship about two young pilots. The film was shot from April to June 1928, but Fox ordered an additional 15 minutes of dialogue footage so that the film could compete with the new talkies being released. Hawks hated the new dialogue written by Hugh Herbert, and he refused to participate in the re-shoots. It was released in September 1928, was a moderate hit, and is one of two Hawks films that are lost.

Trent's Last Case is an adaptation of E. C. Bentley's 1913 novel of the same name. Hawks considered the novel to be "one of the greatest detective stories of all time" and was eager to make it his first sound film. He cast Raymond Griffith in the lead role of Phillip Trent. Griffith's throat had been damaged by poison gas during World War I, and his voice was a hoarse whisper, prompting Hawks to later state, "I thought he ought to be great in talking pictures because of that voice." However, after shooting only a few scenes, Fox shut Hawks down and ordered him to make a silent film, both because of Griffith's voice and because they only owned the legal rights to make a silent film. The film did have a musical score and synchronized sound effects but no dialogue. Due to the failing business of silent films, it was never released in the United States and only briefly screened in England, where critics hated it. The film was believed lost until the mid-1970s, and it was screened for the first time in the U.S. at a Hawks retrospective in 1974. Hawks was in attendance for the screening and attempted to have the only print of the film destroyed. Hawks's contract with Fox ended in May 1929, and he never again signed a long-term contract with a major studio. He managed to remain an independent producer-director for the rest of his long career.

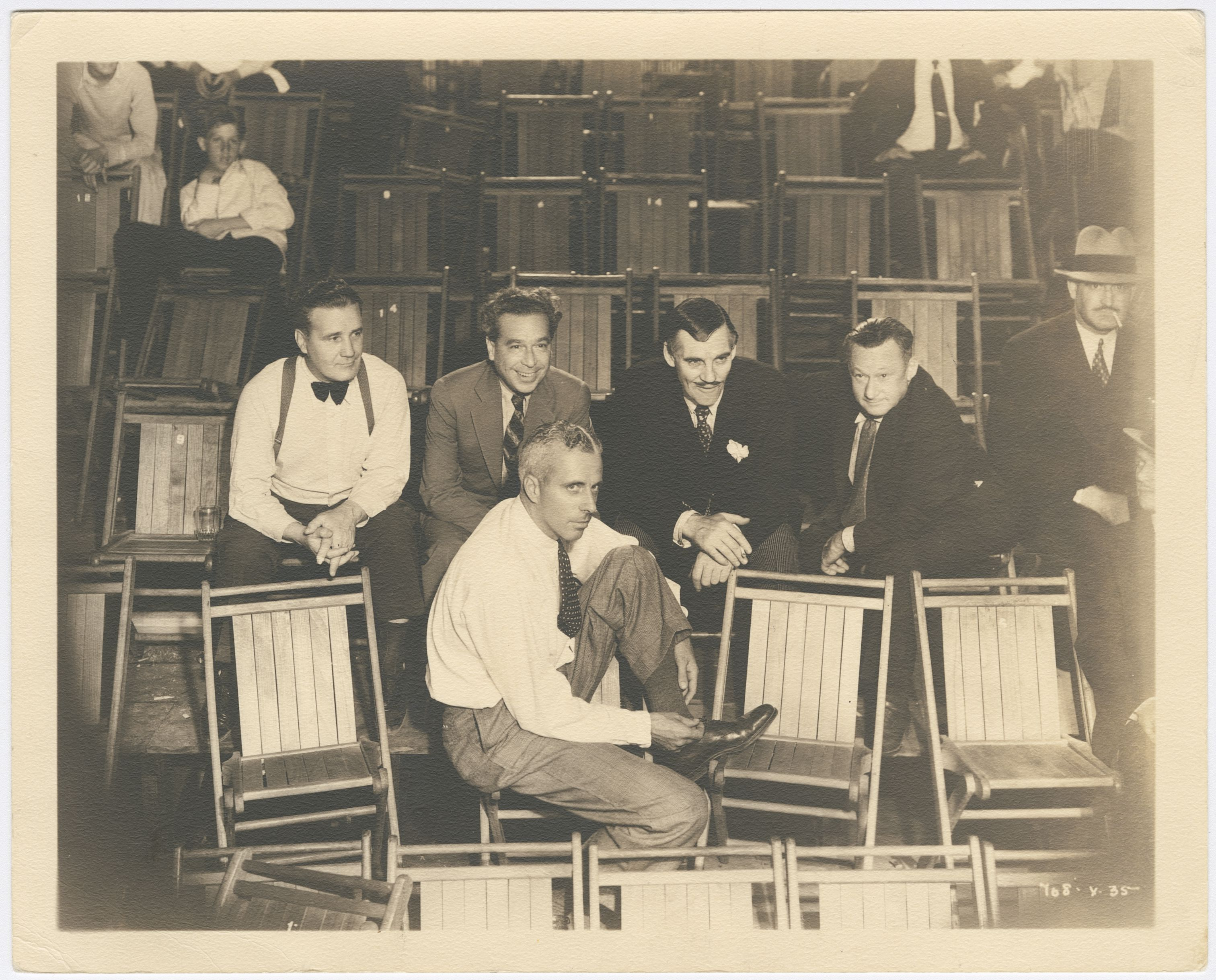
Howard Hawks in 1929 or 1930

=== Early sound films (1930–1934) ===
By 1930, Hollywood was in upheaval over the coming of "talkies", and the careers of many actors and directors were ruined. Hollywood studios were recruiting stage actors and directors that they believed were better suited for sound films. After working in the industry for 14 years and directing many financially successful films, Hawks found that he had to prove himself an asset to the studios once again. Leaving Fox on sour terms did not help his reputation, but Hawks never backed down from fights with studio heads. After several months of unemployment, Hawks renewed his career with his first sound film in 1930.

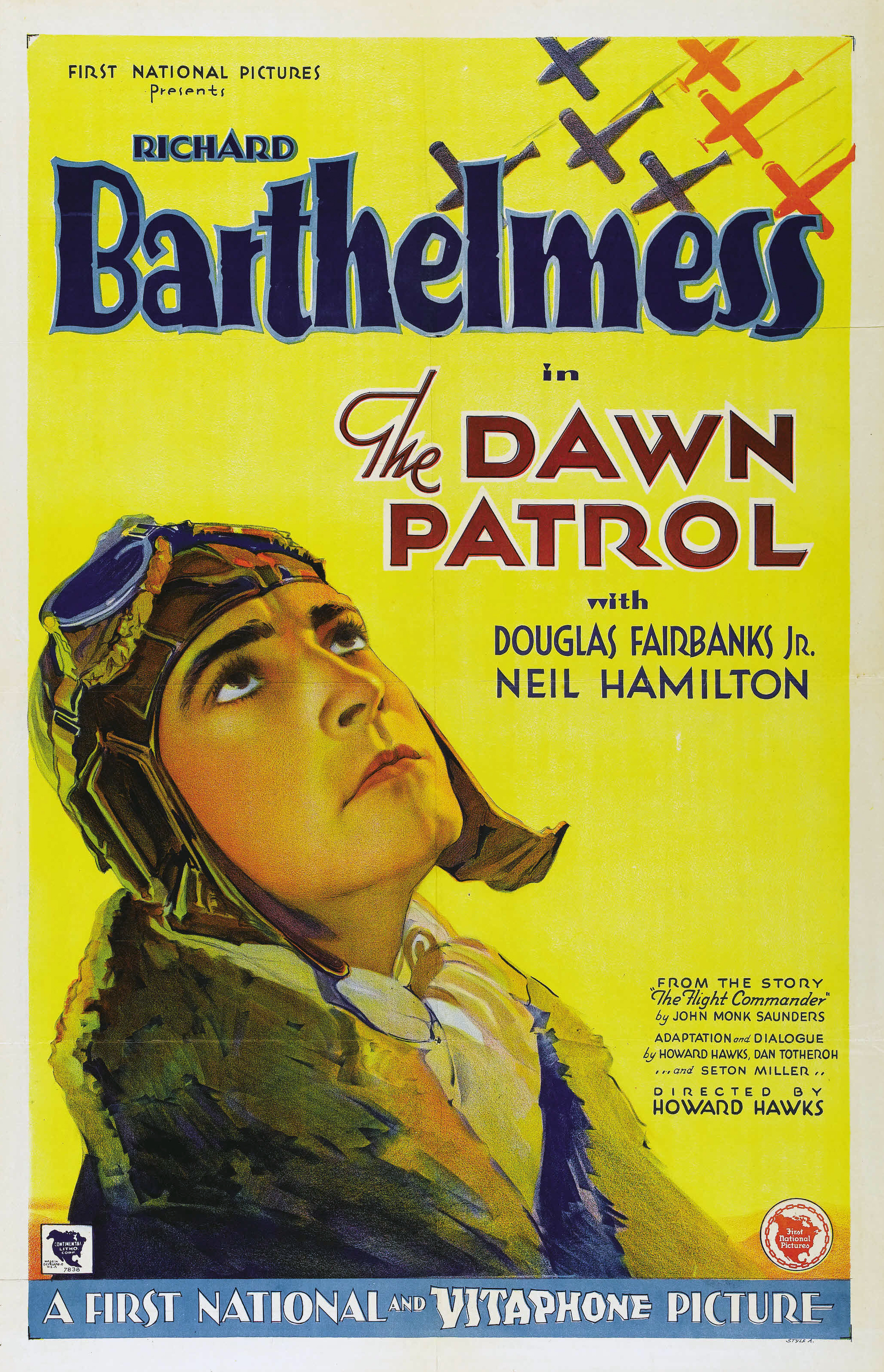
The Dawn Patrol movie poster

Hawks's first all-sound film was The Dawn Patrol, based on an original story by John Monk Saunders and (unofficially) Hawks. Reportedly, Hawks paid Saunders to put his name on the film so that Hawks could direct the film without arousing concern due to his lack of writing experience. Accounts vary on who came up with the idea for the film, but Hawks and Saunders developed the story together and tried to sell it to several studios before First National agreed to produce it. Shooting began in late February 1930, about the same time that Howard Hughes was finishing his World War I aviation epic Hell's Angels, which had been in production since September 1927. Shrewdly, Hawks began to hire many of the aviation experts and cameramen that had been employed by Hughes, including Elmer Dyer, Harry Reynolds, and Ira Reed. When Hughes found out about the rival film, he did everything he could to sabotage The Dawn Patrol. He harassed Hawks and other studio personnel, hired a spy that was quickly caught, and finally sued First National for copyright infringement. Hughes eventually dropped the lawsuit in late 1930—he and Hawks had become good friends during the legal battle. Filming was finished in late May 1930, and it premiered in July, setting a first-week box office record at the Winter Garden Theatre in New York. The film became one of the biggest hits of 1930. The success of this film allowed Hawks to gain respect in the field of filmmaking and allowed him to spend the rest of his career as an independent director without the necessity to sign any long-term contracts with specific studios.

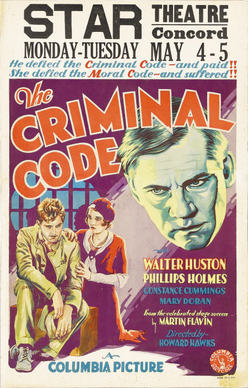
The Criminal Code poster

Hawks did not get along with Warner Brothers executive Hal B. Wallis, and his contract allowed him to be loaned out to other studios. Hawks took the opportunity to accept a directing offer from Harry Cohn at Columbia Pictures; this was The Criminal Code. The film opened in January 1931 and was a hit. The film was banned in Chicago, and experienced censorship, which would continue in his next film project. In 1930, Hughes hired Hawks to direct Scarface, a gangster film loosely based on the life of Chicago mobster Al Capone. The film was completed in September 1931, but the censorship of the Hays Code prevented it from being released as Hawks and Hughes had originally intended. The two men fought, negotiated, and made compromises with the Hays Office for over a year, until the film was eventually released in 1932, after such other pivotal early gangster films as The Public Enemy and Little Caesar. Scarface was the first film on which Hawks worked with screenwriter Ben Hecht, who became a close friend and collaborator for 20 years. After filming was complete on Scarface, Hawks left Hughes to fight the legal battles and returned to First National to fulfill his contract, this time with producer Darryl F. Zanuck. For his next film, Hawks wanted to make a film about his childhood passion: car racing. Hawks developed the script for The Crowd Roars with Seton Miller for their eighth and final collaboration. Hawks used real race car drivers in the film, including the 1930 Indianapolis 500 winner Billy Arnold. The film was released in March and became a hit.

Tiger Shark poster

Later in 1932, he directed Tiger Shark, starring Edward G. Robinson as a tuna fisherman. In these early films, Hawks established the prototypical "Hawksian Man", which film critic Andrew Sarris described as "upheld by an instinctive professionalism." Tiger Shark demonstrated Hawks's ability to incorporate touches of humor into dramatic, tense, and even tragic story lines. In 1933, Hawks signed a three-picture deal at Metro-Goldwyn-Mayer Studios, the first of which was Today We Live in 1933. This World War I film was based on a short story by William Faulkner. Hawks's next two films at MGM were the boxing drama The Prizefighter and the Lady and the bio-pic Viva Villa!. Studio interference on both films led Hawks to walk out on his MGM contract without completing either film himself.

=== Later sound films (1935–1970) ===
In 1934, Hawks went to Columbia Pictures to make Twentieth Century, starring John Barrymore and Hawks's distant cousin Carole Lombard. It was based on a stage play by Hecht and Charles MacArthur and, along with Frank Capra's It Happened One Night (released the same year), is considered to be the defining film of the screwball comedy genre. In 1935, Hawks made Barbary Coast with Edward G. Robinson and Miriam Hopkins. Hawks collaborated with Hecht and MacArthur on Barbary Coast and reportedly convinced them to work on the film by promising to teach them a marble game. They would switch off between working on the script and playing with marbles during work days. In 1936, he made the aviation adventure Ceiling Zero with James Cagney and Pat O'Brien. Also in 1936, Hawks began filming Come and Get It, starring Edward Arnold, Joel McCrea, Frances Farmer, and Walter Brennan, but he was fired by Samuel Goldwyn in the middle of shooting, and the film was completed by William Wyler.

In 1938, Hawks made the screwball comedy Bringing Up Baby for RKO Pictures. It starred Cary Grant and Katharine Hepburn and was adapted by Dudley Nichols and Hagar Wilde. Sarris called it "the screwiest of the screwball comedies". Grant plays a near-sighted paleontologist who suffers one humiliation after another due to the lovestruck socialite played by Hepburn. Hawks's artistic direction for Bringing Up Baby revolved around the raw natural chemistry between Grant and Hepburn. With Grant portraying the paleontologist and Hepburn as an heiress, the roles only add to the movie's purpose of disintegrating the line between the real and the imaginary. Bringing Up Baby was a box office flop when initially released and, subsequently, RKO fired Hawks due to extreme losses; however, the film has become regarded as one of Hawks's masterpieces. Regarding Hepburn, Hawks said: "We had trouble with Kate at first. The great trouble is people trying to be funny. If they don't try to be funny, then they are funny." Hawks followed it with 11 consecutive hits up to 1951, starting with the aviation drama Only Angels Have Wings, made in 1939 for Columbia Pictures and starring Grant, Jean Arthur, Thomas Mitchell, Rita Hayworth and Richard Barthelmess.

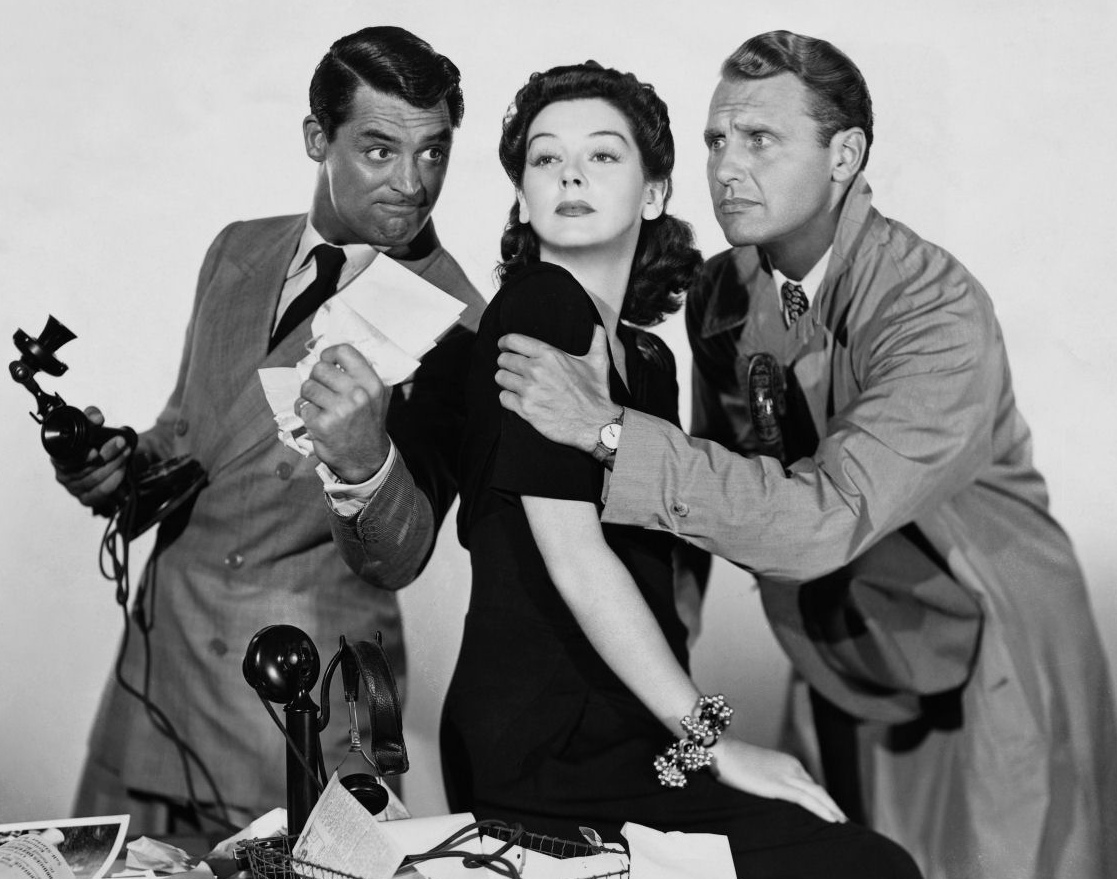
Cary Grant, Rosalind Russell, and Ralph Bellamy in His Girl Friday (1940)

Hawks returned to screwball comedy with His Girl Friday (1940), starring Grant and Rosalind Russell and featuring Ralph Bellamy. It was an adaptation of the Broadway hit The Front Page by Hecht and MacArthur, which had been made into a film in 1931. David Thomson writes that Hawks "turned The Front Page inside out – this is the first demolition re-make (a noble form). He said, suppose the editor and the reporter are a man and a woman, a married couple (just divorced), and the woman is on the point of leaving the paper to get married to a decent, wholesome, truthful idiot? Thus agreeable entertainment becomes ravishing art; thus a sentimental tribute to friendship becomes a frenzied rhapsody on the perils of being in love while guarding the love against all those plausibly 'real' things." Not forgetting the influence Jesse Lasky had on his early career, in 1941, Hawks made Sergeant York, starring Gary Cooper as a pacifist farmer who becomes a decorated World War I soldier. Hawks directed the film and cast Cooper as a specific favor to Lasky. This was the highest-grossing film of 1941 and won two Academy Awards, for Best Actor and Best Editing, as well as earning Hawks his only nomination for Best Director. Later that year, Hawks worked with Cooper again for Ball of Fire, which also starred Barbara Stanwyck. The film was written by Billy Wilder and Charles Brackett and is a playful take on Snow White and the Seven Dwarfs. Cooper plays a sheltered, intellectual linguist who is writing an encyclopedia with six other scientists and hires street-wise Stanwyck to help them with modern slang terms. In 1941, Hawks began work on the Howard Hughes-produced (and later directed) film The Outlaw, based on the life of Billy the Kid and starring Jane Russell. Hawks completed initial shooting of the film in early 1941, but due to perfectionism and battles with the Hollywood Production Code, Hughes continued to re-shoot and re-edit the film until 1943, when it was finally released with Hawks uncredited as director.

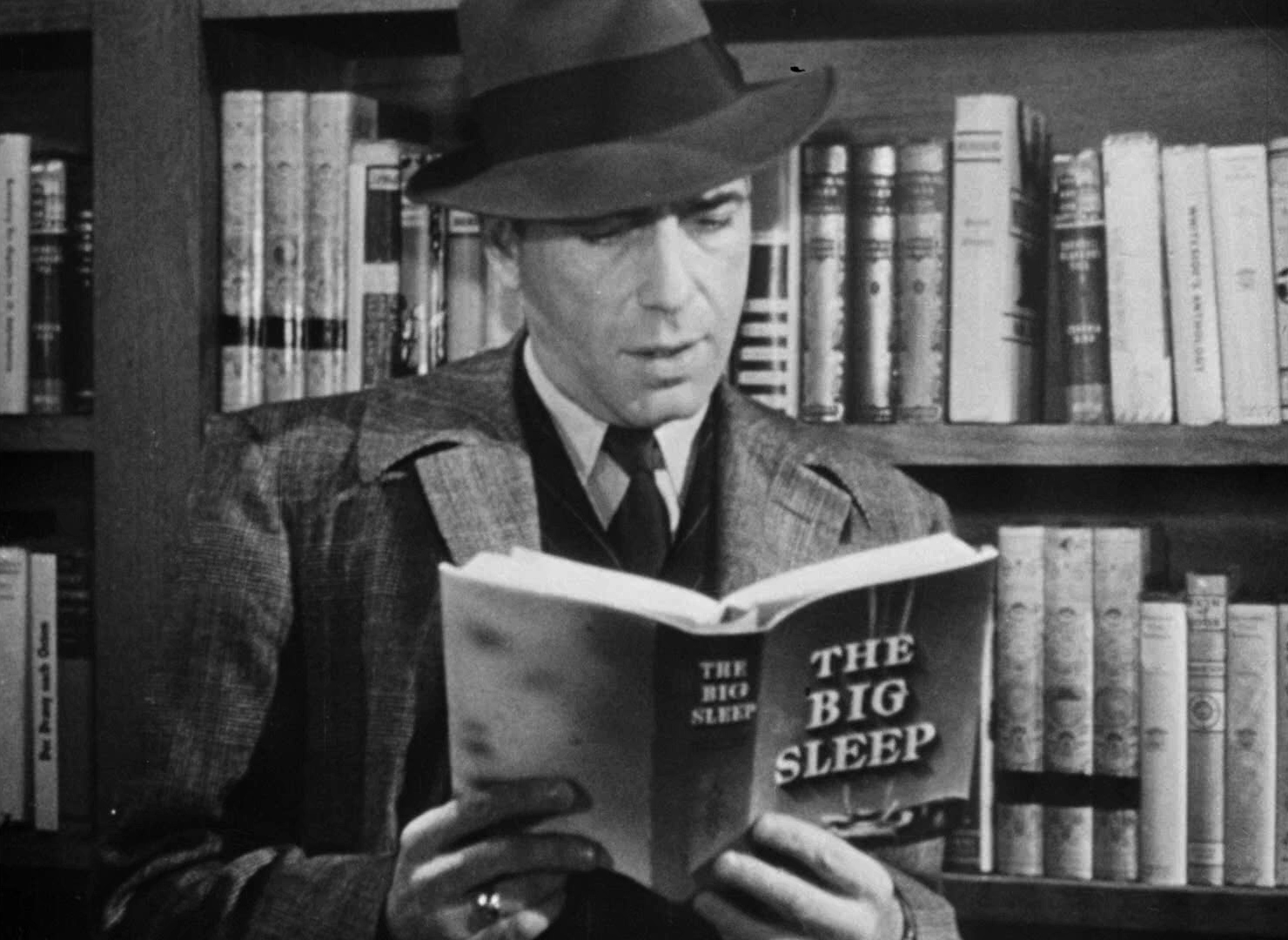
Humphrey Bogart as Philip Marlowe reading Raymond Chandler's The Big Sleep

After making the World War II film Air Force (1943), starring John Garfield and written by Nichols, Hawks did two films with Humphrey Bogart and Lauren Bacall. To Have and Have Not (1944) stars Bogart, Bacall, and Brennan and is based on a novel by Ernest Hemingway. Hawks was a close friend of Hemingway and made a bet with the author that he could make a good film out of Hemingway's "worst book". Hawks, William Faulkner and Jules Furthman collaborated on the script, about an American fishing boat captain working out of Martinique after the Fall of France in 1940. Bogart and Bacall fell in love on the set of the film and married soon afterwards. The greatest strength of the movie has been said to come from its atmosphere and use of wit that really plays on the strengths of Bacall and helps the movie solidify the theme of beauty in perpetual opposition. To Have and Have Not is the only film with contributions from two Nobel laureates, Hemingway and Faulkner. Hawks reunited with Bogart and Bacall in 1945 and 1946 with The Big Sleep, based on the Philip Marlowe detective novel by Raymond Chandler. An early 1945 version was substantially recut to comprise the final 1946 U.S. release with additional scenes emphasizing the special repartee chemistry between Bogart and Bacall. The screenplay for the film also reteamed Faulkner and Furthman, in addition to Leigh Brackett. Chandler, who had been nominated for an Oscar as co-author of the 1944 Double Indemnity screenplay, was not invited to help adapt his best selling novel. The film featured Dorothy Malone in her breakout role, in a part that was largely improvised. Hawks said of her scene: "We just did it because the girl was so damn good-looking. It taught me a great lesson, that if you make a good scene, if we could do something that was fun, the audience goes right along with you." The plot is notoriously convoluted; Hawks recalled that "I never figured out what was going on, but I thought the basic thing had great scenes in it, and was good entertainment. After that I said, 'I'm never going to worry about being logical again.'"

In 1948, Hawks made Red River, an epic Western reminiscent of Mutiny on the Bounty starring John Wayne and Montgomery Clift in his first film. Later that year, Hawks remade his Ball of Fire as A Song Is Born, this time starring Danny Kaye and Virginia Mayo. This version follows the same plot but pays more attention to popular jazz music and includes such jazz legends as Tommy Dorsey, Benny Goodman, Louis Armstrong, Lionel Hampton, and Benny Carter playing themselves. In 1949, Hawks reteamed with Grant in the screwball comedy I Was a Male War Bride, also starring Ann Sheridan.

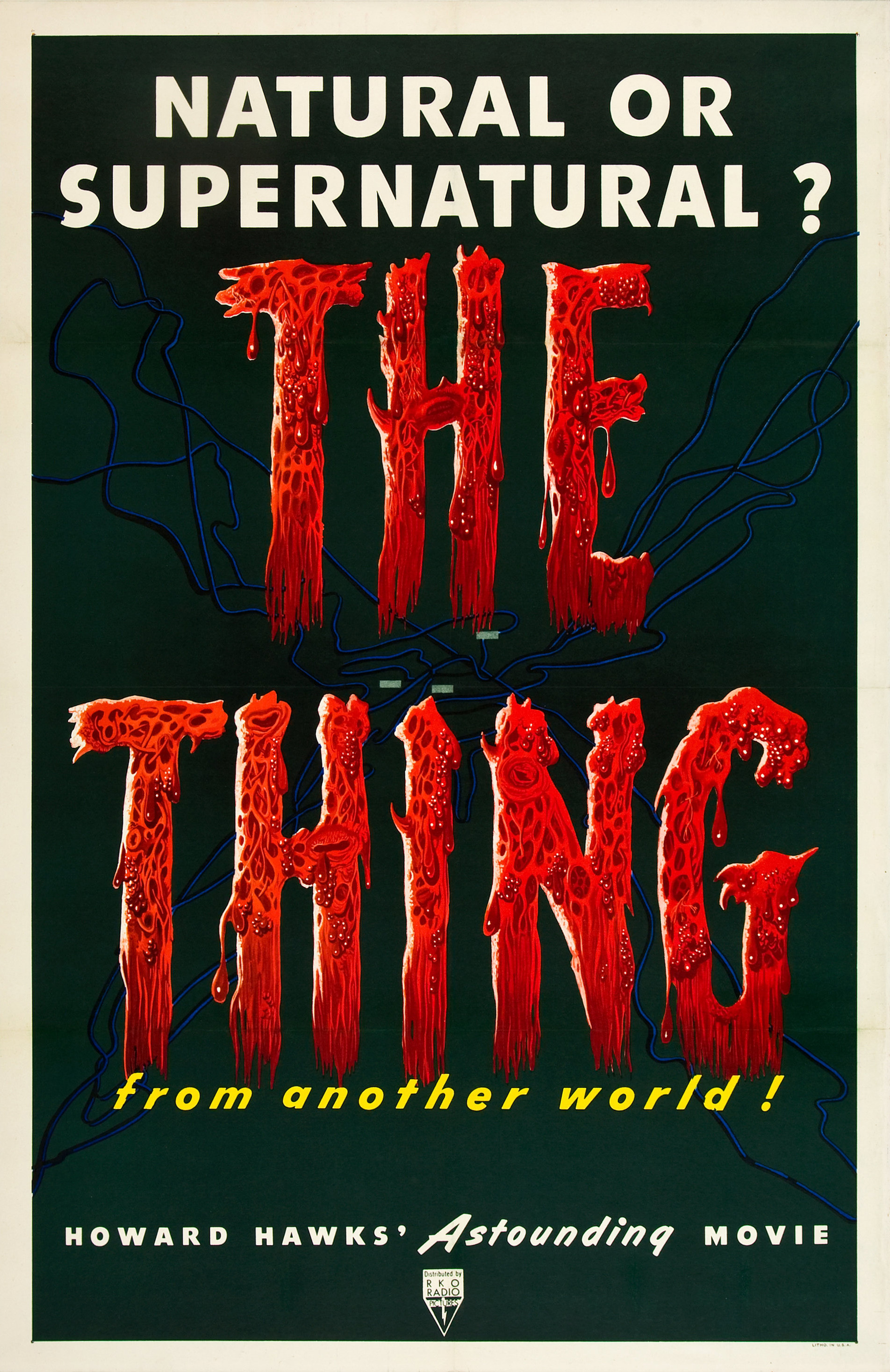
The Thing from Another World poster

In 1951, Hawks produced, and according to some, directed, a science-fiction film, The Thing from Another World. Director John Carpenter stated: "And let's get the record straight. The movie was directed by Howard Hawks. Verifiably directed by Howard Hawks. He let his editor, Christian Nyby, take credit. But the kind of feeling between the male characters—the camaraderie, the group of men that has to fight off the evil—it's all pure Hawksian." He followed this with the 1952 Western The Big Sky, starring Kirk Douglas. Later in 1952, Hawks worked with Grant for the fifth and final time in the screwball comedy Monkey Business, which also starred Marilyn Monroe and Ginger Rogers. Grant plays a scientist (reminiscent of his character in Bringing up Baby) who creates a formula that increases his vitality. Film critic John Belton called the film Hawks's "most organic comedy". Hawks's third film of 1952 was a contribution to the omnibus film O. Henry's Full House, which includes short stories by the writer O. Henry made by various directors. Hawks's short film The Ransom of Red Chief starred Fred Allen, Oscar Levant, and Jeanne Crain.

In 1953, Hawks made Gentlemen Prefer Blondes, which famously featured Marilyn Monroe singing "Diamonds Are a Girl's Best Friend". The film starred Monroe and Jane Russell as two cabaret performing best friends; many critics argue that the film is the only female version of the "buddy film" genre. Choreographer Jack Cole is generally credited with staging the musical numbers while Hawks is credited with directing the non-musical scenes. In 1955, Hawks made Land of the Pharaohs, a sword-and-sandal epic about ancient Egypt that stars Jack Hawkins and Joan Collins. The film was Hawks's final collaboration with longtime friend William Faulkner. In 1959, Hawks worked with John Wayne in Rio Bravo, also starring Dean Martin, Ricky Nelson and Walter Brennan as four lawmen "defending the fort" of their local jail in which a local criminal is awaiting a trial while his family attempt to break him out. The screenplay was written by Furthman and Leigh Brackett, who had collaborated with Hawks previously on The Big Sleep. Film critic Robin Wood has said that if he "were asked to choose a film that would justify the existence of Hollywood ... it would be Rio Bravo."

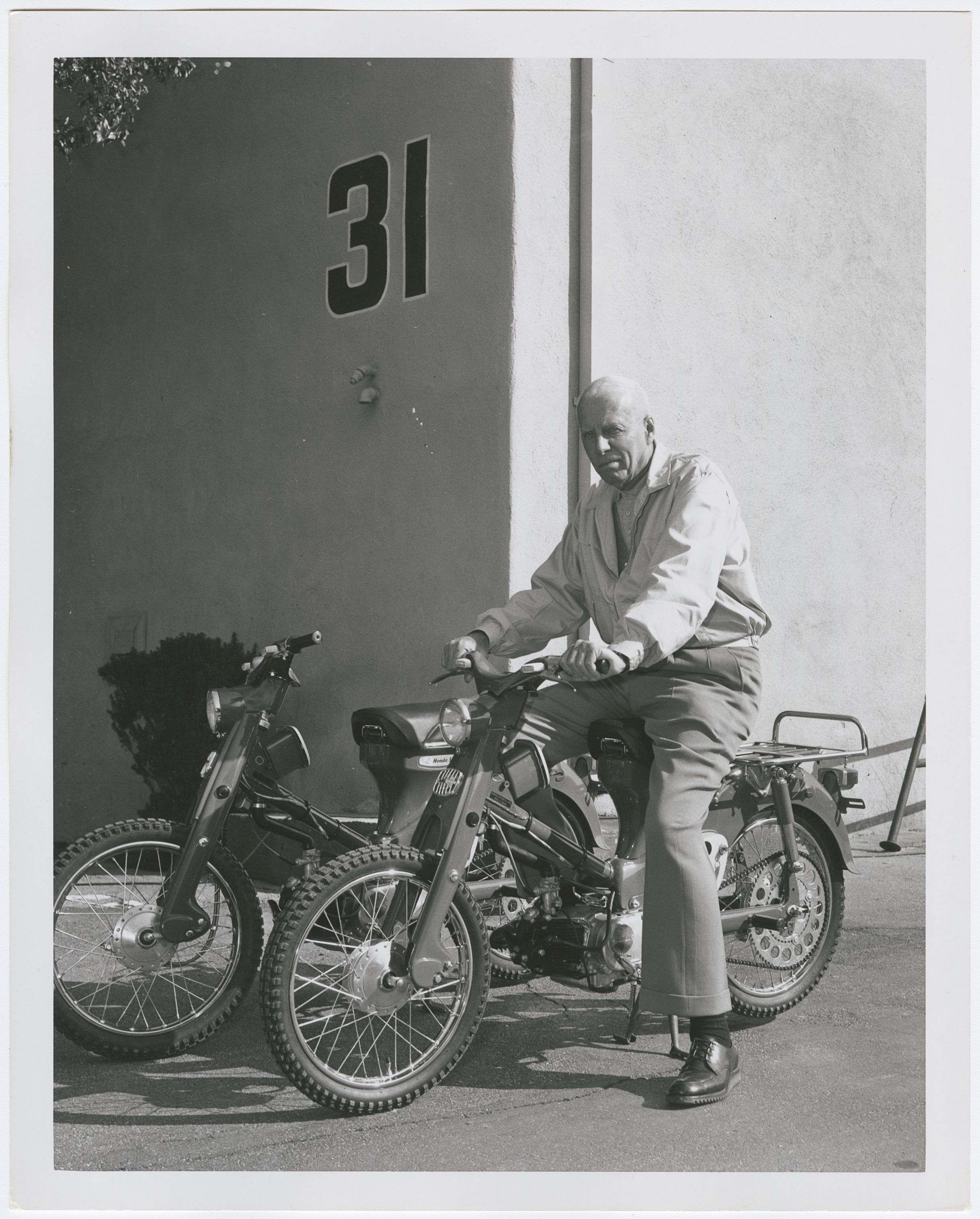
Howard Hawks on a motorcycle

In 1962, Hawks made Hatari!, again with Wayne, who plays a wild animal catcher in Africa. It was also written by Leigh Brackett. Hawks's knowledge of mechanics allowed him to build the camera-car hybrid that allowed him to film the hunting scenes in the film. In 1964, Hawks made his final comedy, Man's Favorite Sport?, starring Rock Hudson (since Cary Grant felt he was too old for the role) and Paula Prentiss. Hawks then returned to his childhood passion for car races with Red Line 7000 in 1965, featuring a young James Caan in his first leading role. Hawks's final two films were both Western remakes of Rio Bravo starring John Wayne and written by Leigh Brackett. In 1966, Hawks directed El Dorado, starring Wayne, Robert Mitchum, and Caan, which was released the following year. He then made Rio Lobo, with Wayne in 1970. After Rio Lobo, Hawks planned a project relating to Ernest Hemingway and "Now, Mr. Gus", a comedy about two male friends seeking oil and money. He died in December 1977, before these projects were completed.

== Personal life ==
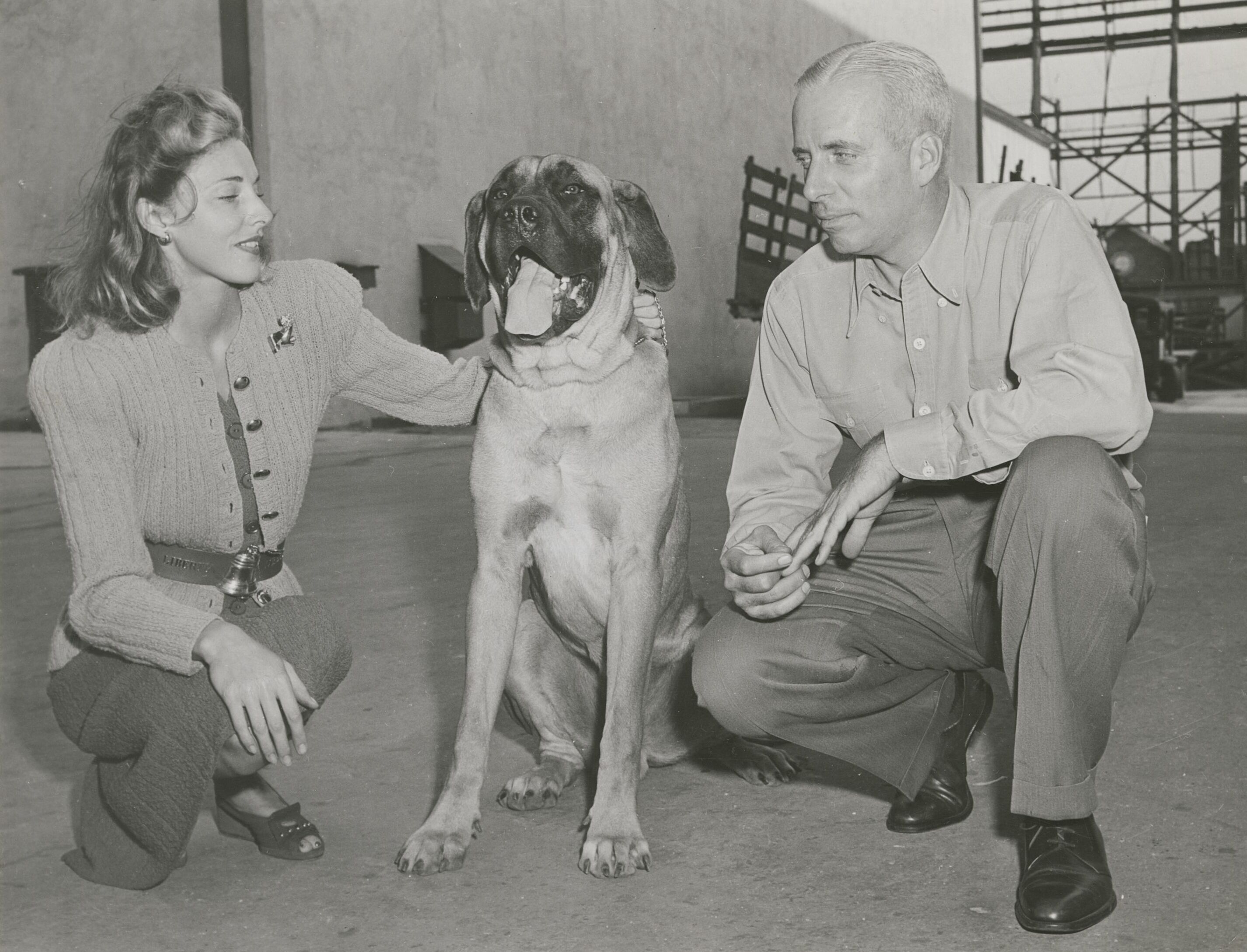
Howard Hawks with Slim Keith and dog

Howard Hawks was married three times: to actress Athole Shearer, Norma Shearer's sister, from 1928 to 1940; to socialite and fashion icon Slim Keith from 1941 to 1949; and to actress Dee Hartford from 1953 to 1959. Hawks had two children with Shearer: Barbara and David. David Hawks worked as an assistant director for the television series M*A*S*H. His second daughter, Kitty Hawks, was a result of his second marriage to "Slim" Keith. Hawks had one son with his last wife, Dee Hartford, who was named Gregg after cinematographer Gregg Toland.

Along with his love of flying machines, Hawks also had a passion for cars and motorcycles. He built the race car that won the 1936 Indianapolis 500, as well as enjoyed riding motorcycles with Barbara Stanwyck and Gary Cooper. Hawks and his son Gregg were members of Checkers Motorcycle Club. Hawks continued riding until the age of 78. His other hobbies included golf, tennis, sailing, horse racing, carpentry, and silversmithing.

Hawks was also known for maintaining close friendships with many American writers such as Ben Hecht, Ernest Hemingway, and William Faulkner. Hawks credited himself with the discovery of William Faulkner and introducing the then-unknown writer to the Algonquin Round Table. Hawks and Faulkner had mutual interests in flying and drinking, and Faulkner admired the films of Hawks, asking Hawks to teach him how to write screenplays. Faulkner wrote five screenplays for Hawks, the first being Today We Live and the last being Land of the Pharaohs. With a mutual interest in fishing and skiing, Hawks was also close with Ernest Hemingway and was almost made the director of the film adaptation of For Whom the Bell Tolls. Hawks found it difficult to forgive Hemingway for his suicide. After coming to terms with it in the 1970s, he began to plan a film project about Hemingway and his relationship with Robert Capa. He never filmed the project.

Hawks supported Thomas Dewey in the 1944 United States presidential election.

== Later life and death ==
By the mid-1970s, Hawks's health began to decline, though he remained active. In addition to being in the early stages of Parkinson's disease in the years leading up to his death, an injury suffered on the set of Rio Lobo severely damaged one of his legs.

Hawks died on December 26, 1977, at the age of 81, from complications arising from a fall when he tripped over his dog at his home in Palm Springs, California. He had spent two weeks in the hospital recovering from his concussion when he asked to be taken home, dying a few days later. His death was attributed directly to "arteriosclerotic vascular disease with stroke". He was working with his last protégée discovery at the time, Larraine Zax.

== Style ==
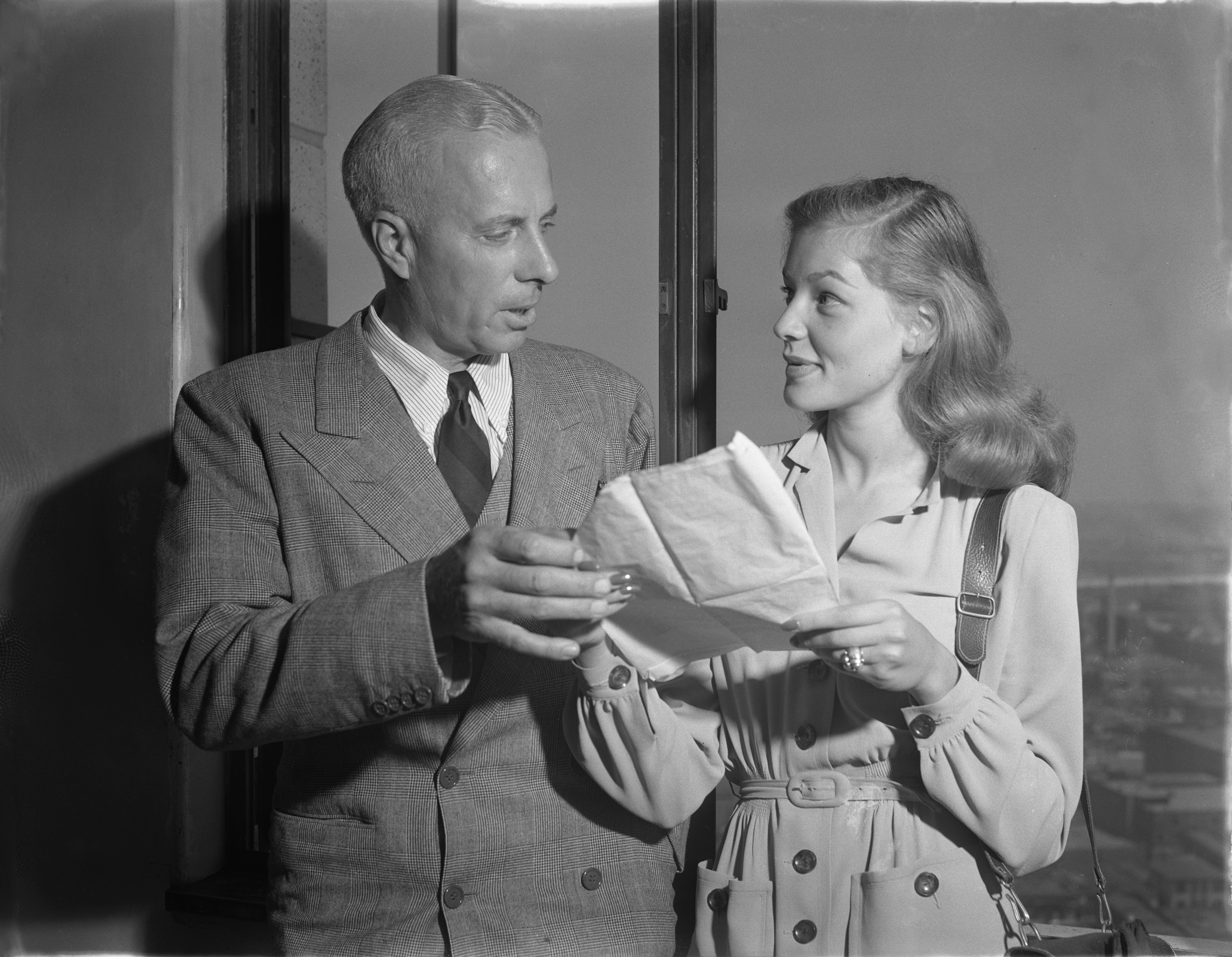
Hawks and Lauren Bacall, 1943

Hawks was a versatile director whose career includes comedies, dramas, gangster films, science fiction, film noir, and Westerns. Hawks's own functional definition of what constitutes a good film is characteristic of his no-nonsense style: "three good scenes, and no bad ones." Hawks also defined a good director as "someone who doesn't annoy you". He described his style: "I try to tell my story as simply as possible, with the camera at eye level. I just imagine the way the story should be told, and I do it." His style was very actor-focused, and he made it a point to take as few shots as possible, thereby preserving an inherent and natural humor for his comedic pieces.

While Hawks was not sympathetic to feminism, he popularized the Hawksian woman archetype, a portrayal of women in stronger, less effeminate roles. Such an emphasis had never been done in the 1920s and therefore was seen to be a rarity and, according to Naomi Wise, has been cited as a prototype of the post-feminist movement. Another notable theme carried throughout his work included the relationship of morality and human interaction. In this sense, he tended to portray more dramatic elements of a concept or a plot in a humorous way.

Orson Welles, in conversation with Peter Bogdanovich, compared Hawks with John Ford: "Hawks is great prose; Ford is poetry." Hawks cited Ford as an influence: "He was a good director when I started, and I copied him every time I could. It's just as if you were a writer, you would read Hemingway and Faulkner and John Dos Passos and Willa Cather." Despite Hawks's work in a variety of Hollywood genres, he still retained an independent sensibility. Film critic David Thomson wrote of Hawks: "Far from the meek purveyor of Hollywood forms, he always chose to turn them upside down. To Have and Have Not and The Big Sleep, ostensibly an adventure and a thriller, are really love stories. Rio Bravo, apparently a Western – everyone wears a cowboy hat – is a comedy conversation piece. The ostensible comedies are shot through with exposed emotions, with the subtlest views of the sex war, and with a wry acknowledgment of the incompatibility of men and women." David Boxwell argues that the filmmaker's body of work "has been accused of a historical and adolescent escapism, but Hawks' fans rejoice in his oeuvre's remarkable avoidance of Hollywood's religiosity, bathos, flag-waving, and sentimentality".

== Writing and producing ==
In addition to his career as a film director, Howard Hawks either wrote or supervised the writing for most of his films. In some cases, he would rewrite parts of the script on set. Due to the Screen Writer's Guild's rule that the director and producer couldn't receive credit for writing, Hawks rarely received credit. Even though Sidney Howard received credit for writing Gone with the Wind (1939), the screenplay was actually written by a myriad of Hollywood screenwriters including David O. Selznick, Ben Hecht, and Howard Hawks. Hawks was an uncredited contributor to many other screenplays, such as Underworld (1927), Morocco (1930), Shanghai Express (1932), and Gunga Din (1939). Hawks also produced many of his own films, preferring not to work under major film studios, because it allowed him creative freedom in his writing, directing, and casting. Hawks would sometimes walk out on films that he wasn't producing himself. Hawks, however, never considered producing to come before his directing. For example, several of the film cards for his films show "Directed and produced by Howard Hawks" with "produced" underneath "directed" in much smaller font. Sometimes his films wouldn't credit any producer. Hawks discovered many well known film stars such as Paul Muni, George Raft, Ann Dvorak, Carole Lombard, Frances Farmer, Jane Russell, Montgomery Clift, Joanne Dru, Angie Dickinson, James Caan, and, most famously, Lauren Bacall.

== Awards and recognition ==
In 1962, Peter Bogdanovich suggested that the Museum of Modern Art do a retrospective on Howard Hawks, who was in the process of releasing Hatari! For marketing purposes, Paramount paid for part of the exhibition, which traveled to Paris and London. For the event, Bogdanovich prepared a monograph. As a result of the retrospective, a special edition of Cahiers du Cinéma was published, and Hawks was featured in his own issue of Movie magazine.

In 1996, Howard Hawks was voted No. 4 on Entertainment Weekly's list of 50 greatest directors. In 2007, Total Film magazine ranked Hawks as No. 4 in its "100 Greatest Film Directors Ever" list. Bringing Up Baby (1938) was listed number 97 on the American Film Institute's AFI's 100 Years...100 Movies. On the AFI's AFI's 100 Years...100 Laughs Bringing Up Baby was listed number 14, His Girl Friday (1940) was listed number 19 and Ball of Fire (1941) was listed number 92. In the 2012 Sight & Sound polls of the greatest films ever made, six films directed by Hawks were in the critics' top 250 films: Rio Bravo (number 63), Bringing Up Baby (number 110), Only Angels Have Wings (number 154), His Girl Friday (number 171), The Big Sleep (number 202), and Red River (number 235). Six of his films currently hold a 100% rating on Rotten Tomatoes. His films Ball of Fire, The Big Sleep, Bringing Up Baby, His Girl Friday, Only Angels Have Wings, Red River, Rio Bravo, Scarface, Sergeant York, The Thing from Another World, and Twentieth Century were deemed "culturally, historically, or aesthetically significant" by the United States Library of Congress and inducted into the National Film Registry. With eleven films, he ties with John Ford for directing the most films that are in the registry.

From the film industry, he received three nominations for Outstanding Directorial Achievement in Motion Pictures from the Directors Guild of America for Red River in 1949, The Big Sky in 1953, and Rio Bravo in 1960. He was inducted into the Online Film and Television Association's Hall of Fame for his directing in 2005. For his contribution to the motion picture industry, Howard Hawks has a star on the Hollywood Walk of Fame at 1708 Vine Street. He was nominated for Academy Award for Best Director in 1942 for Sergeant York, but he received his only Oscar in 1974 as an Honorary Award from the academy. He was cited as "a giant of the American cinema whose pictures, taken as a whole, represent one of the most consistent, vivid, and varied bodies of work in world cinema" and "a master filmmaker whose creative efforts hold a distinguished place in world cinema."

Directed Academy Award performances
Under Hawks's direction, these actors have received Academy Award wins and nominations for their performances in their respective roles.

Year	Performer	Film	Result
Academy Award for Best Actor
1941	Gary Cooper	Sergeant York	Won
Academy Award for Best Actress
1941	Barbara Stanwyck	Ball of Fire	Nominated
Academy Award for Best Supporting Actor
1936	Walter Brennan	Come and Get It	Won
1941	Walter Brennan	Sergeant York	Nominated
1952	Arthur Hunnicutt	The Big Sky	Nominated
Academy Award for Best Supporting Actress
1941	Margaret Wycherly	Sergeant York	Nominated

== Influence and legacy ==
In the 1950s, Eugene Archer, a film fan, was planning on writing a book on important American film directors such as John Ford. However, after reading Cahiers du Cinéma, Archer learned that the French film scene was more interested in Alfred Hitchcock and Howard Hawks. Books were not written on Hawks until the 1960s, and a full biography on Hawks wasn't published until 1997, twenty years after his death. Film critic Andrew Sarris cited Howard Hawks as "the least known and least appreciated Hollywood director of any stature". According to professor of film studies Ian Brookes, Hawks is not as well known as other directors, because of his lack of association with a particular genre such as Ford with Westerns and Hitchcock with thrillers. Hawks worked across many genres including gangster, film noir, musical comedy, romantic comedy, screwball comedy, Western, aviation, and combat. Moreover, Hawks preferred not to associate with major studios during his film production. He worked for all major studios at least once on short-term contract, but many of his films were produced under his own name. The simplicity of his narratives and stories may also have contributed to his under-recognition. Commercially, his films were successful, but he received little critical acclaim except for one Academy Award nomination for Best Director for Sergeant York (he lost to John Ford for How Green Was My Valley) and an Honorary Academy Award presented to him two years before his death.

Some critics limit Hawks by his action films, describing Hawks as a director who produced films with a "masculine bias"; however, action scenes in Hawks's films were often left to second-unit directors, and Hawks actually preferred to work indoors. Howard Hawks's style is difficult to interpret because there is no recognizable relationship between his visual and narrative style as in the films of his contemporary directors. Because his camera style was derived more from his working method rather than anecdotal or visual realization, his camera work is unobtrusive, making his films appear to have little to no cinematographic style. Hawks's style can, rather, be characterized as improvisational and collaborative. Hawks's directorial style and the use of natural, conversational dialogue in his films are cited as major influences on many noted filmmakers, including Robert Altman, John Carpenter, and Quentin Tarantino. His work is also admired by Peter Bogdanovich, Martin Scorsese, François Truffaut, Michael Mann, and Jacques Rivette. Andrew Sarris in his influential book of film criticism The American Cinema: Directors and Directions 1929–1968 included Hawks in the "pantheon" of the 14 greatest film directors who had worked in the United States. Brian De Palma dedicated his version of Scarface to Hawks and Ben Hecht. Altman was influenced by the fast-paced dialogue of His Girl Friday in M*A*S*H and subsequent productions. Hawks was nicknamed "The Gray Fox" by members of the Hollywood community, thanks to his prematurely gray hair.

Hawks has been considered by some film critics to be an auteur both because of his recognizable style and frequent use of specific thematic elements, and because of his attention to all aspects of his films, not merely directing. Hawks was venerated by French critics associated with Cahiers du cinéma, who intellectualized his work in a way that Hawks himself found moderately amusing (his work was promoted in France by The Studio des Ursulines cinema). Although he was not at first taken seriously by British critics of the Sight & Sound circle, other independent British writers, such as Robin Wood, admired his films. Wood named Hawks's Rio Bravo as his top film of all time. David Thomson writes that "There was an absurdist in Hawks, and a Nabokovian delight in the game for its own sake. Thus, in a very important way, this seeming American may have been against the grain of his time and place. That may help explain why the films grow in wonder."

== General and cited references ==
- Breivold, Scott (February 2006). Howard Hawks: Interviews. University Press of Mississippi. ISBN 978-1-57806-833-3.
- Brookes, Ian (2016). Howard Hawks: New Perspectives. London: Palgrave. ISBN 978-1-84457-542-8.
- Crouse, Richard (October 2005). Reel Winners: Movie Award Trivia. Dundurn. p. 250. ISBN 978-1-55002-574-3.
- Dixon, Wheeler Winston; Foster, Gwendolyn Audrey (2008). A Short History of Film (PDF). New Brunswick, New Jersey: Rutgers University Press. p. 101. ISBN 978-0-8135-4269-0.
- Franks, Don (2004). A Music, Cinema, Theatre and Broadcasting Guide, 1928 through 2003 (Third ed.). Jefferson, North Carolina: McFarland & Company. p. 243. ISBN 978-0-7864-1798-8.
- Fuller, Samuel (November 2002). A Third Face: My Tale of Writing, Fighting, and Filmmaking. Knopf. p. 101. ISBN 978-0-375-40165-7.
- Gregory, Charles (1973). ""The Long Goodbye" by Robert Altman" (PDF). Film Quarterly. 26 (4): 46–48. doi:10.2307/1211501. JSTOR 1211501.
- Hillier, Jim; Wollen, Peter, eds. (April 1997). Howard Hawks: American Artist. British Film Institute. pp. 111–119. ISBN 978-0-85170-593-4.
- Laham, Nicholas (May 2009). Currents of Comedy on the American Screen: How Film and Television Deliver Different Laughs for Changing Times. McFarland. pp. 27–29. ISBN 978-0-7864-4264-5.
- Martin, Jeffrey Brown (1985). Ben Hecht: Hollywood Screenwriter. Ann Arbor, Michigan: UMI Research Press. ISBN 978-0-8357-1571-3.
- Mast, Gerald (1982). Howard Hawks, Storyteller. New York: Oxford University Press. ISBN 978-0-19-503091-4.
- McBride, Joseph (1972). Focus on Howard Hawks. Englewood Cliffs, NJ: Prentice-Hall.
- McBride, Joseph (1982). Hawks on Hawks. Berkeley, California: University of California Press.
- McCarthy, Todd (1997). Howard Hawks: The Grey Fox of Hollywood. New York: Grove Press. ISBN 978-0-8021-3740-1.
- Moss, Marilyn Ann (August 2015). Giant: George Stevens, a Life on Film. University of Wisconsin Press. p. 57. ISBN 978-0-299-20434-1.
- Sarris, Andrew (1968). The American Cinema: Directors and Directions: 1929–1968. New York: Dutton. ISBN 9780525472278.
- Thomson, David (November 1994). A Biographical Dictionary of Film (3 ed.). Knopf. p. 322. ISBN 978-0-679-75564-7.
- Wakeman, John (1987). World Film Directors, Volume 1, 1890–1945. New York: The H.W. Wilson Company. pp. 446–451. ISBN 978-0-8242-0757-1.
- Willis, Donald C. (1975). The Films of Howard Hawks. Metuchen, NJ: Scarecrow Press. ISBN 9780810808607.
- Wollen, Peter (Spring 2002). "Who the Hell is Howard Hawks?". Framework: The Journal of Cinema and Media. 43 (1): 9–17. JSTOR 41552312.
