= Slim Keith =

American socialite (1917–1990)

The Right Honourable The Lady Keith of Castleacre
- Born: Mary Raye Gross; July 15, 1917; Salinas, California, U.S.
- Died: April 16, 1990 (aged 72); New York City, U.S.
- Other names: Nancy, Lady Keith; Slim Hawks; Slim Hayward
- Spouses: Howard Hawks (m. 1941; div. 1949) Leland Hayward (m. 1949; div. 1960) Kenneth Keith, Baron Keith of Castleacre (m. 1962; sep. 1972)
- Children: Kitty Hawks

Nancy "Slim" Keith, Lady Keith of Castleacre (born Mary Raye Gross; July 15, 1917 – April 16, 1990) was an American socialite and fashion icon during the 1950s and 1960s, exemplifying the American jet set. Keith was married three times: first, to American film director Howard Hawks; second to American producer Leland Hayward; and finally to British banker and aristocrat Kenneth Keith, Baron Keith of Castleacre.

She and her friend Babe Paley were the thinly veiled inspiration for characters in Truman Capote's novel Answered Prayers. She is also credited with bringing Lauren Bacall to Hollywood's attention by showing her then-husband, producer Howard Hawks, a magazine cover with Bacall's picture on it.

== Early life ==
Slim Keith was born Mary Raye Gross in Salinas, California, to Edward Gross and Raye Nell Boyer Gross (who later changed Mary's name to Nancy). Her father was a successful businessman who owned several canneries in nearby Monterey. She had an older sister named Theodora and a younger brother named Buddy. In the winter of 1928, Buddy died in a tragic accident after his nightshirt caught fire and caused fatal burns. The loss fractured the Gross family, with Edward blaming his wife for the accident.

Nancy was sent to a Dominican convent school in San Rafael. Her father would eventually leave her mother and tried to persuade Nancy to choose his side in the divorce, promising her a car, a horse, and other presents. Nancy, however, chose to stay with her mother, causing a permanent estrangement between Edward and his daughter.

By age 22, she had appeared on the cover of Harper's Bazaar. She was included on that celebrated fashion magazine's "best-dressed" list for years, and in 1946 won a Neiman Marcus Fashion Award. Nicknamed “Slim,” she was also dubbed the original "California Girl" because of her golden looks and athletic ability. She considered a career in opera, before deciding it was too demanding.

== Personal life ==
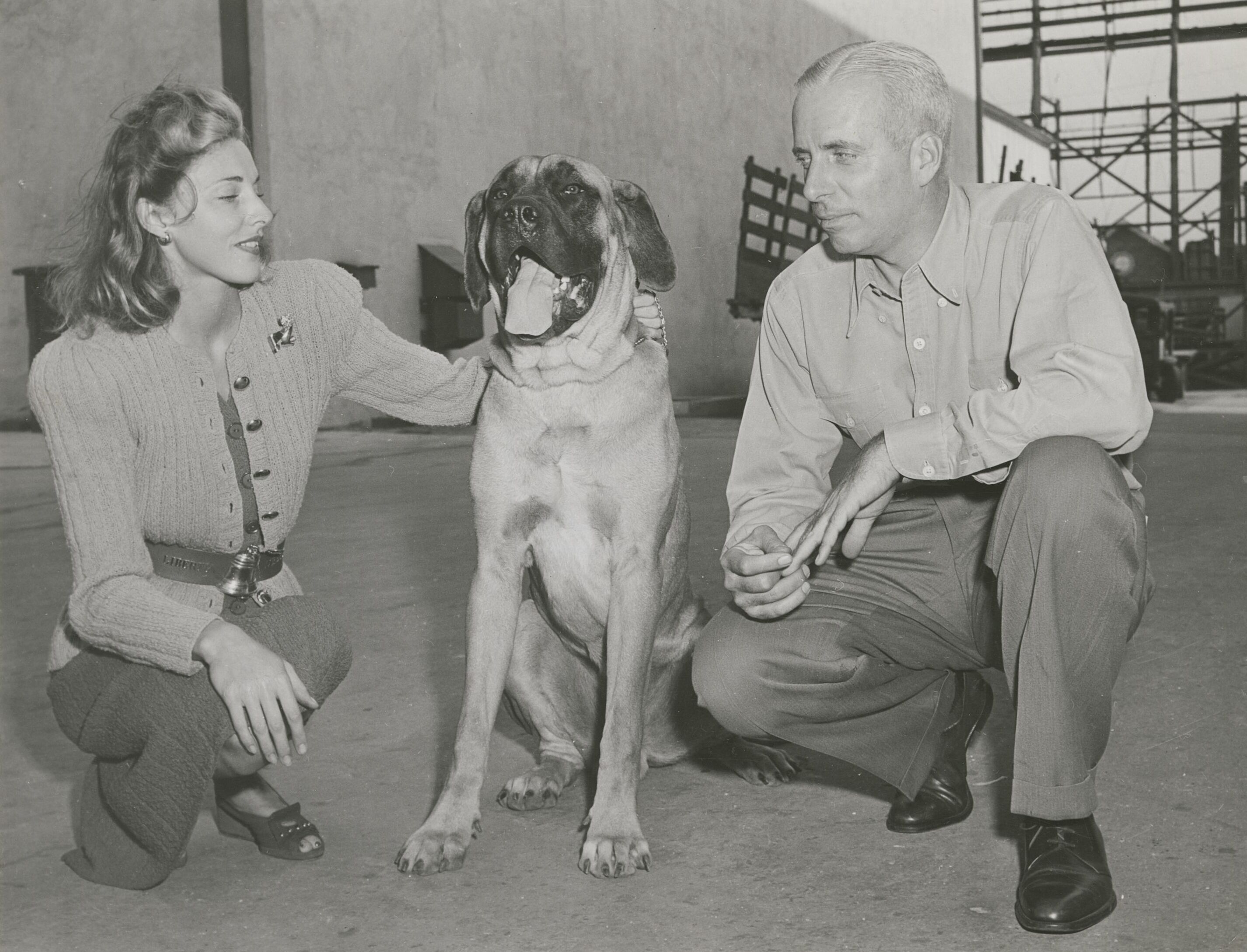
Slim Keith with Howard Hawks and dog, ca. 1942.

Slim left school at the age of 16 and traveled to Death Valley. While staying at the Furnace Creek Inn and Ranch Resort, she met William Powell. Through Powell, she was introduced to William Randolph Hearst and his companion Marion Davies. She thus became a Hollywood socialite and was frequently seen at parties with Gary Cooper and Cary Grant. She was pursued romantically by Clark Gable, as well as Ernest Hemingway. In 1938, she met noted film director Howard Hawks, who was immediately smitten with her and did everything he could to persuade her to marry him despite the fact he was already married to Athole Shearer, the sister of actress Norma Shearer. Three years later, he was divorced from Athole and married Slim. Hawks was unable to remain faithful and shortly after the birth of their daughter Kitty Hawks in 1946, Slim moved to Havana to stay with Ernest Hemingway. There in Cuba, she met the man who would be her second husband, movie and theatrical producer Leland Hayward. Through Hayward, her step-granddaughter was Marin Hopper. In 1949, soon after divorcing their respective spouses, they married in New York and remained together for 10 years. Slim later wrote that Hayward had been the one love of her life even though he had left her for Pamela Churchill. Slim's next and last husband was British banker Kenneth Keith, whom she left in 1972 after a 10-year marriage.

Keith banished Truman Capote from her life when he used her as the model for the unflattering, fictional Lady Coolbirth of his infamous and unfinished Answered Prayers (eventually published as Answered Prayers: The Unfinished Novel in 1986). In 1975, excerpts from his unfinished novel appeared in Esquire magazine. The excerpt "La Côte Basque 1965" in particular, published in November 1975, caused a scandal in high society. After its publication, Keith never spoke to Capote again. According to Sally Bedell Smith in Reflected Glory, the model for Lady Coolbirth was Pamela Harriman, not Slim Keith.

Slim was also known for her sense of style. With exceptional taste, Slim pursued an elegant, crisp style in all that she wore.

== Death ==
The last years of her life were spent pursuing travel and quiet social activities in New York. An inveterate smoker, she died at age 72 of lung cancer at New York Hospital.

== Fictional portrayals ==
Slim Keith was portrayed in the film Infamous (2006) by Hope Davis, and mentioned briefly in Rear Window (1954) as Slim Hayward. Her marriage to Howard Hawks was depicted in Tonya Walker's short story "Slim" in The Cunningham Short Story Anthology Our World, Your Place (2018) edited by Trevor Maynard and published by Willowdown Books.

Keith was also depicted along with Pamela Churchill in Tonya Walker's Slim and the Notorious Mrs. Churchill (2025). The historical novel unravels the fraught relationship of these two powerful socialites as their worlds collide over the same man. Inspired by a line in Keith's memoir, "Nobody marries Pamela Churchill — nobody has to." The novel takes place in 1958, and the notorious mistress to millionaires is 39, nursing a failing affair and a second chin. Nearly broke, she needs a husband fast. Having cycled through every eligible man in Europe, she sets her sights on the New World, co-opting America's most celebrated socialite, Babe Paley as her reluctant wing-woman. Together they target the husband of Babe's best friend, Slim Hayward — with unexpected results.

Keith was portrayed in Melanie Benjamin's The Swans of Fifth Avenue (2016). The novel explores elements of Slim's colorful life, as well as her friendships with Babe Paley and Truman Capote. Although her remarkable sense of style is not a focus of the novel, much can be said about her contributions to classic, Americana dress. In a particularly revealing scene, Benjamin imagines Keith raising a glass to Babe and Truman. She recalls, "'A time before it was fashionable to tell the truth, and the world grew sordid from too much honesty.'"

The fallout from the publication of "La Côte Basque 1965" in November 1975 is dramatized in Feud: Capote vs. The Swans with Diane Lane as Slim. Lane's portrayal of Slim as the central antagonist of the season was crticially praised, and Lane was nominated for a Primetime Emmy Award for her portrayal.
