= Joseph McBride (writer) =

American journalist (born 1947)

Joseph Pierce McBride
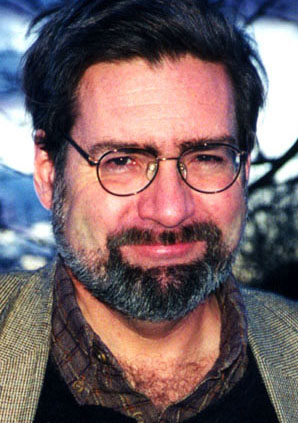
- Born: August 9, 1947 (age 78); Milwaukee, Wisconsin, U.S.
- Education: Marquette University High School, University of Wisconsin
- Occupations: Historian; biographer; screenwriter; author; actor
- Employer: San Francisco State University
- Partner: Ann Weiser Cornell
- Awards: Writers Guild of America Award
- Website: josephmcbridefilm.com

Joseph McBride (born August 9, 1947) is an American film historian, biographer, screenwriter, author and educator. He has written books on a variety of subjects including notable film directors, screenwriting, the JFK assassination, and a memoir of his youth.

He also serves as professor in the Cinema Department at San Francisco State University.

== Career ==
=== Early life and career ===
Born in Milwaukee, Wisconsin, McBride grew up in the suburb of Wauwatosa. He attended the University of Wisconsin, Madison, and worked as a reporter for the Wisconsin State Journal in Madison, before moving to California in 1973.

=== Books ===
McBride has published more than 20 books, including biographies of directors Steven Spielberg (Steven Spielberg: A Biography, 1997, and published in translation in mainland China in 2012), Frank Capra (Frank Capra: The Catastrophe of Success, 1992), two of John Ford: John Ford (with Michael Wilmington, 1974) and Searching for John Ford) (2001) and three of Orson Welles: Orson Welles (1972), Orson Welles: Actor and Director (1977) and What Ever Happened to Orson Welles?: A Portrait of an Independent Career (2006). McBride's interview book with Howard Hawks, Hawks on Hawks, was published in 1982.

In 2012, he published a screenwriting manual, Writing in Pictures: Screenwriting Made (Mostly) Painless. In the book, McBride uses his adaptation of Jack London’s short story "To Build a Fire" to break down the steps necessary for a screenplay, such as research, treatments, and outlines. The book draws from his extensive teaching experience.

In 2013, he published Into the Nightmare: My Search for the Killers of President John F. Kennedy and Officer J. D. Tippit, which was the result of McBride's 31-year investigation of the case. Later, in 2015, he published The Broken Places: A Memoir, which deals with his troubled childhood, his teenage breakdown, and his subsequent recovery.

Columbia University Press published How Did Lubitsch Do It?, McBride's look at the career of filmmaker Ernst Lubitsch, in June 2018.

In March 2019, McBride's Frankly: Unmasking Frank Capra was published. It recounts his legal battle with original publisher Knopf/Random House and Capra allies over publication of his biography Frank Capra: The Catastrophe of Success, which was published by Simon & Schuster in 1992. His biography of Billy Wilder, Billy Wilder: Dancing on the Edge was published in 2021.

=== Film and television ===
McBride's screenwriting credits include Blood and Guts (1978) and Rock 'n' Roll High School (1979) and five American Film Institute Life Achievement Award specials on CBS-TV about Fred Astaire, Frank Capra, Lillian Gish, John Huston, and James Stewart. He was also cowriter of the United States Information Agency worldwide live TV special Let Poland Be Poland (1982).

He plays a film critic, Mr. Pister, in the Orson Welles feature The Other Side of the Wind (1970–76) and served as a consultant on its completion in 2018. He is also the coproducer of the documentaries Obsessed with Vertigo: New Life for Hitchcock's Masterpiece (1997) and John Ford Goes to War (2002).

== Awards and honors ==
McBride received the "Television: Comedy/Variety - Special" Writers Guild of America Award in 1984 for cowriting The American Film Institute Salute to John Huston with producer George Stevens, Jr. He has also received four other WGA nominations, two Emmy nominations, and a Canadian Film Awards nomination. The French edition of Searching for John Ford, titled A la recherche de John Ford, published in 2007, was chosen the Best Foreign Film Book of the Year by the French film critics' association, le Syndicat Français de la Critique de Cinéma.

A documentary feature on his life and work, Behind the Curtain: Joseph McBride on Writing Film History, written and directed by Hart Perez, had its world debut in 2011 at the Tiburon International Film Festival in Tiburon, Marin County, CA, and was released on DVD in 2012.

== Personal life ==
McBride lives in Berkeley, California. His life partner is author and psychology educator Ann Weiser Cornell.

== Bibliography ==
=== As author ===
- Orson Welles (1972, revised and expanded 1996)
- John Ford (1975, with Michael Wilmington, revised and expanded 2023)
- Kirk Douglas (1976)
- Orson Welles: Actor and Director (1977)
- High and Inside: An A-to-Z Guide to the Language of Baseball (1980)
- Hawks on Hawks (1982)
- "The Man Who Wasn't There: 'George Bush,' CIA Operative." The Nation (Jul. 16/23, 1988), pp. 1, 41–42.

Republished in Plausible Denial: Was the CIA Involved in the Assassination of JFK?, by Mark Lane (1992), pp. 371-375.

- "Where Was George." The Nation (Aug. 13/20, 1988)

Republished in Plausible Denial: Was the CIA Involved in the Assassination of JFK?, by Mark Lane (1992), pp. 376-378.

- Frank Capra: The Catastrophe of Success (1992)
- Steven Spielberg: A Biography (1997, revised and expanded 2012)
- The Book of Movie Lists: An Offbeat, Provocative Collection of the Best and Worst of Everything in Movies (1998)
- Searching for John Ford (2001)
- What Ever Happened to Orson Welles?: A Portrait of an Independent Career (2006, revised and expanded 2022)
- Writing in Pictures: Screenwriting Made (Mostly) Painless (2012)
- Into the Nightmare: My Search for the Killers of President John F. Kennedy and Officer J.D. Tippit (2013)
- The Broken Places: A Memoir (2015)
- Two Cheers for Hollywood: Joseph McBride on Movies (2017)
- How Did Lubitsch Do It? (2018)
- Frankly: Unmasking Frank Capra (2019)
- Billy Wilder: Dancing on the Edge (2021)
- Political Truth: The Media and the Assassination of President Kennedy (2022)
- The Whole Durn Human Comedy: Life According to the Coen Brothers (2022)

=== As editor ===
- Persistence of Vision: A Collection of Film Criticism (1968)
- Focus on Howard Hawks (1972)
- Filmmakers on Filmmaking: The American Film Institute Seminars on Motion Pictures and Television, Volume 1 (1983)
- Filmmakers on Filmmaking: The American Film Institute Seminars on Motion Pictures and Television, Volume 2 (1983)
