= Ames family =

American family

- Current region: Massachusetts, United States
- Etymology: Amyas; merchant of Amiens
- Origin: England
- Founded: 1638
- Founder: William Ames
- Connected families: Butler
- Estates: Borderland; Queset House

The Ames family is one of the oldest and most illustrious families of the United States. The family's branches are descended from John Ames, the son of a 17th-century settler of the Province of Massachusetts Bay. Numerous public and private works throughout the U.S. are named after family members, including the city Ames, Iowa, and the NASA Ames research center in California.

== Origins ==
The scion of the American Ames family was William Ames, who was born in England to John Ames and Cyprian Ames (née Brown) in 1605. The family's earliest known ancestor died in 1560. It is thought the family's surname was, at some point prior to emigration, changed from Amyas. In the 16th century Amyas was frequently confused with Ames.

William Ames immigrated to Massachusetts Bay in 1638, eventually settled in Braintree, and died in about 1653. With his wife Hannah, he had one son, John, born in 1647. (Note: A younger brother of William Ames, John, arrived in Massachusetts a few years after William Ames and settled in Duxbury. He fought in King Philip's War and had two sons, William and John.)

=== Heraldry ===
The heraldist William Armstrong Crozier recorded an heraldic achievement matriculated to William Ames, from an original grant issued by the College of Arms.

Shield
Argent on a bend cotissed between two annulets Sable, a quatrefoil between two roses of the field;
Crest
A rose Argent, slipped and leaved proper, in front thereof an annulet Or

== Notable family members ==
The children of William Ames' son, John (born 1647), included John (born 1672), Nathaniel (1677), and Thomas (born 1681). They, in turn, had a number of notable descendants.

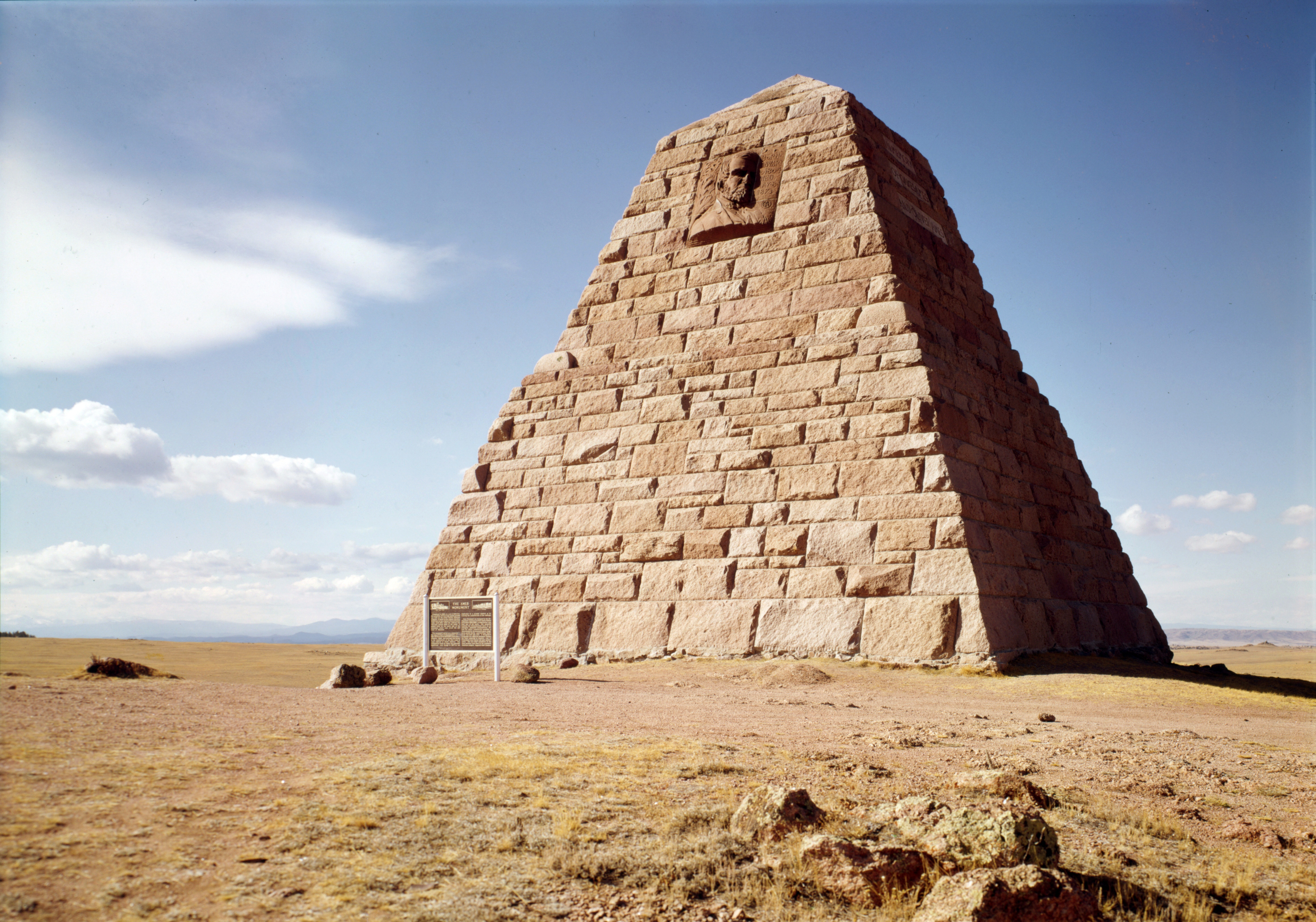
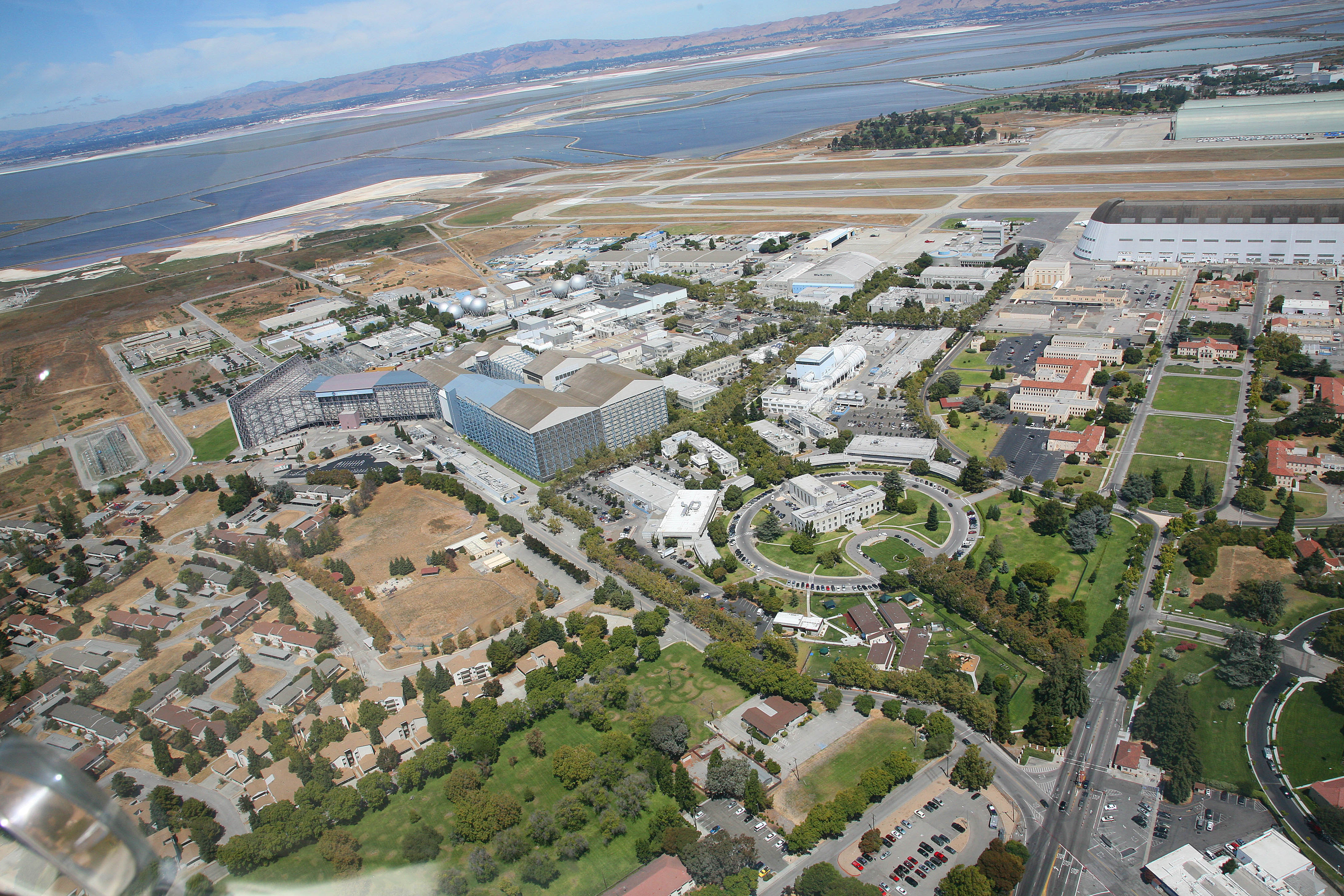
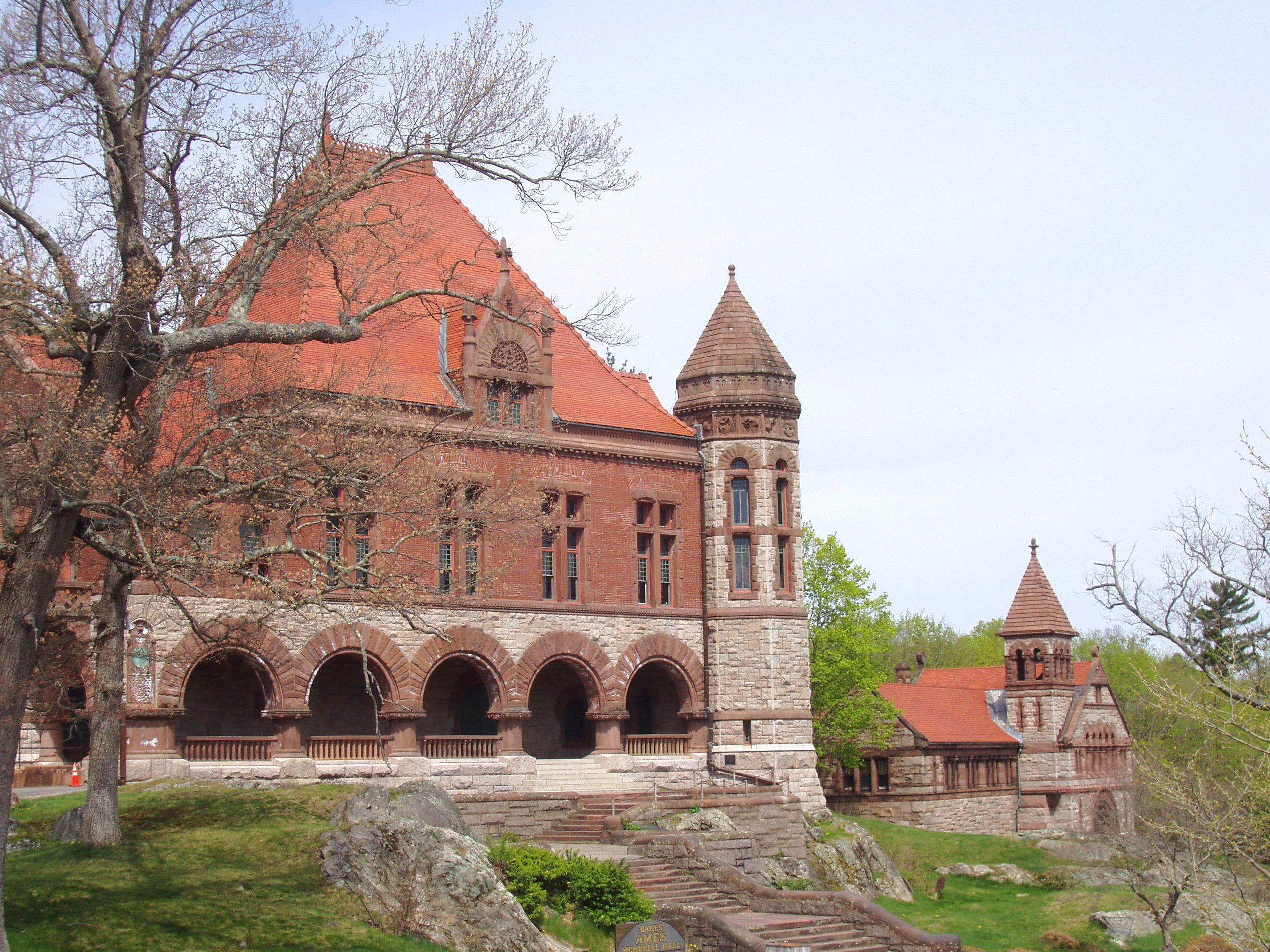
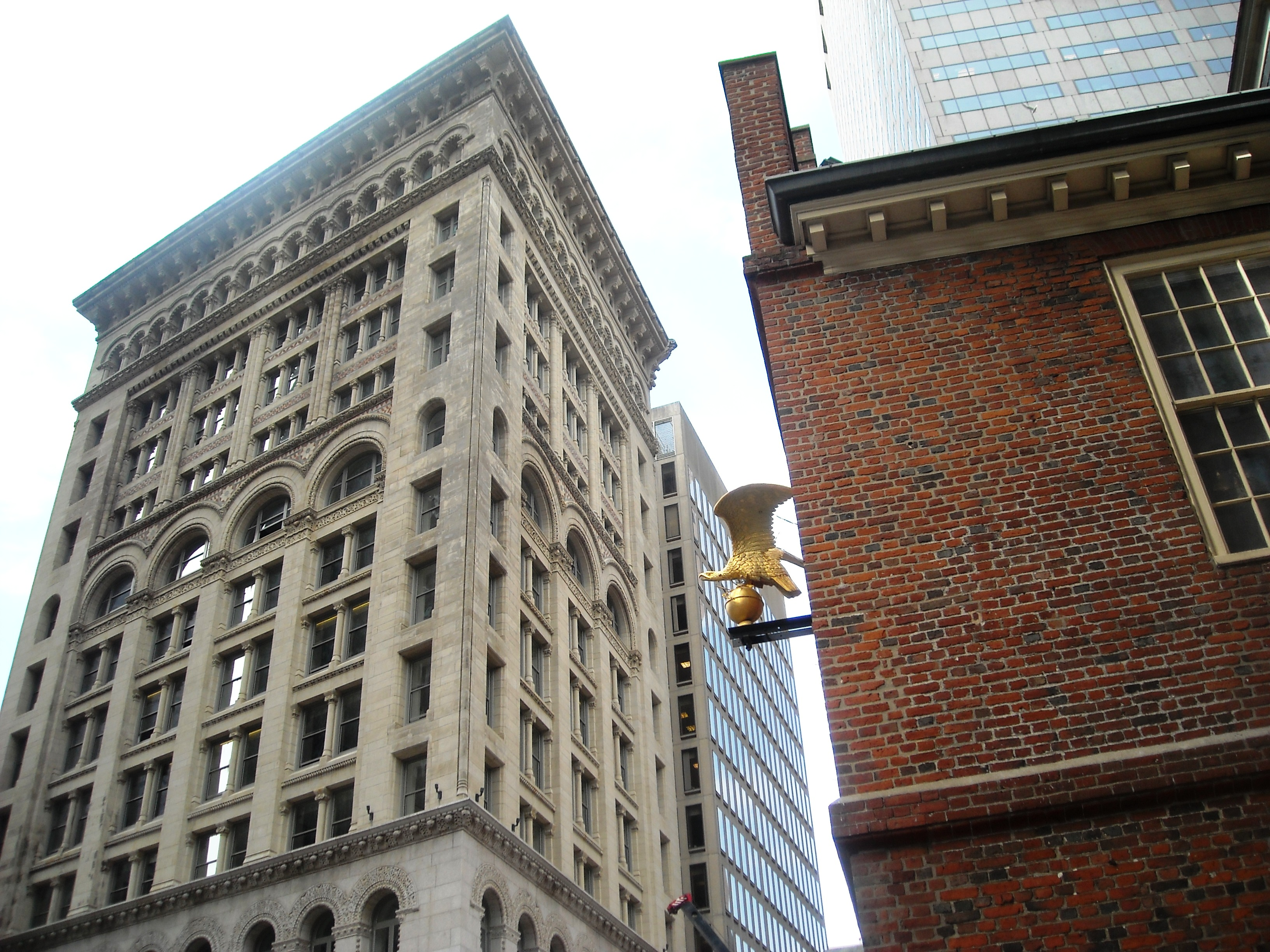
Among many monuments and facilities named after members of the Ames family include (clockwise, from top left) the Ames Monument, NASA's Ames Research Center, Boston's Ames Building, and the Ames Memorial Hall.

=== Descendants of John Ames (born 1672) ===
- Samuel Ames (1824-1875), chief justice of the Rhode Island Supreme Court
- Marcus Ames (1828-1887), chaplain of the state institutions of Rhode Island
- Herman Vandenburg Ames (1865-1935), dean of the University of Pennsylvania Graduate School
- Joseph Sweetman Ames (1865-1943), president of Johns Hopkins University
- Louis Annin Ames (1866-1952), businessman and designer of the City of New York flag

=== Descendants of Nathaniel Ames (born 1677) ===
- Nathaniel Ames (1708-1764), almanac publisher
- Fisher Ames (1758-1808), member of the United States Congress
- Nathaniel Ames, (1741-1822), doctor and almanac publisher
- Nathaniel Ames (1796-1835), seafarer and author
- Ellis Ames (1809-1886), member of the Massachusetts General Court

=== Descendants of Thomas Ames (born 1681) ===
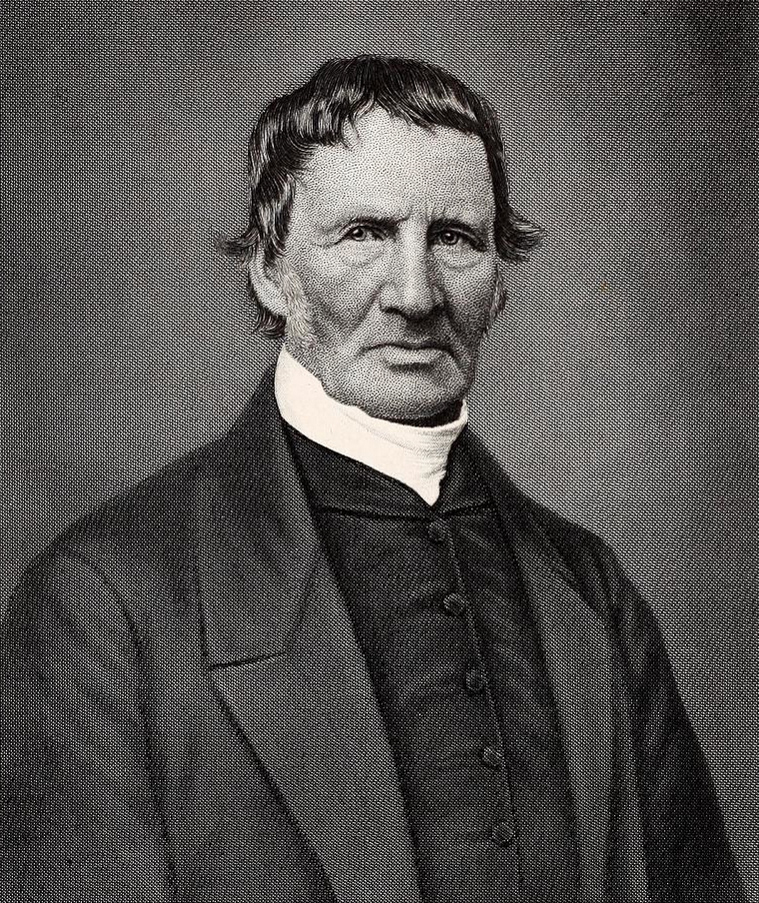
Oliver Ames Sr., patriarch of the Ames business dynasty in Easton, Massachusetts.

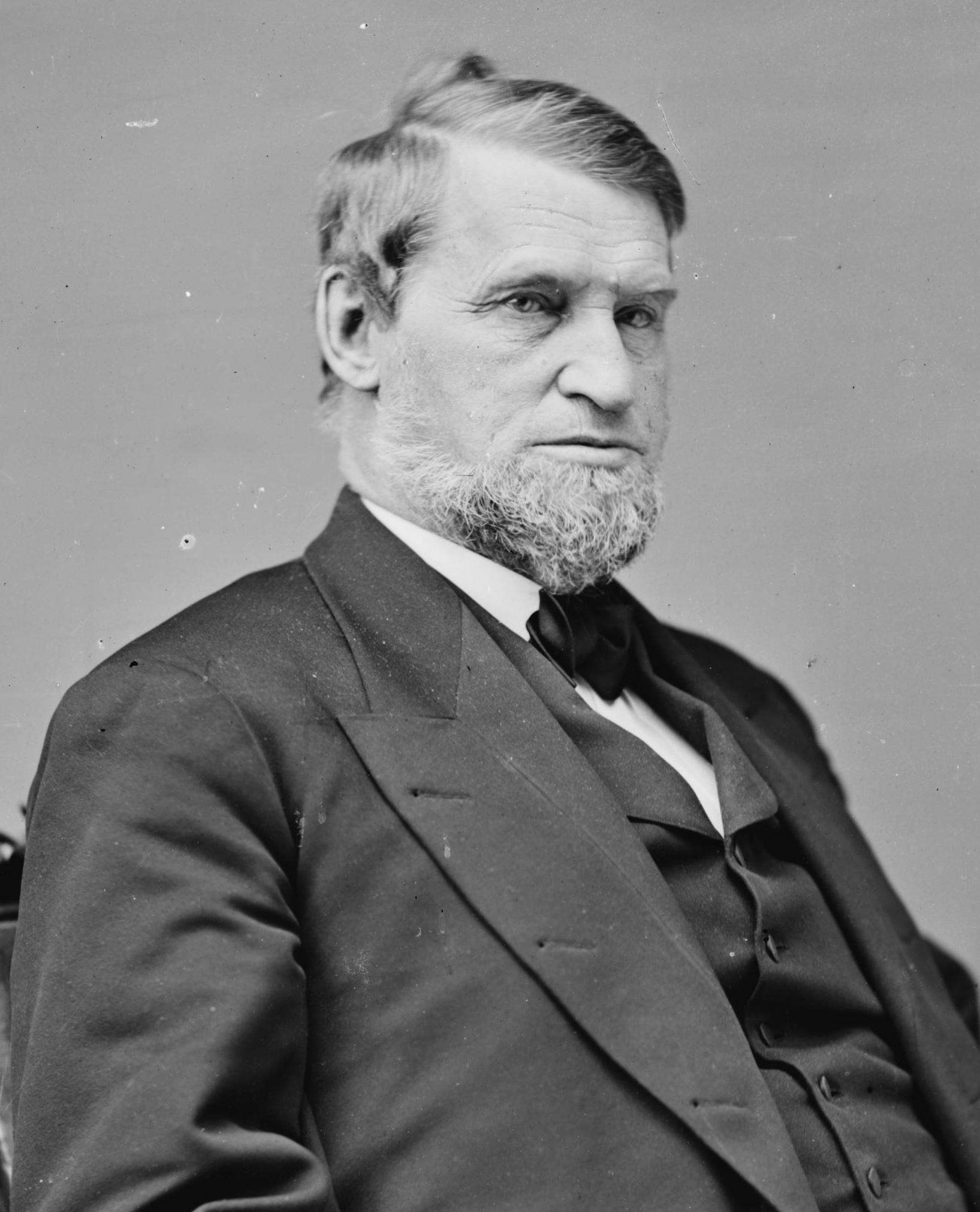
Oakes Ames, United States Congressman of Massachusetts and a central figure in the Union Pacific Railroad.

The descendants of Thomas Ames, known for the Ames Manufacturing Company and Ames True Temper which was the source of their wealth, have principally been associated with North Easton, Massachusetts. Stonehill College maintains the Ames Family Collection, containing documents related to the Thomas Ames branch dating from the 19th to 20th centuries. They were donated to the college in 2000 by Elizabeth M. Ames, and later supplemented by additional deposits from other family members.

- John Ames (1738-1805), military officer and industrialist
- Oliver Ames Sr. (1779-1863), industrialist
- Oakes Ames (1804-1873), member of the United States Congress
- Oliver Ames Jr. (1807-1877), president of the Union Pacific Railroad
- John Ames Mitchell (1845-1918), architect
- Oakes Angier Ames (1829-1899), industrialist
- Oliver Ames (1831–1895), governor of Massachusetts
- Frederick Lothrop Ames (1835-1893), member of the Massachusetts General Court
- Winthrop Ames (1870-1937), producer and playwright
- Oakes Ames (1874-1950), botanist
- Frederick Lothrop Ames Jr. (1876-1921), socialite

==== Family tree ====
- John Ames / Susannah Howard

- David Ames
- Oliver Ames Sr. / Susannah Angier

- Oakes Ames / Evelina Orville Gilmore

- Oakes Angier Ames

- Winthrop Ames

- Oliver Ames / Anna Coffin Ray

- Oakes Ames (botanist) / Blanche Ames Ames

- Oliver Ames Jr. / Sarah Lothrop

- Frederick Lothrop Ames / Rebecca Blair

- Frederick Lothrop Ames Jr. / Edith Cryder

- Harriet Ames (1819-1896) / Asa Mitchell (1819-1877)

- John Ames Mitchell

== Financial holdings ==
The following is a list of businesses in which the Ames family have held a controlling or otherwise significant interest.

- Ames Manufacturing Company
- Ames Shovel Works
- Annin & Co.
- Booth Theatre
- Crédit Mobilier of America
- D.& J. Ames Paper
- General Electric
- Life (magazine)
- Old Colony Railroad
- Union Pacific Railroad
- United States Cartridge Company

== Buildings, estates & historical sites ==
- Ames Building
- Ames Free Library
- Ames Gate Lodge
- Ames Monument
- Ames Shovel Shop
- Borderland
- F. L. Ames Gardener's Cottage
- Oakes Ames Memorial Hall
- Queset House
