= Ames True Temper =

Manufacturing company which produces non-powered lawn and garden products

Ames True Temper, Inc.
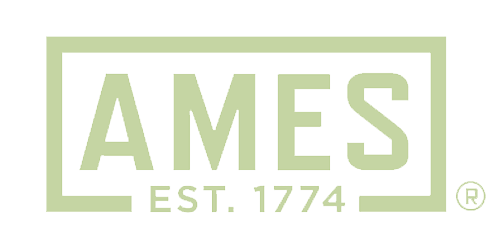
- Type: Subsidiary
- Industry: Landscaping tools
- Predecessor: American Fork and Hoe Co.; Ames, Baldwin, Wyoming Co.; Ames Shovel and Tool Co.; Baldwin Tool Works; Hubbard & Co; O. Ames Company; The Old Stone Forge; Pittsburgh Shovel Co.; True Temper Co.; Wyoming Shovel Works
- Founded: 1774; 252 years ago
- Founder: Captain John Ames
- Headquarters: Camp Hill, Pennsylvania, U.S.
- Area served: North America
- Parent: Griffon Corporation
- Website: Ames.com

Ames True Temper, Inc. is a multinational corporation headquartered in Camp Hill, Pennsylvania, U.S. It is a wholly owned subsidiary of Griffon Corporation. Ames True Temper specializes in the manufacture of non-powered lawn and garden products. Its manufacturing plant was located in Harrisburg, Pennsylvania, and produced 85% of the wheelbarrows in the United States and Canada making 1.7 million wheelbarrows each year, until Griffon decided to outsource production to China. The Harrisburg plant had been in continual operation since 1876.

Ames, which celebrated its 200th anniversary in 1974, is among the oldest extant business corporations in the United States.

== History ==
=== Formation ===
Blacksmith and pioneer Captain John Ames began making metal shovels in America in 1774. Ames underwent a merger in 1931 including the Baldwin Tool Works of Parkersburg, West Virginia; the Ames Shovel and Tool Company of North Easton, Massachusetts; the Wyoming Shovel Works of Wyoming, Pennsylvania; Hubbard & Co. of Pittsburgh, Pennsylvania; and the Pittsburgh Shovel Co. of Pittsburgh, Pennsylvania. It later absorbed the Skelton Shovel Co. Inc. of Dunkirk, New York. The result of the merger was called the Ames Shovel and Tool Company. The company was renamed the Ames, Baldwin, Wyoming Company in 1933. In 1952, it became known as the O. Ames Company.

The Old Stone Forge of Wallingford, Vermont, founded in 1808, became the American Fork and Hoe Co. In 1949, the name was changed to True Temper. Ames purchased True Temper from the Huffy Corporation in 1999 to become Ames True Temper.

In 2002, Ames, then based in Camp Hill, Pennsylvania closed one of its two plants manufacturing lawn and garden tools in Wood County, West Virginia.

In 2023, Ames closed the Harrisburg, Pennsylvania plant where President Trump commemorated his 100th day in office of his first term. Later in the year they also closed the Hampden Township/ Camp Hill Plant in Hershey, Pennsylvania.

In 2024, the AMES companies celebrated their 250th anniversary marking 25 decades of supplying tools for major infrastructure projects such as the transcontinental railroad, the Hoover Dam, and the Statue Of Liberty.

=== Problems and controversies ===
Ames True Temper Company closed its facility in West Virginia in September 2005, unable to reach a contract agreement with the United Steelworkers Union.

== Brands ==
Ames True Temper, as at 2012, owned the following brands:

- Ames
- ClosetMaid
- Dynamic Design
- Garant
- Harper
- Hound Dog
- Jackson
- Razor-Back
- Southern Patio
- True Temper
- Union Tools
- Westmix

== See also ==
- Ames Shovel Shop
- Oakes Ames
- Oliver Ames Jr.
