= Frederick Lothrop Ames =

American politician (1835–1893)

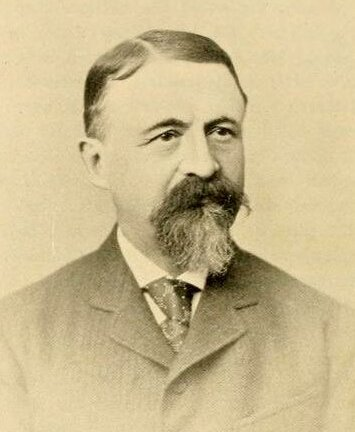

Member of the Massachusetts Senate
- In office 1873–1873

Personal details
- Born: June 8, 1835 Easton, Massachusetts, US
- Died: September 13, 1893 (aged 58) Fall River, Massachusetts, US
- Spouse: Rebecca C. Blair
- Children: Frederick Lothrop Ames Jr.
- Parent(s): Oliver Ames Jr., Sarah Lothrop
- Relatives: Capt. John Ames great-grandfather Oliver Ames Sr. grandfather Oakes Ames Uncle; Oliver Ames cousin
- Education: Phillips Exeter Academy
- Alma mater: Harvard College
- Occupation: Vice President of the Old Colony Railroad and director of the Union Pacific Railroad
- Known for: Wealthiest person in Massachusetts
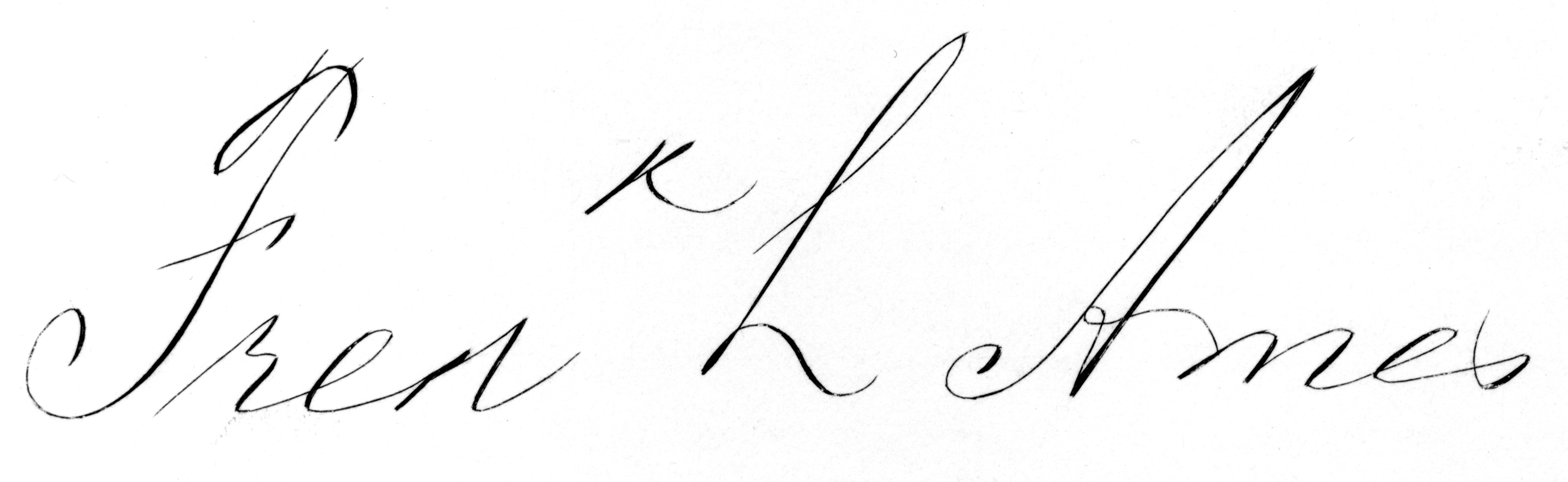
- Signature

Frederick Lothrop Ames (June 8, 1835 – September 13, 1893) was heir to a fortune in railroads and shovel manufacturing. He was Vice President of the Old Colony Railroad, a director of the Union Pacific railroad, and a co-founder of General Electric. At the time of his death, Ames was reported to be the wealthiest person in Massachusetts.

== Ames Family ==
The Ames family was a wealthy family which had lived in Easton for many generations. Frederick's grandfather Oliver Ames Sr. founded the Ames Shovel Works in Easton, Massachusetts. The Shovel Works earned the family a huge fortune, during a time when aggressive canal and railroad expansion was built by the hands of thousands of men using shovels. Frederick's father Oliver Jr. was president of the Union Pacific Railroad during the building of the transcontinental railroad. Frederick's cousin Oliver Ames was governor of Massachusetts 1887–1890.

== Biography ==
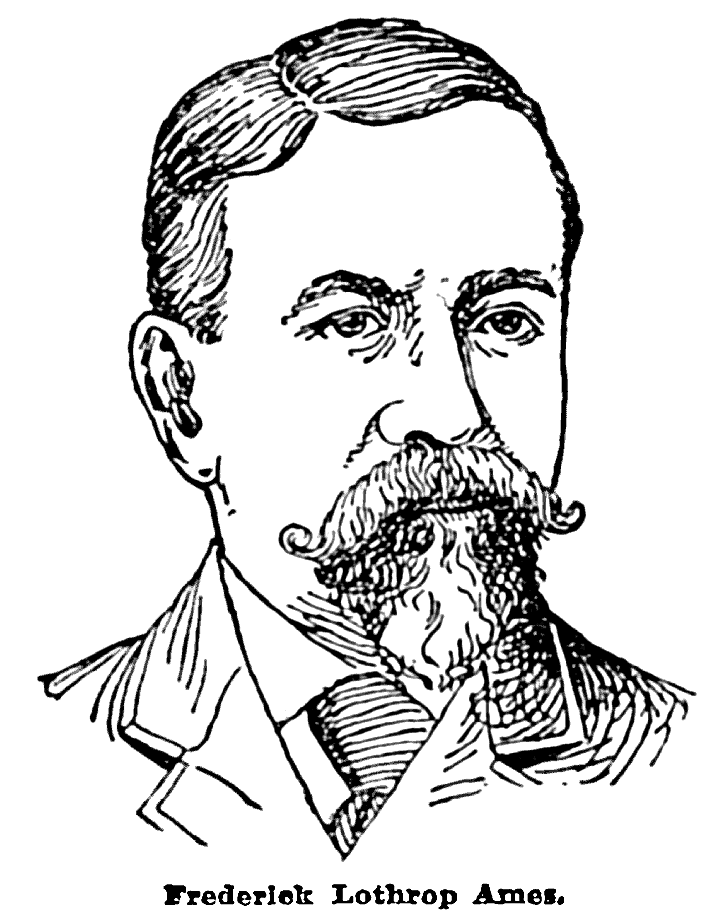
Sketch of Ames from his New York Times obituary

Frederick Lothrop Ames was born June 8, 1835, in Easton, Massachusetts, the only son of Oliver Ames Jr. and Sarah Lothrop. Sarah's father was Hon. Howard Lothrop, of Easton, who was a State Senator; and her brother was George Van Ness Lothrop, minister to Russia during the Grover Cleveland administration.

Young Frederick attended Phillips Exeter Academy and graduated from Harvard College in 1854. Although he wished to study law, he was persuaded by his father to join the family shovel business. On the death of his grandfather Oliver Ames Sr., he became a member of the firm. In 1876, he became treasurer. On the death of his father in 1877, Frederick became head of the Ames & Sons Corporation; he also inherited five or six million dollars, which he invested in railroads.

He married Rebecca Caroline Blair on June 7, 1860 and they had five children. The children were: Helen Angier; Oliver; Mary Shreve; Frederick Lothrop Jr.; and John Stanley Ames.

The family had a winter home on Commonwealth Avenue in Boston and their main home was an estate in North Easton, Massachusetts. In 1893 Ames commissioned the 13-story Ames Building in Boston, considered Boston's first skyscraper and its first elevator-dependent building. Ames worked from his offices there. At the time it was the tallest building east of New York City.

Ames stood about five feet 11 inches, and weighed about 175 pounds. He was a Unitarian and member of both the Unity Church of North Easton and the First Church in Boston.

He was president of the Home for Incurables (the hospital changed its name to St Barnabas Hospital in 1947), of the Massachusetts General Hospital, and of the McLean Insane Asylum (now called the McLean Hospital).

== Business interests ==
Ames was Vice President of the Old Colony Railroad and director of the Union Pacific Railroad. All told, he served as director of forty railroads, probably more than any other person in the country. He was a director in the Old Colony Steamboat Company. He also owned over six million dollars in Boston real estate, as well as real estate in Kansas City and Omaha. At the time of his death at age 58, Ames' wealth was estimated at somewhere between 25 and 50 million dollars.

=== Art collector and architecture patron ===
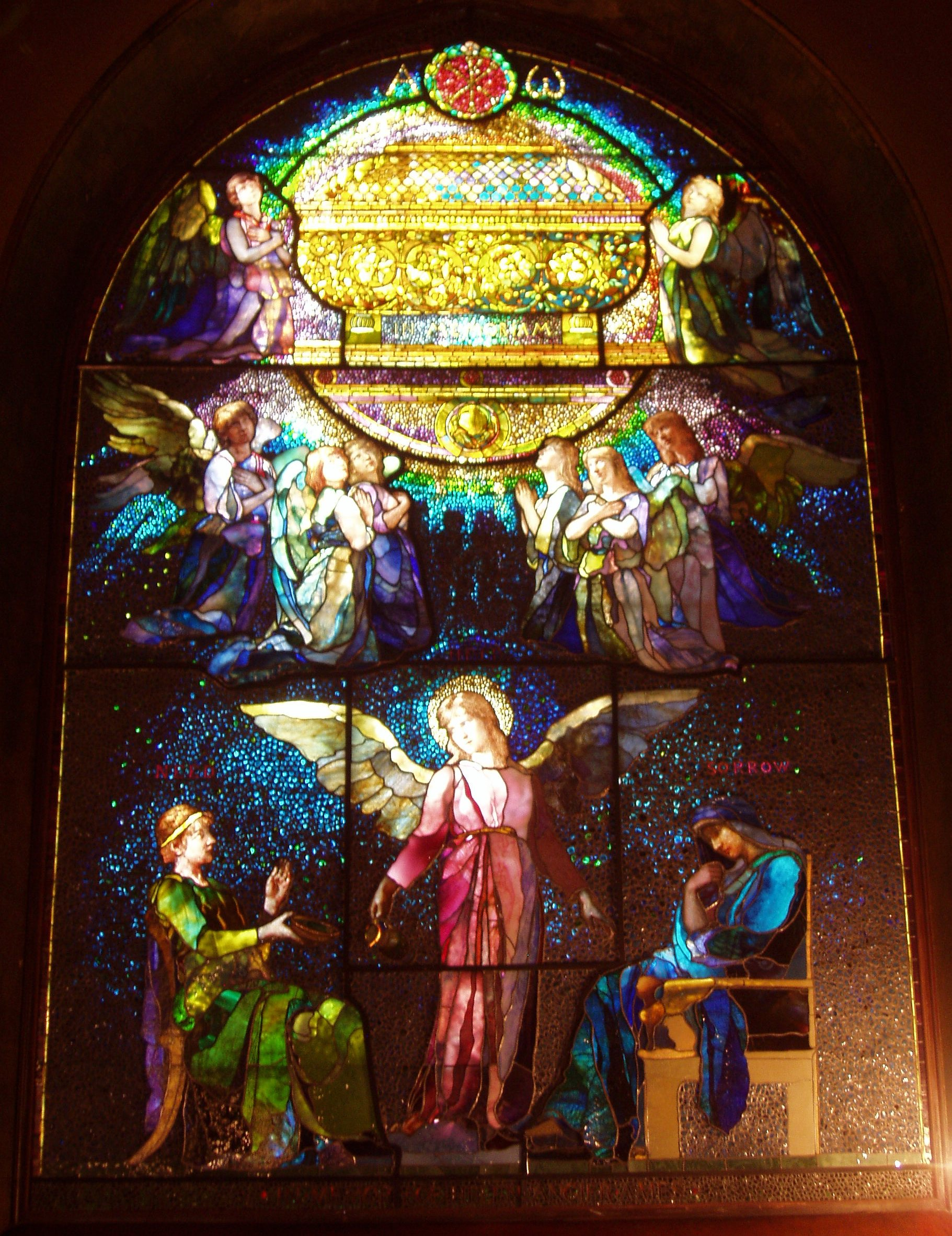
Angel of Help by John La Farge, commissioned by Ames to honor his late sister Helen

Ames was known widely as an art collector. He was a trustee of Boston's Museum of Fine Art, and gave the museum a number of artworks including several large jades and crystals. Ames also donated two Rembrandts, portraits of Dr. Nicolaes Tulp and his wife dated 1632.

Ames' collection also included "Pointer Dog" by Constant Troyon, "Tiger Hunt" by Eugène Fromentin, several landscapes by Charles-François Daubigny, and several other paintings by French Romanticists. On October 6, 1885, the Ames estate in North Easton was robbed of several paintings, including "Teybeck at Brousic" by Stanisław Chlebowski, and "Goose Girl" by Jean-François Millet.

In 1882, Ames commissioned artist John La Farge to design a large stained glass window in Unity Church of North Easton as a memorial to his only sister, Helen Angier Ames. The work is called Angel of Help.

Frederick (and others in the Ames family) commissioned architect Henry Hobson Richardson to build several buildings. The first was Ames Free Library, built with a $50,000 bequest from his father (Oliver Jr.)'s will. Construction was started 1878 and completed 1883. Perhaps the most notable was the Ames Building in Boston, built by Richardson's firm after his death. It was for many years the tallest skyscraper in Boston.

=== Orchids ===
Ames was also an avid amateur orchid gardener, an interest which he shared with his nephew, professional botanist Oakes Ames. Frederick's collection of orchids was considered one of the finest in the country. The orchid amesianus was named in honor of both Frederick and Oakes.

Ames was a generous donor to Harvard's Arnold Arboretum and a vice president of the Massachusetts Horticultural Society. He was a member of the corporation of Harvard University at the time of his death.

=== Politics ===
Ames was elected to the Massachusetts State Senate in 1872 "in his absence and without his knowledge." He served one term as a Republican.

== Death and legacy ==
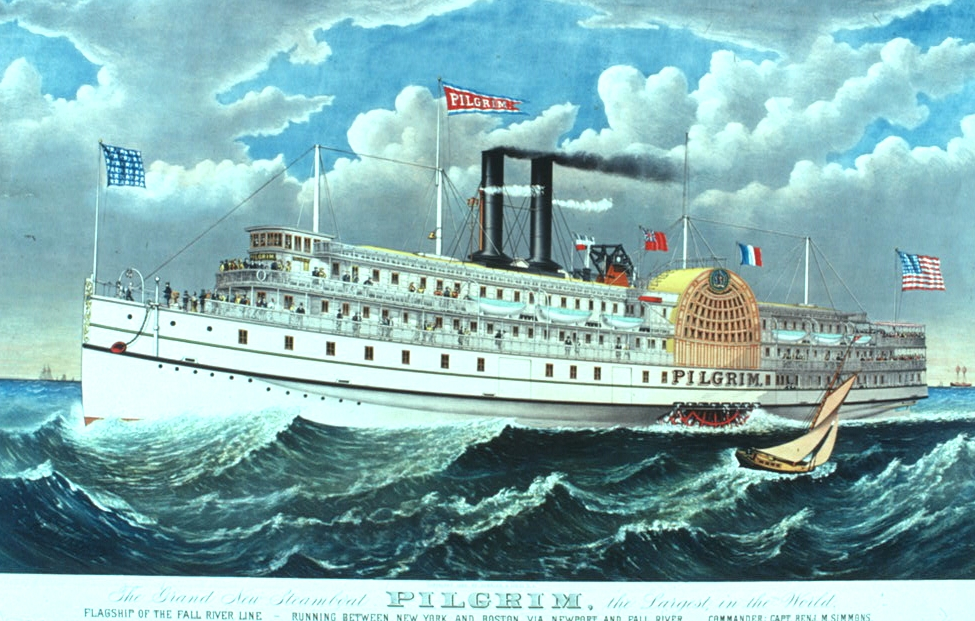
Ames died aboard the steamboat Pilgrim

Ames died suddenly aboard his steamboat Pilgrim sometime early in the morning of September 13, 1893 en route to Fall River, Massachusetts. He went to bed "in the best of health and spirits" but was found dead the following morning. The cause was reported to be cerebral apoplexy, a condition which would later be called a stroke.

== See also ==
- Ames Gate Lodge
- F. L. Ames Gardener's Cottage
- Ames Building
- Ames family
- Old Colony Railroad Station (North Easton, Massachusetts)
- 93rd Massachusetts General Court (1872)
