= David Ames (colonel) =

American armory superintendent

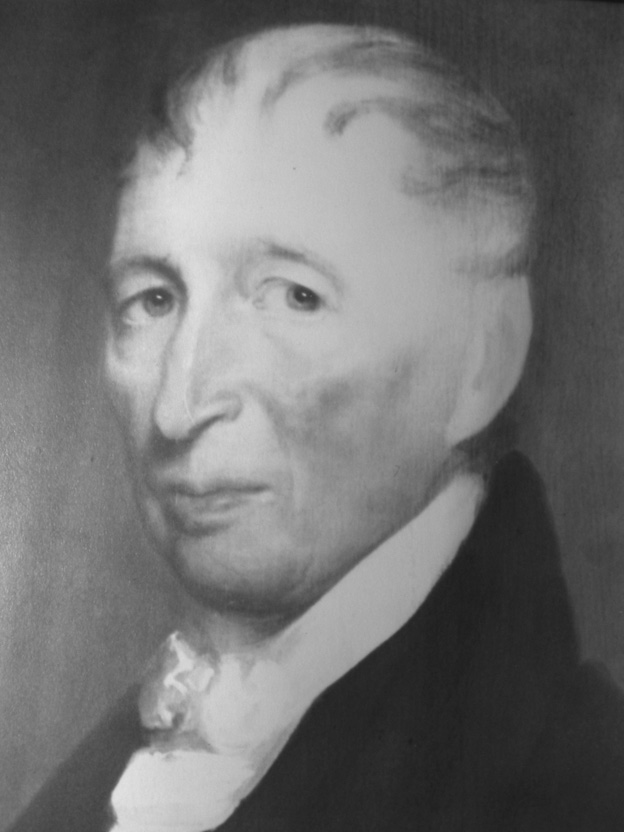
- Born: February 2, 1760; Bridgewater, Massachusetts
- Died: August 6, 1847 (aged 87)
- Known for: Springfield Armory
- Parent(s): John Ames (captain), Susanna Howard
- Relatives: Oliver Ames Sr. (brother)

Signature
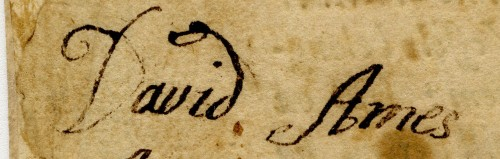

David Ames (February 2, 1760 - August 6, 1847) served as first superintendent of the Springfield Armory in Springfield, Massachusetts, from 1794 to October 31, 1802. He supplied the American army with shovels and guns during the American Revolution and was commissioned in the militia. Upon completion of service at the Armory, he entered the paper-manufacturing business and by 1838 was proprietor of the most extensive paper manufacturing operation in the United States.

== Family ==
David Ames was born to John Ames (captain) (April 7, 1738 - June 17, 1805) and Susanna (Howard) Ames (May 14, 1759 - January 11, 1821), both of Bridgewater, Massachusetts. His father was a prominent blacksmith who manufactured shovels and guns both prior to and during the American Revolution. His younger brother, Oliver Ames Sr. (April 11, 1779 - September 11, 1863), founded the Oliver Ames Shovel Company of North Easton, Massachusetts, in 1803. Other siblings include Susannah (Fobes), Keziah (Packard), Huldah (Willis), Abigail (Lazell), Cynthia and John. Susannah had triplet siblings, both died in infancy.

== Early life ==
At fifteen years old, David held a commission in the local militia during the American Revolution. Having apprenticed under iron worker and gunsmith Hugh Orr of Bridgewater, Massachusetts, he gained knowledge of colonial artillery and supplied guns and shovels valuable to the war effort. Records show that he and Oliver assisted their father in shovel sales outside Bridgewater. In 1796, Oliver delivered 15 dozen shovels to David, who was to sell them for at least eight dollars per dozen in Hartford, Connecticut.

== Business ==
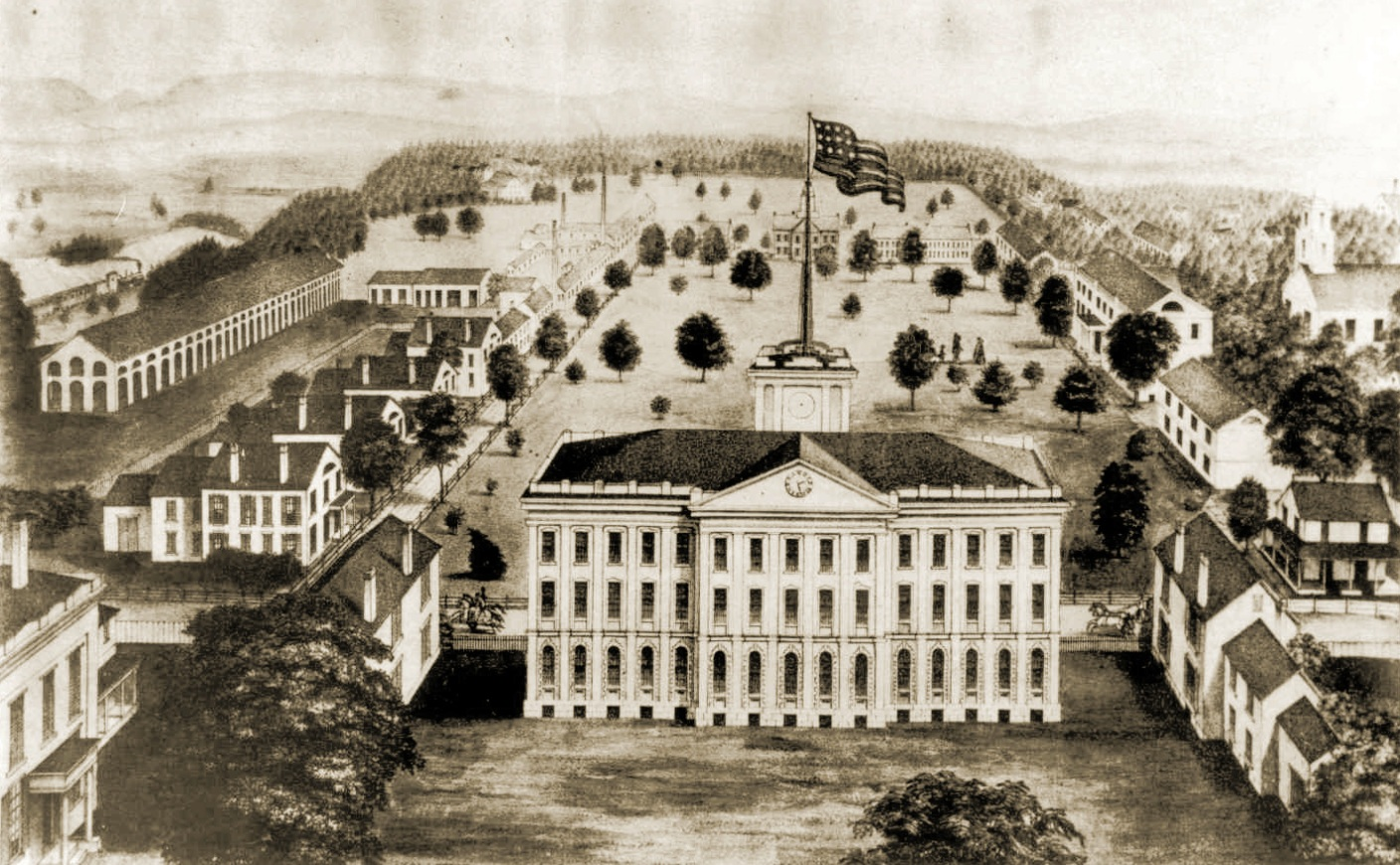
Springfield Armory in 1850

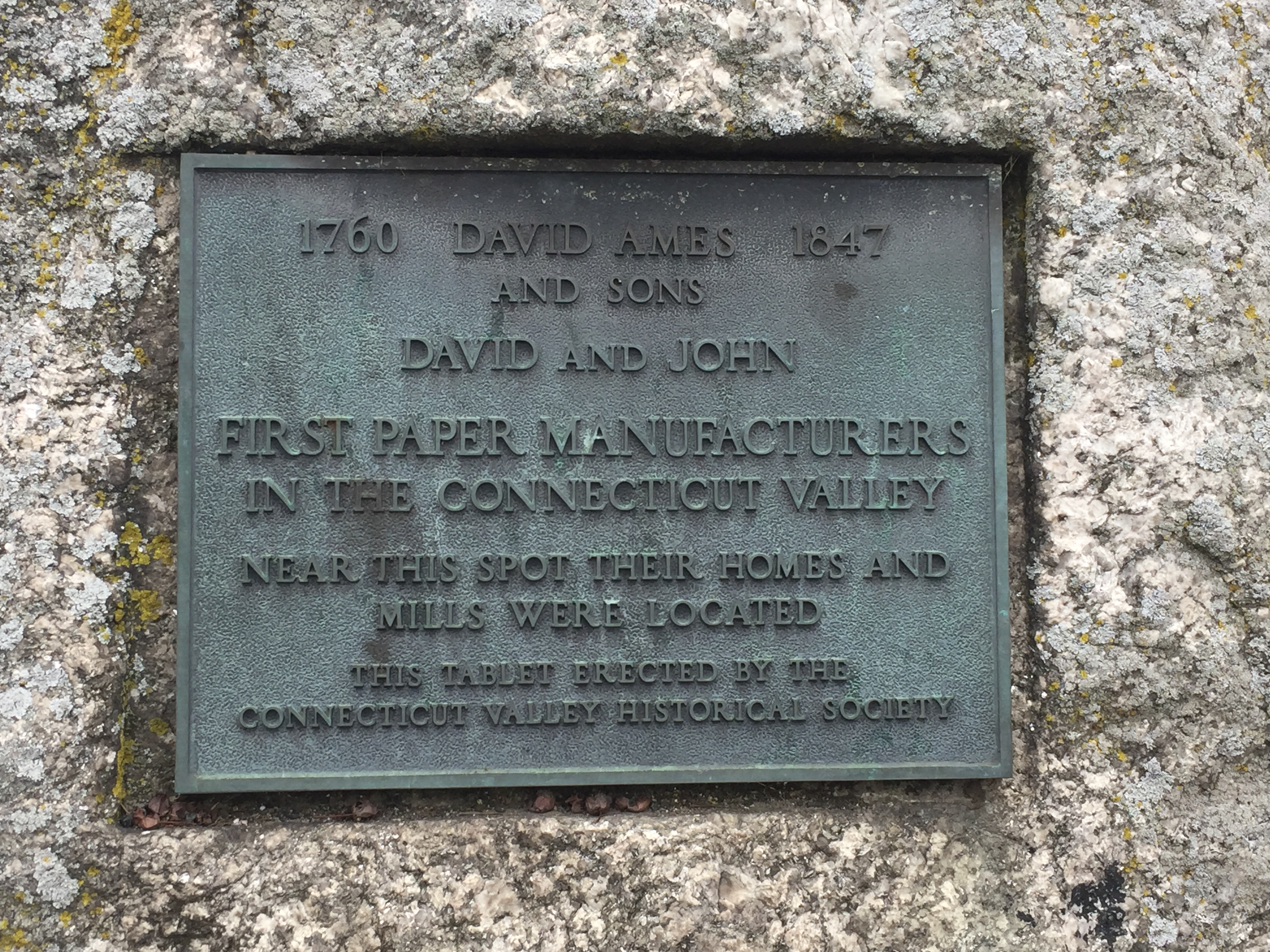
Tablet commemorating David Ames and sons contributions to industry in the Connecticut Valley

=== Springfield Armory ===
The Springfield Armory provided the American Armed Forces with weapons and state-of-the-art weapons engineering for nearly two hundred years. George Washington appointed David to Superintendent of the newly created Armory in 1794. He resigned on October 31, 1802.

=== Paper Manufacturing ===
In 1802, David bought a mill on the bank of the Mill River (Northampton, Massachusetts) in Springfield, MA. He tore down the original mill and erected a new one that would last for 75 years. Sons David Jr. and John went on to become successful in the paper manufacturing business under the name D. & J. Ames Paper. The Ames family established mills in Suffield, Connecticut, Northampton, South Hadley Falls and Chicopee Falls. John obtained the Ames Cylinder Paper-Making Machine patent on May 14, 1822. The patent documentation on sheepskin was signed by President Andrew Jackson. It revolutionized the process by which a constantly moving cylinder was covered in mesh and, half submerged in the vat of pulp, produced a continuous sheet of paper material. It enabled one man to do the work of thirty. On May 18, 1917, the Connecticut Valley Historical Society commemorated the Ames achievement as first paper manufacturers in the Connecticut Valley. Four generations of descendants were in attendance for the unveiling of a tablet, located at the corner of Maple St. and Mill St. in Springfield, Massachusetts.

== Personal ==
David married Rebecca Johnson (December 26, 1758 - June 29, 1834), daughter of Major Isaac and Mary (Willis) Johnson of Bridgewater, MA, on November 15, 1781. They had nine children:

- Lucinda Ames born February 15, 1782, married Benjamin Lamphear
- Mary Ames born September 9, 1784
- Rebecca Ames born December 5, 1786, married James Wells
- Susanna Ames born July 23, 1789, married Edward Pynchon
- David Ames Jr. born August 24, 1791, married Mary Orr Mitchell
- Abigail Ames born August 3, 1794, married Robert McDermott
- Galen Ames born July 21, 1796, married (1) Eliza Kent, (2) Elizabeth Wilson Little
- Charlotte Ames born September 5, 1798, married (1) Nathan Oakes, (2) Ephraim Bullard
- John Ames born September 2, 1800

== Bibliography ==
- "Tablet Unveiled David Ames Honored Pioneer Paper Maker", The Republican, Springfield, MA, p. 2E, May 19, 1917
- "Western New England". Springfield Board of Trade. 1 (1): 3. December 1910.
- Chapin, Charles, W. (1893), Sketches of the Old Inhabitants and Other Citizens of Old Springfield of the Present Century, and It's Historic Mansions of "Ye Olden Tyme", Springfield, MA: Press of Springfield printing and binding company.
- Chaplin, Ann T. (2004),Descendents of William Ames of Braintree, Massachusetts, Newbury Street Press ISBN 0-88082-182-5.
- Galer, Greg (2002), Forging Ahead: The Ames Family of Easton, Massachusetts and Two Centuries of Industrial Enterprise, 1635-1861, Massachusetts Institute of Technology
- Stone, Orra L. (1930),History of Massachusetts Industries: Their Inception, Growth, and Success, Vol. 1, Boston-Chicago: S. J. Clarke Publishing Company ISBN 0-88289-048-4.
- Weeks, Lyman H. (1969), A History of Paper-Manufacturing in the United States, 1690-1916, Ayer Company Publishing ISBN 0-83373-715-5.
- Whittlesey, Derwent, Lt. (1920), A History of Springfield Armory, University of Chicago
