= John Ames (captain) =

Captain John Ames
- Born: April 7, 1738; Bridgewater, Plymouth County, Province of Massachusetts Bay, Thirteen Colonies
- Died: June 17, 1805 (aged 67); Bridgewater, Plymouth County, Massachusetts, United States
- Spouse(s): Susannah Ames, née Howard
- Children: 8 including, Oliver Ames Sr.; David Ames
- Relatives: Ames family; Sylvanus Ames (brother); Oliver Ames Jr. (grandson); Oakes Ames (grandson); Frederick Lothrop Ames (great-grandson); John Ames Mitchell (great-grandson); Oakes Ames (great-grandson); Winthrop Ames (great-grandson); Frederick Lothrop Ames Jr. (great-great-grandson)
- Military career
- Known for: Founder of the Ames Manufacturing Company
- Other work: Blacksmith; gunsmith

Capt. John Ames (April 7, 1738 – June 17, 1805) was an American blacksmith, gunsmith, and member of the Ames family.

== Biography ==
John Ames was born April 7, 1738, in Bridgewater to Thomas Ames and Keziah Ames, née Howard. Ames' brother Sylvanus Ames (1744–1778) was the rector of Trinity Church in Taunton.

In 1759, Ames married Susanna Howard. Their children were:

- David Ames (1760–1847)
- Keziah Packard, née Ames
- Susanna Fobes, née Ames
- Huldah Willis, née Ames (1768–)
- Abigail Lazell, née Ames (1769–)
- Cynthia Ames (1772–)
- John Ames (1775–)
- Oliver Ames Sr. (1779–1863)

=== Blacksmith ===
Ames was a blacksmith in Bridgewater, Massachusetts. After the "nail and splitting mills" were outlawed by the government in Great Britain to give iron manufacturers in Britain a monopoly in 1773, Ames switched to making shovels. Despite having only a crude factory, he was able to make shovels of notable quality. In fact, he was said to have developed a shovel "so perfect that further improvement seems impossible."

The remains of his trip hammer stone and man-made weirs and dams can be seen at War Memorial Park in West Bridgewater.

=== Revolutionary War ===
John Ames made guns for the Massachusetts army during the American Revolutionary War.

During the war, Ames served in the Massachusetts Militia. In December 1776, the Militia was sent to Newport, Rhode Island, to try to prevent British troops from securing a stronghold. Ames served 15 days alongside two of Washington's generals (one being Benedict Arnold). In June 1778, they returned to Newport to assist a French fleet in attacks against the British but were sent home after 24 days when the Continental Army under Gilbert du Motier, Marquis de Lafayette did not arrive. The last documented service was in July 1780, when Admiral de Ternay (Charles-Henri-Louis d'Arsac de Ternay) landed 6,000 French troops in Rhode Island and the Militia was sent to protect them from the British. He served as captain in Colonel Edward Mitchell's Regiment in 1776; as captain in Colonel Wade's Regiment, 1778; captain in Major Eliphalet Carey's Regiment, 1780; and Second Major of the 3d Regiment, 1780. Despite being promoted to major, he was known as "captain" for the rest of his life.

Captain John Ames died in Bridgewater, Massachusetts. At least one source lists his date of death as July 17, 1803. This is probably an error as other sources state the date of death as July 17, 1805, and his tombstone states he died "in his 68th year".

== Ames family and legacy ==
The Ames family eventually became a very influential and wealthy family in Massachusetts, establishing two factories as well as having influence in the American railroad expansion and government. Capt. John's son, David Ames (born 1760), was appointed by George Washington to be the first head of the Springfield Armory.

Two factories were started by descendants of Capt. John Ames, in different regions of Massachusetts. Ames' son, Oliver, went on to found the Ames Shovel Shop in Easton, Massachusetts. Ames' descendants, brothers James Tyler Ames and Nathan Peabody Ames, went on to found the Ames Manufacturing Company in Chicopee, Massachusetts in 1835. His great-grandson Oliver Ames became governor of Massachusetts, 1887–1890.
