= Louis Annin Ames =

American flagmaker (1866–1952)

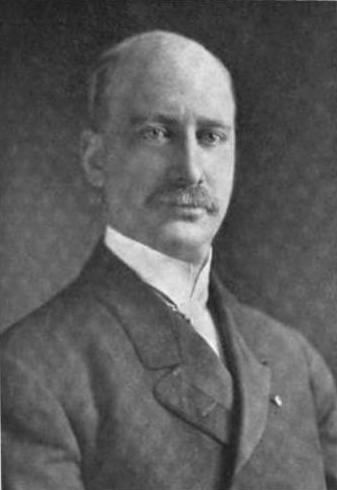
- Ames in 1916
- Born: September 5, 1866; Saint Helena Island, South Carolina, US
- Died: November 28, 1952 (aged 86); Essex Fells, New Jersey, US
- Resting place: Kensico Cemetery
- Occupation: Flagmaker
- Spouse: Abby Whitney Crowell (m. 1909)

Louis Annin Ames (January 20, 1866 – November 28, 1952) was an American flagmaker. From 1896 to 1952, he was chief executive officer of Annin & Co. In 1915, he designed the flag of the City of New York. He was a member of the Ames family and w as the President General of the Sons of the American Revolution. He also was the twenty-second Governor General of the Order of the Founders and Patriots of America from 1935 to 1937.

== Biography ==
Louis Annin Ames was born on Saint Helena Island, South Carolina on September 5, 1866.

He married Abby Whitney Crowell on January 20, 1909, and they had two children.

He died at his home in Essex Fells, New Jersey on November 28, 1952, aged 86. He was buried at Kensico Cemetery in Valhalla, New York.
