= Oliver Ames Sr. =

American industrialist

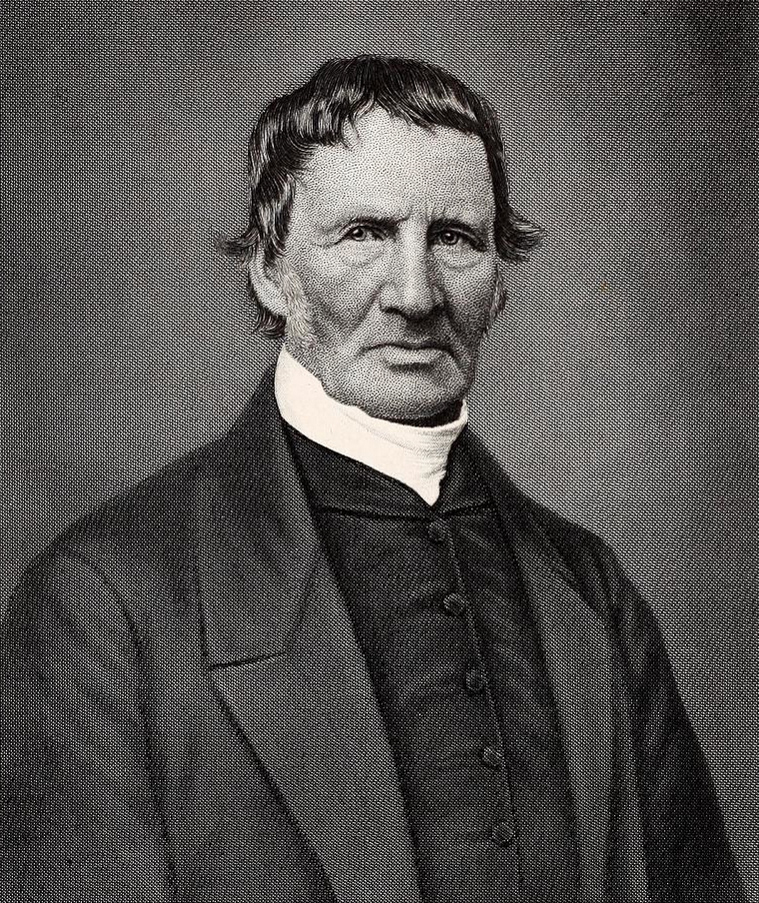
- Born: April 11, 1779; West Bridgewater, Massachusetts
- Died: September 11, 1863 (aged 84); North Easton, Massachusetts
- Other names: Old Oliver
- Known for: Ames Shovel Works
- Spouse: Susannah Angier
- Children: Oakes Ames; Oliver Ames Jr.
- Parent(s): Capt. John Ames; Susannah Howard
- Relatives: Frederick Lothrop Ames (grandson); Governor Oliver Ames (grandson); John Ames Mitchell (grandson)

Oliver Ames Sr. (April 11, 1779 – September 11, 1863) was the family patriarch of the Ames family of Easton, Massachusetts. He established the family shovel business, which over generations grew to become one of the largest family fortunes in New England.

== Biography ==
Ames was born April 11, 1779, to Capt. John Ames and Susannah Howard, in West Bridgewater, Massachusetts. His father was a blacksmith who provided guns for the Revolutionary army, and made a name for himself making shovels of high quality.

Oliver began his career in Springfield, working for his elder brother David at the newly established Springfield Armory. David, a gunsmith like their father, was appointed by George Washington as the armory's first superintendent. In 1802, David's term ended and Oliver returned to Bridgewater.

Ames moved to Easton, Massachusetts, in 1803 and bought a nail-making business, and converted it into a shovel factory. This factory eventually grew into the Ames Shovel Works, a major business in Easton, and the source of a great family fortune.

From 1807 to 1814, Ames supervised the shovel-making plant at Plymouth Iron Works, but returned to his own shop in Easton, where business slowly grew. In 1844, Ames turned the business over to his sons Oakes Ames and Oliver Ames Jr., and renamed the firm Oliver Ames & Sons. Ames gave each of his sons one-quarter interest in the company, retaining a third for himself.

Ames died at North Easton, Massachusetts, on September 11, 1863, aged 84.

=== Politics ===
Ames was a member of the Massachusetts House of Representatives from 1828 to 1829 and again from 1833 to 1834, and served as state senator in 1845.

=== Religion ===
Ames was an active Unitarian, and helped establish the Unitarian society in Easton.

== Family ==
Ames married Susannah Angier, daughter of Oakes Angier, a prominent lawyer, in April 1803. Ames was said to be fond of wrestling and feats of strength.

Ames died in Easton on September 11, 1863. On his death, his sons Oakes and Oliver took over the Shovel Works with grandson Frederick Lothrop Ames.

== See also ==
- Oliver Ames Jr.
- Oakes Ames
- Ames Shovel Shop
- Ames True Temper
- Frederick Lothrop Ames
- Frederick Lothrop Ames Jr.
