= Ellis Ames =

American judge

Ellis Ames (1809-1886) was an American lawyer and politician who sat in the Massachusetts General Court from 1833 to 1836. He was educated at Bridgewater Academy and Brown University. Ellis Ames was a member of the Ames family, descended from William Ames.
