= Ames Shovel Shop =

- U.S. Historic district – Contributing property
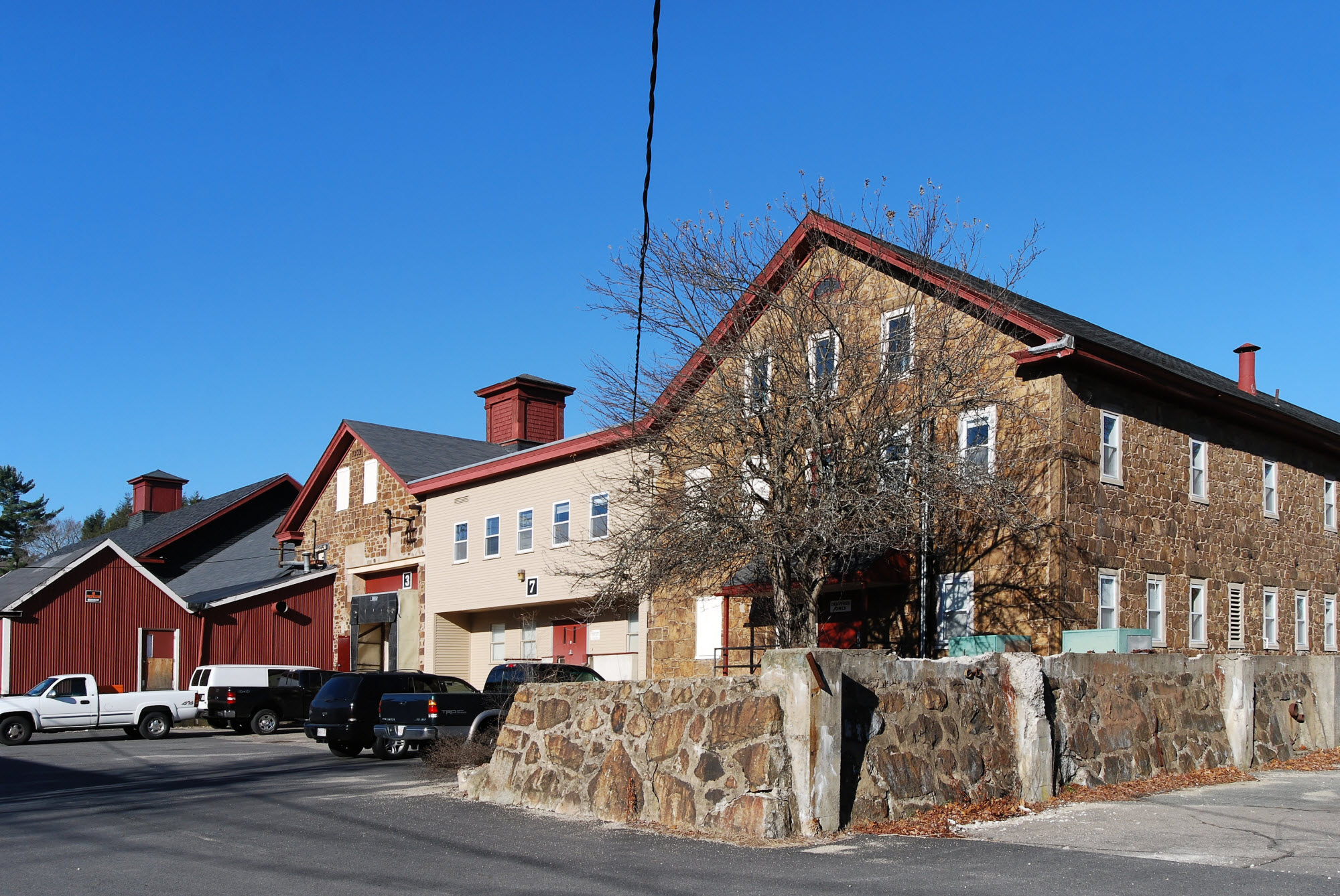
- A view of the 1870 Store House (right) and 1852 Long Shop (center, with red cupola), from the southeast corner of the complex

- Location within Massachusetts Location within the United States
- Location: Easton, Massachusetts
- Coordinates: 42°4′7″N 71°6′15″W
- Part of: North Easton Historic District (ID72000119)
- Added to NRHP: November 3, 1972

The Ames Shovel Shops, also known as Ames Shovel Works or Ames Shovel Shop, is a historic 19th century industrial complex located in North Easton, Massachusetts. It is part of the North Easton Historic District, and consists of several granite buildings constructed between 1852 and 1885, along with several newer additions and outbuildings dating to about 1928.

The site is adjacent to the H. H. Richardson Historic District of North Easton, which includes several buildings designed by architect Henry Hobson Richardson, commissioned by the Ames family, owners of the shovel company.

In April 2009, the shops were named one of the 11 most endangered historic sites in the United States, by the National Trust for Historic Preservation, due to the pending proposal to redevelop the main portion of the site into residences.

However, in November 2009, an agreement was reached for a scaled-down development, endorsed by the National Trust. Construction began in April 2012, and was expected to take about 18 months; the project was completed in 2015.

== Historical background ==
The Ames Shovel Company traces its origins to 1774 when Capt. John Ames began making iron shovels at West Bridgewater, Massachusetts. His son Oliver Ames Sr. moved the company to North Easton in 1803. In 1844, the elder Ames would transfer the shovel business to two of his sons, Oakes and Oliver Jr., and the company would become known as Oliver Ames & Sons. Within the next few years, gold would be discovered in California in 1848, and in Australia in 1851, creating a worldwide demand for the company's shovels, which were already known for their high quality.

In 1851, the original shovel shop was destroyed by fire. The company would soon rebuild, and by 1852 the first of the new shops had been completed. Strong demand for shovels would continue through this period with the great expansion of railroads and later the American Civil War. Abraham Lincoln personally asked Oakes Ames to supply shovels to the Union Army. This made the Ames brothers very wealthy men. The Ames brothers entered politics and became influential in financing the construction of the Union Pacific Railroad, as well as the development of the village of North Easton. Expansion of the shovel factory continued over the years until 1928.

Ames shovels became standard issue for troops in the U.S. Army for every conflict from the American Civil War to Korea.

The Ames Shovel Company ceased production in Easton in 1952.

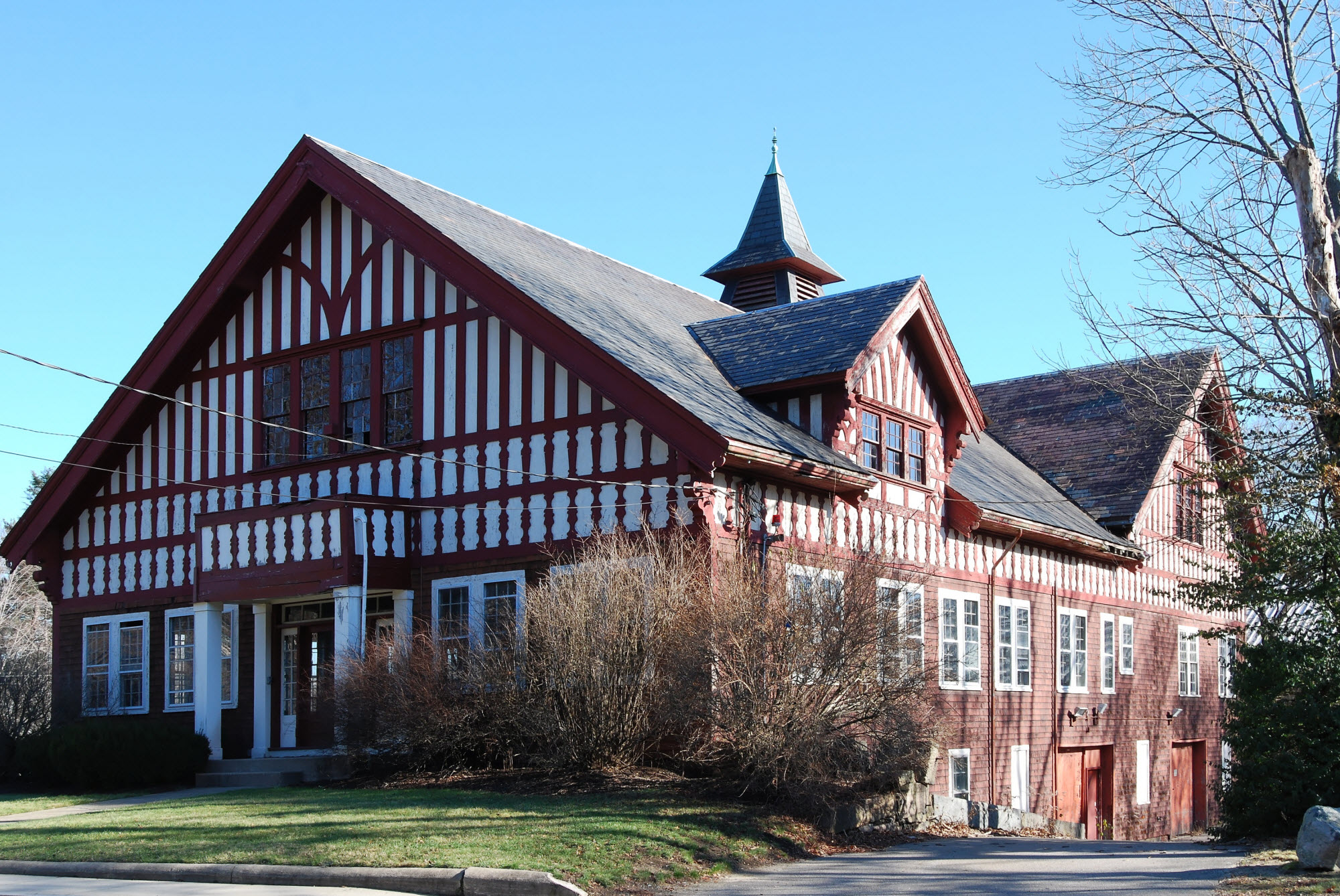
Ames office & stables (1897)

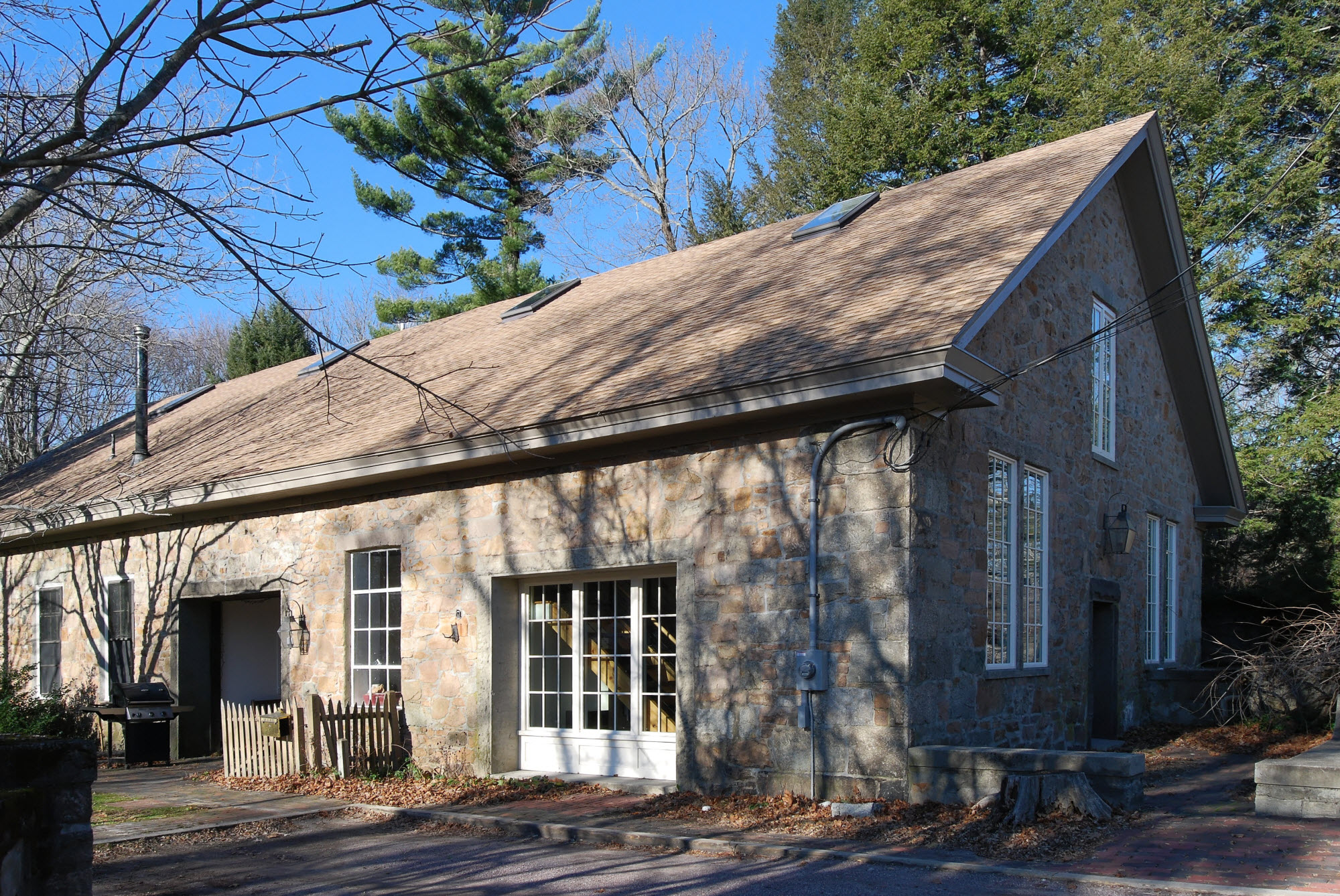
Antrim hammer shop

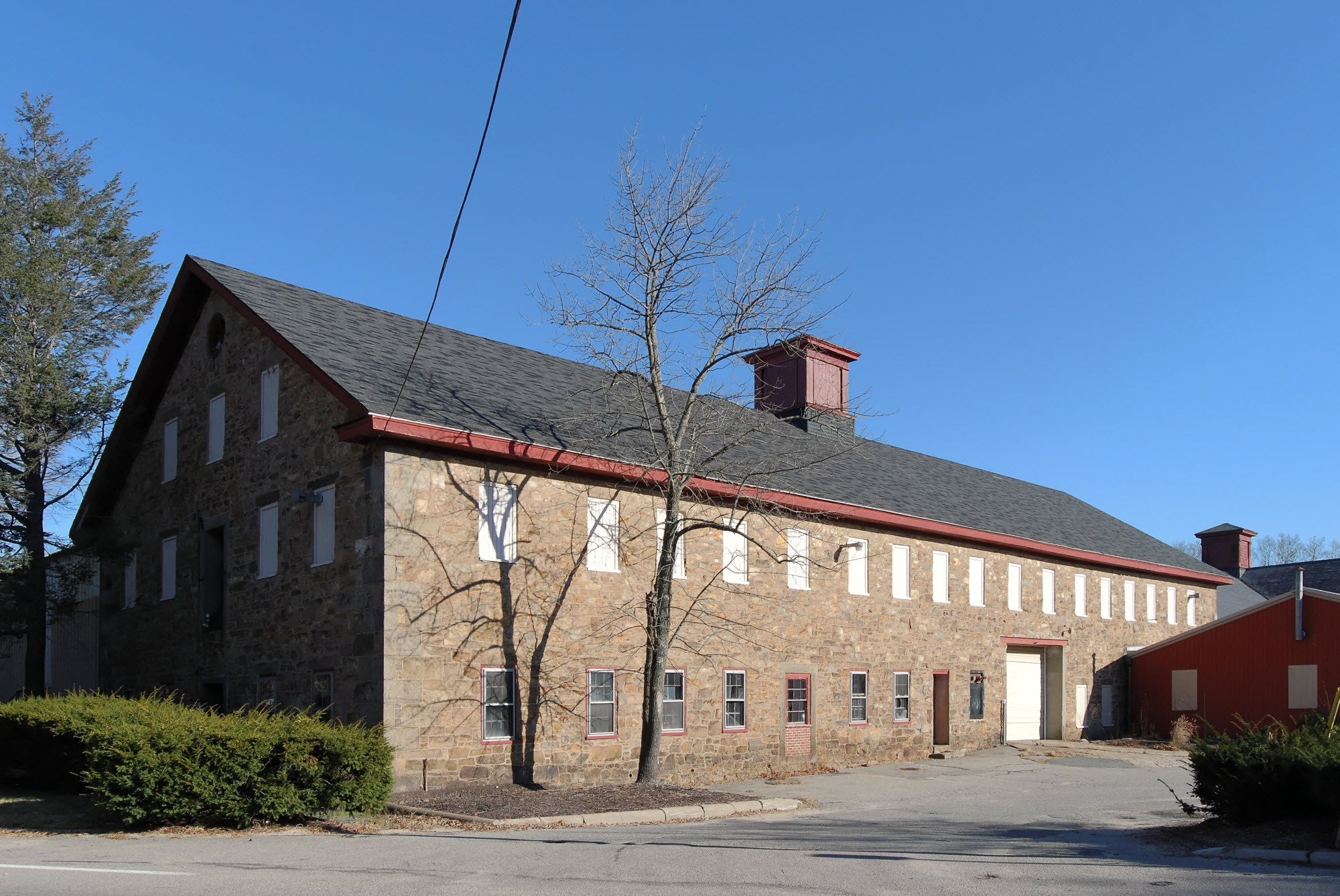
1857 machine shop

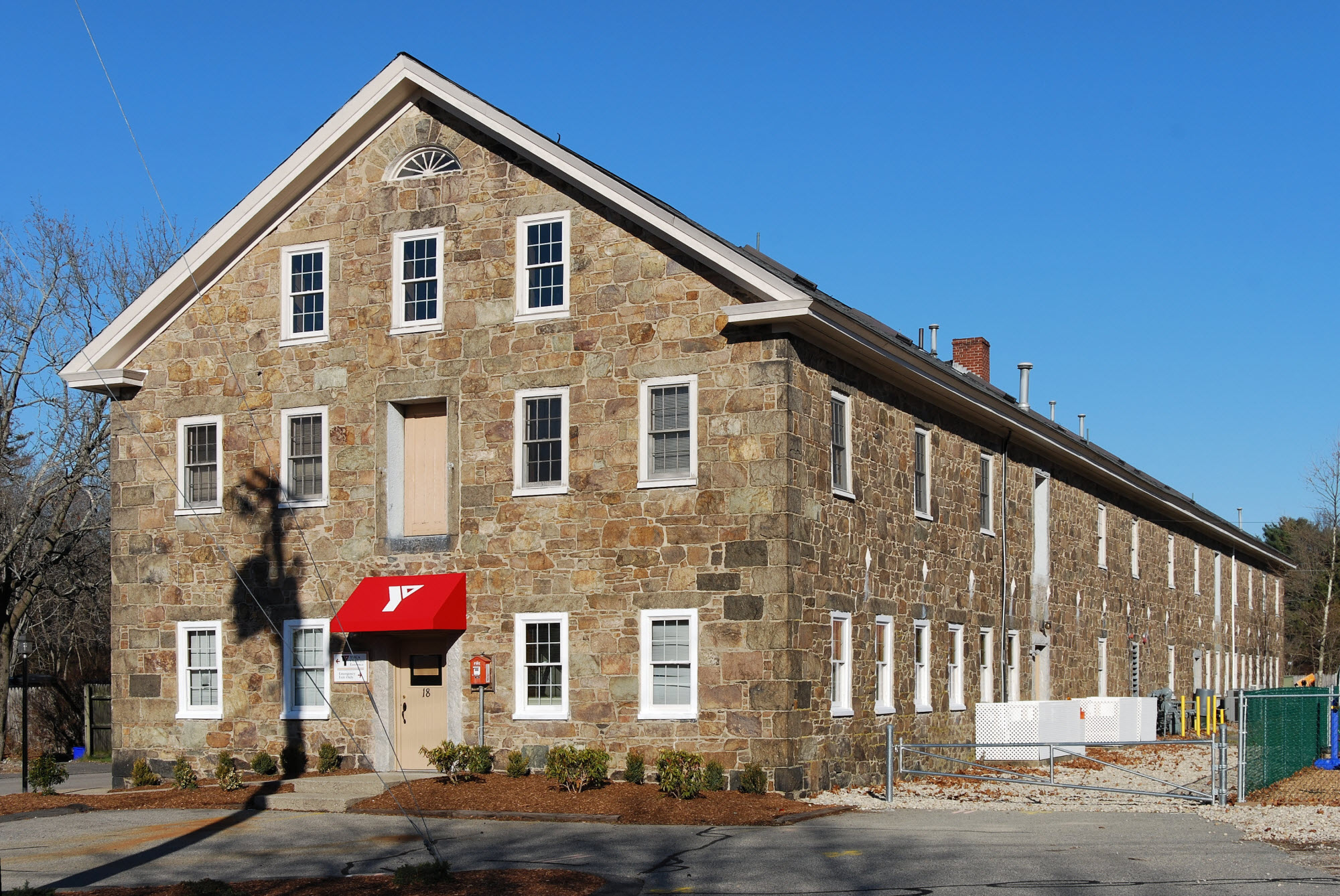
1870 handle shop

== Recent history ==
Since the 1950s the complex has been occupied by a variety of small businesses. The Ames brand is now part of the Ames True Temper Company, headquartered in Camp Hill, Pennsylvania

As of early 2009, the main shop complex was the subject of a redevelopment proposal that would significantly alter the site with the demolition of several historic structures and the construction of new residential buildings. In 2008, the site was designated as one of the most endangered historic places in the state by Preservation Massachusetts advocacy group.

The northernmost building, the 1870 handle shop is currently occupied by the local YMCA, and is not part of the redevelopment proposal. The abutting Richardson-designed Old Colony Railroad Station is currently occupied by the Easton Historical Society. The railroad station sits on a short remaining section of track that runs along the Shovel Shop property only. However, the abandoned rail corridor is currently under consideration for expansion of the MBTA commuter rail line from Stoughton to Fall River and New Bedford.

As of September 2014, the site has been redeveloped into apartment housing and is now renting apartments. It has undergone considerable redevelopment, while keeping the historic aspect of its buildings. Signs describing the various buildings and their history are in place. There are many walking paths in the area.

The historic North Easton station and former Dighton and Somerset Railroad right-of-way is proposed for Phase 2 of the South Coast Rail project, which would extend the MBTA Commuter Rail's Stoughton Branch to meet the Phase 1 route at East Taunton station, with through-running to New Bedford and Fall River by 2030.

== See also ==
- H. H. Richardson Historic District of North Easton
- National Register of Historic Places listings in Bristol County, Massachusetts
- Oakes Ames
- Oliver Ames Jr.
- Ames Monument
- Ames True Temper
- Frederick Lothrop Ames
- Frederick Lothrop Ames Jr.
