= Oakes Ames =

American businessman, investor, and politician (1804–1873)

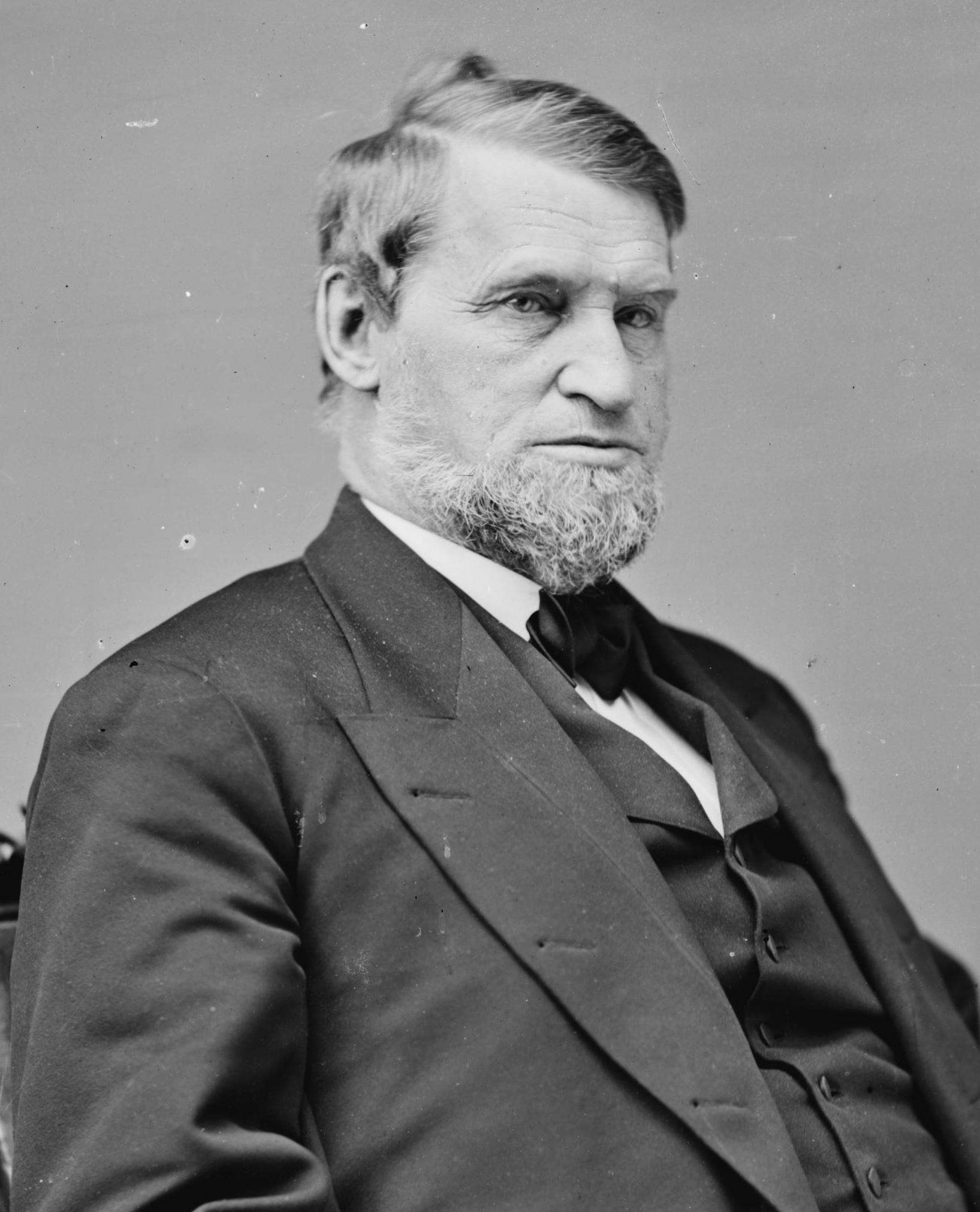
- Ames, 1860–1873

Member of the U.S. House of Representatives from Massachusetts's 2nd district
- In office March 4, 1863 – March 3, 1873
- Preceded by: James Buffington
- Succeeded by: Benjamin W. Harris

Personal details
- Born: January 10, 1804 Easton, Massachusetts, U.S.
- Died: May 8, 1873 (aged 69) Easton, Massachusetts, U.S.
- Party: Republican
- Spouse(s): Evelina Orville Ames, née Gilmore
- Children: Oakes Angier Ames; Oliver Ames
- Parents: Oliver Ames Sr.; Susanna Ames, née Angier
- Relatives: Ames family; Captain John Ames (paternal grandfather); Oliver Ames Jr. (brother); Oakes Ames (grandson); Winthrop Ames (grandson)
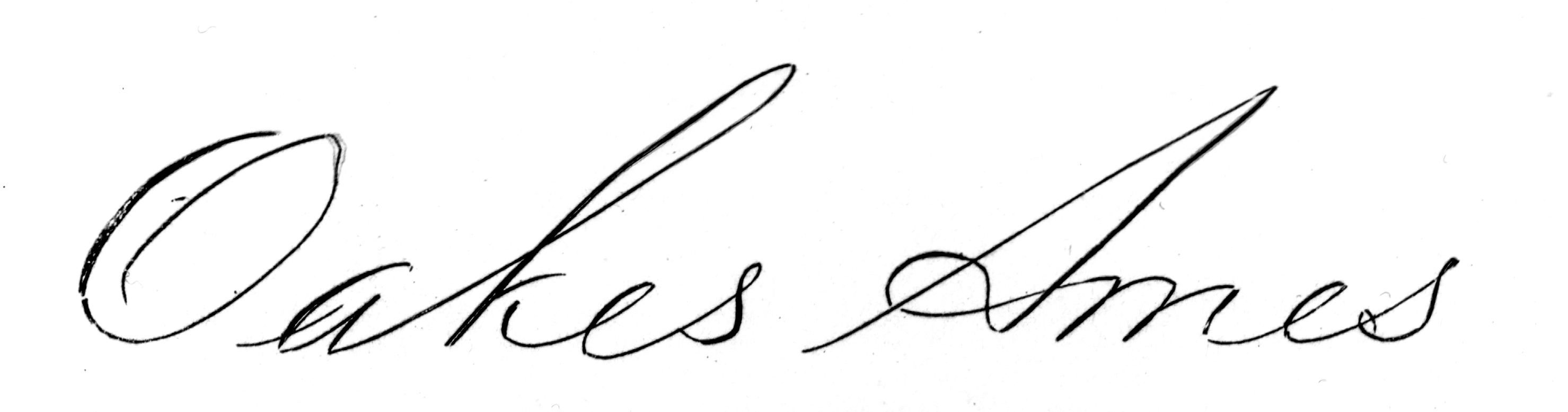
- Signature

Oakes Ames (January 10, 1804 – May 8, 1873) was an American businessman, investor, and politician. He was a member of the United States House of Representatives from Massachusetts. As a congressman, he is credited by many historians as being the single most important influence in the building of the Union Pacific portion of the transcontinental railroad. He is also noted for the subsequent scandal that alleged the improper sale of stock of the railroad's construction company.

== Biography ==
Ames was born in Easton, Massachusetts, the son of Susanna (Angier) Ames and Oliver Ames Sr., a blacksmith who had built a business of making shovels, the Ames Shovel Shop, and became nicknamed "King of Spades". In his youth, he obtained a public school education and later worked in the family workshops to learn each step of the manufacturing process. He eventually became a partner in the business, and with his brother Oliver Ames Jr. he established the firm Oliver Ames & Sons. Driven by the settlement of the Midwest, by the discovery of gold in California and Australia, as well as by railroad construction, the shovel manufacturing business boomed. During the Civil War, the firm prospered with contracts for swords, shovels, and other tools and implements. Ames made a large fortune.

He was influential in the establishment of the Republican Party in Massachusetts. In 1860, he became a member of the executive council of Massachusetts, and from 1863 to 1873 he served in Congress as a U.S. Representative for the Second District of Massachusetts. While there, he became a member of the Committee on Railroads during the early building of the transcontinental railroad. In 1865, President Abraham Lincoln appealed to him to take control of the Union Pacific (UP) portion of the project, which had become mired down because of the war, and had built only 12 miles (19 km) of track.

Through his influence he obtained contracts for his family firm in the construction of the Union Pacific and staked nearly all the family's holdings as capitalization for the project. The contracts were later transferred to the Credit Mobilier Company of America after Ames ousted its founder Thomas Durant. His brother Oliver was appointed president of the UP in 1866. The railroad was completed in 1869.

In 1872, it was disclosed Ames sold shares in Credit Mobilier to fellow congressmen at a price greatly below the market value of the stock. The subsequent public scandal led to a House investigation, which formally recommended expulsion. On February 28, 1873, the House passed a resolution formally censuring Ames "in seeking to secure congressional attention to the affairs of a corporation in which he was interested, and whose interest directly depended upon the legislation of Congress, by inducing members of Congress to invest in the stocks of said corporation." Detractors referred to him as "Hoax Ames". Ames died soon afterward at North Easton, Massachusetts, May 8, 1873, due to a stroke.

On May 10, 1883, the 14th anniversary of the completion of the railroad, the state legislature of Massachusetts passed a resolution exonerating Ames. His son Oliver Ames served as Governor from 1887 to 1890.

== Honors ==
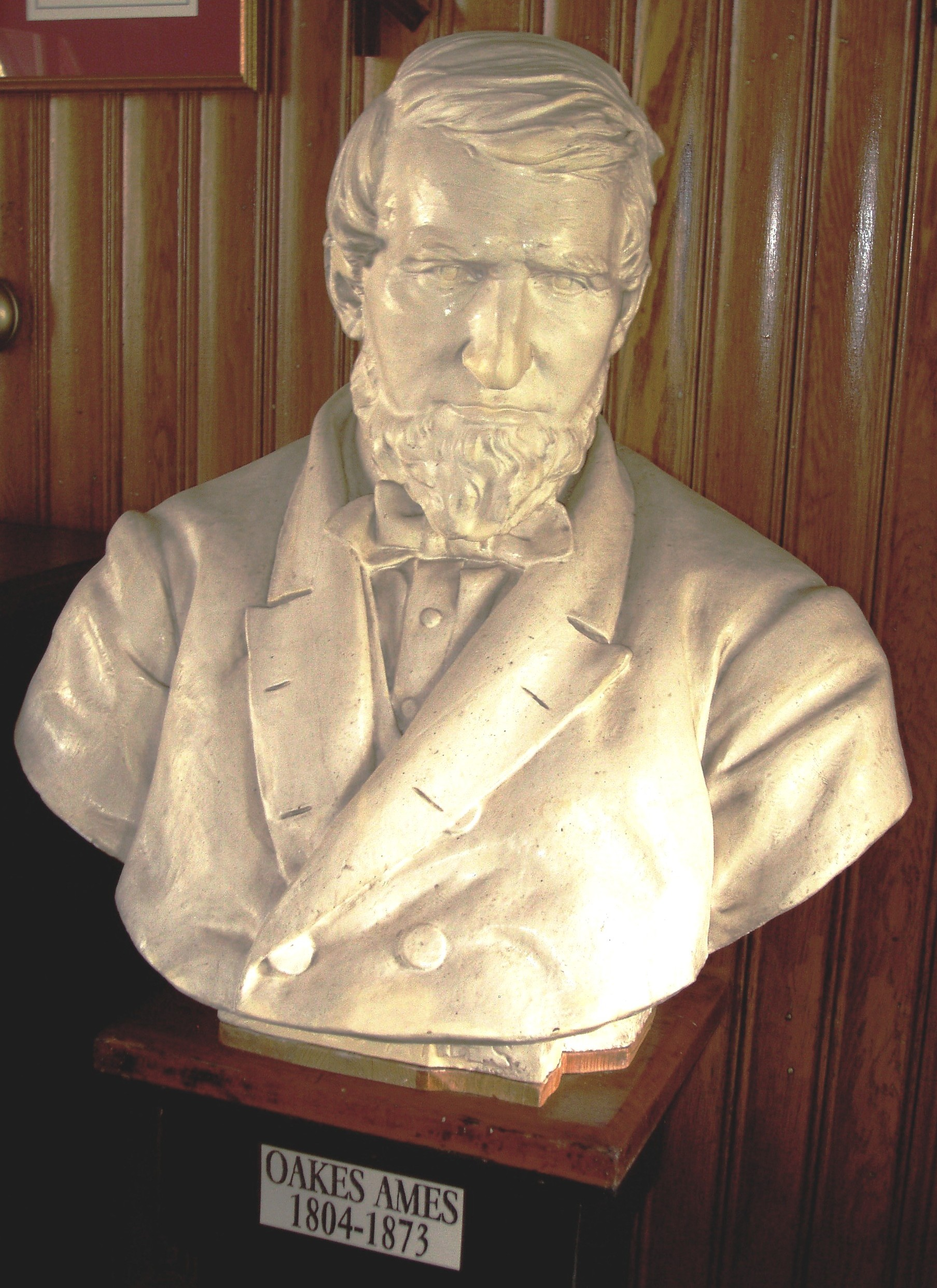
Oakes Ames

The contributions of Ames and his brother Oliver in the building of the Union Pacific are commemorated in the Oliver and Oakes Ames Monument at Sherman Summit, near Laramie, Wyoming, along the original route. The pyramidal monument was designed by famous architect Henry Hobson Richardson (who designed a number of projects for the Ames family) with sculpted plaques of the Ames brothers by Augustus Saint-Gaudens. At the time of its construction, the monument was located at the highest point attained by the UP's transcontinental route. With a change in the route of the railroad, the monument today is not on any major transportation route.

The city of Ames, Iowa is named for Oakes, as is likely the community of Ames, Nebraska, and Ames Avenue in Omaha.

== See also ==
- Oakes Ames Memorial Hall (Easton, Massachusetts)
- Ames Free Library (Easton, Massachusetts)
- Ames Shovel Shop
- Ames family
- List of United States representatives expelled, censured, or reprimanded
- List of federal political scandals in the United States

U.S. House of Representatives
Preceded by James Buffinton	Member of the U.S. House of Representatives from Massachusetts's 2nd congressional district 1863–1873	Succeeded by Benjamin W. Harris
