= Oliver Ames Jr. =

American railroad executive (1807–1877)

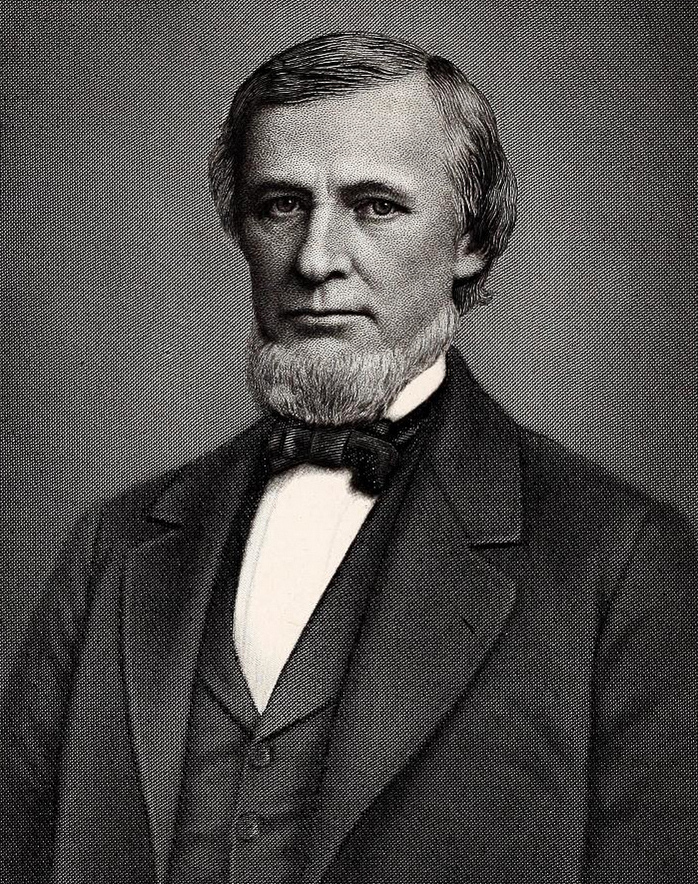
- Born: November 5, 1807; Plymouth, Massachusetts
- Died: March 9, 1877 (aged 69); North Easton, Massachusetts
- Occupations: Businessman, railroad executive
- Years active: 1844-1871
- Known for: Co-owner of Ames Shovel Shop; President of Union Pacific Railroad
- Spouse: Sarah Lothrop
- Children: Frederick Lothrop Ames; Helen Angier Ames
- Parents: Oliver Ames Sr.; Susannah Angier
- Relatives: Oakes Ames (brother); Governor Oliver Ames (nephew); Frederick Lothrop Ames Jr. (grandson); John Ames Mitchell (nephew)
- Honors: Oliver and Oakes Ames Monument, near Laramie, Wyoming; Ames Free Library

Signature
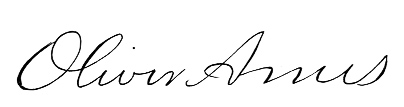

Oliver Ames Jr. (November 5, 1807 – March 9, 1877) was president of Union Pacific Railroad when the railroad met the Central Pacific Railroad in Utah for the completion of the First transcontinental railroad in North America.

== Biography ==
Born in Plymouth, Massachusetts, he was a son of Oliver Ames Sr. and Susannah (Angier) Ames, and a brother of Oakes Ames. Young Oliver attended public schools for a few years, then Franklin Academy in North Andover. He briefly entered the law field, but left to help in the family shovel business.

By 1844, Oliver and his brother Oakes Ames entered into partnership with their father, operating under the company name of Oliver Ames & Sons. It was a good time to be in the shovel business, as the nation was experiencing a dramatic expansion of canals, railroads, and other major infrastructure, all of which were built by men swinging shovels.

Oliver Ames Jr. served as president of Union Pacific Railroad (UP) while the railroad was busy building the First transcontinental railroad in North America. He was its president pro tem from 1866 until 1868, and was formally elected president of the company on March 12, 1868. He continued as president until March 8, 1871. His tenure was marked by controversy since his 1866 ascent to the presidency was over Thomas C. Durant who had tried to gain the position for himself. Durant filed lawsuits against Ames that stopped construction, and Ames retaliated by garnering support to remove Durant from the railroad's executive committee. A divided board of directors was beyond Ames' management capabilities, and he finally acquiesced to readmitting Durant in 1867, and Crédit Mobilier awarded Ames a new construction contract. In 1873, Ames succeeded his brother as the head of Crédit Mobilier.

Oliver Ames Jr. served in the Massachusetts State Senate in 1852 and 1857. He was a Whig and later a Republican.

=== Personal life ===
Starting around 1826, Oliver became involved in the temperance movement; he was said to be the first man in Easton to sign a temperance pledge.

Ames married Sarah Lothrop on June 11, 1833. Sarah was daughter of Howard Lothrop of Easton, Massachusetts. They had two children: Frederick Lothrop Ames and Helen Angier.

Like the rest of his family, Oliver Jr. was a devoted Unitarian, and attended Unitarian churches in Easton and North Easton. In 1875, Ames hired his nephew, John Ames Mitchell, to design the Unity Church of North Easton, at a cost of $100,000, (~$2.59 million in 2024) and on his death he left a bequest to keep the church in repair.

== Death and legacy ==
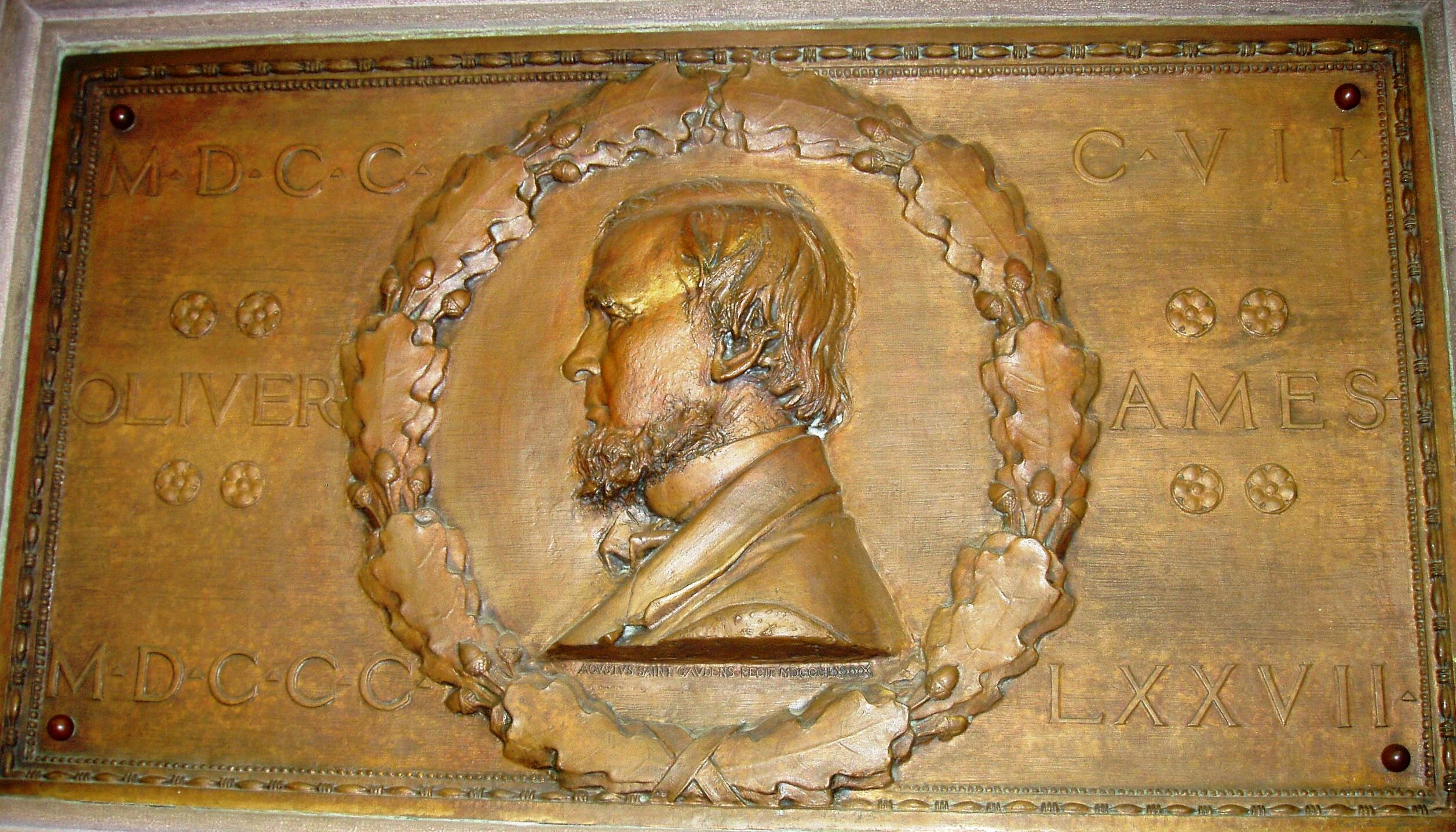
Bas relief by Augustus Saint-Gaudens

Ames died at North Easton on March 9, 1877. He left $50,000 in his will for the construction of a library. The will stipulated that it was to be a private institution, not owned by the town, but operated in trust for the public. The request was carried out by his children, Frederick Lothrop Ames and Helen Angier Ames. They hired Henry Hobson Richardson to design the Ames Free Library. The final cost of the building came to at least $80,000. Medallions in the library honor Ames with his likeness.

The contributions of Ames and his brother Oakes in the building of the Union Pacific are commemorated in the Oliver and Oakes Ames Monument at Sherman Summit, near Laramie, Wyoming, along the railroad's original route. The pyramidal monument was designed by famous architect Henry Hobson Richardson (who designed a number of projects for the Ames family) with sculpted plaques of the Ames brothers by Augustus Saint-Gaudens. At the time of its construction, the monument was located at the highest point attained by the Union Pacific's transcontinental route. With a change in the route of the railroad, the monument today is not on any major transportation route, though is easily accessible a short distance off an exit of Interstate 80.

== See also ==
- Ames Shovel Shop
- List of railroad executives
- North Easton Historic District
- Oliver Ames (nephew and Massachusetts Governor)
- Ames Free Library
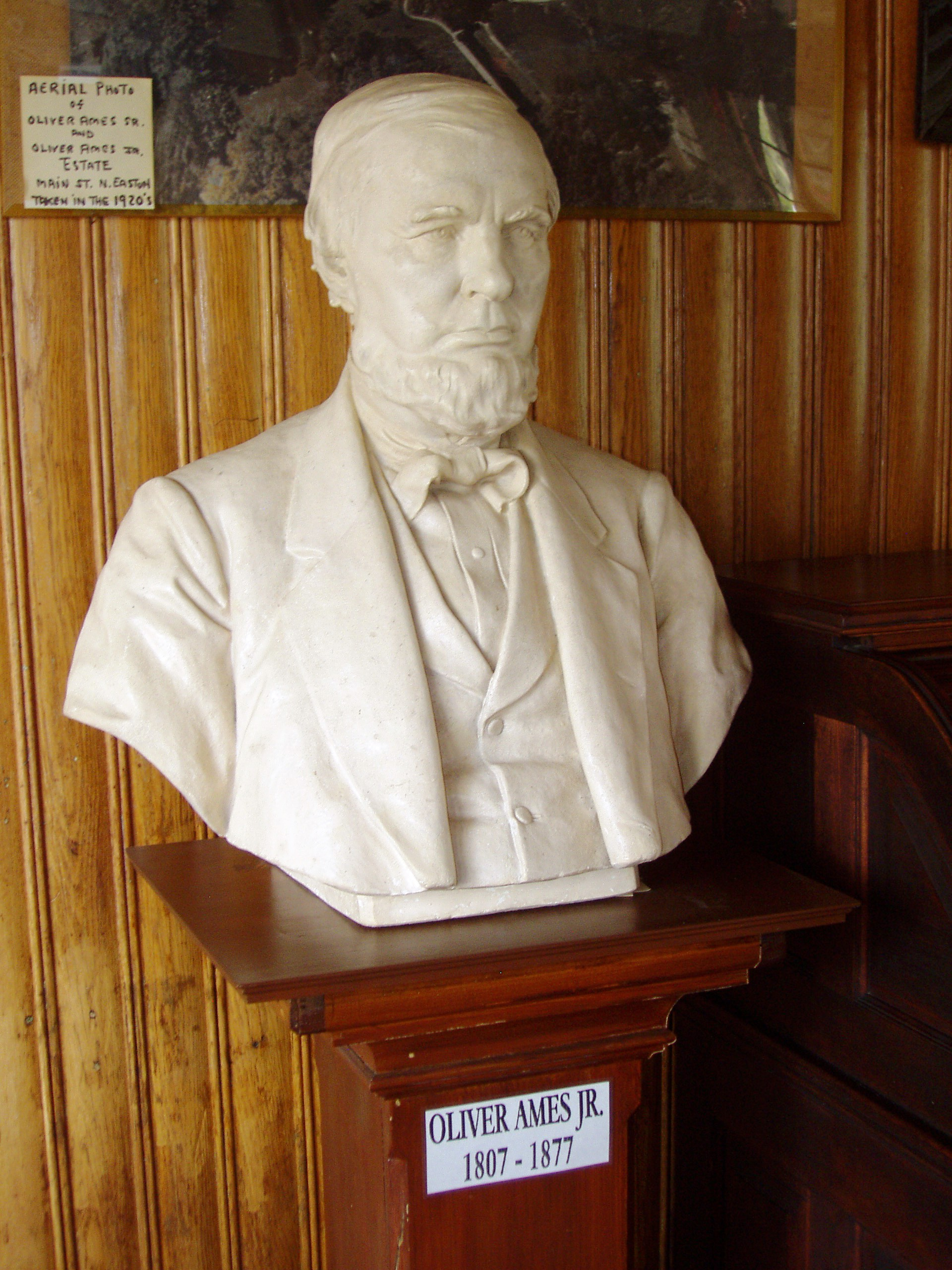
Oliver Ames Jr.

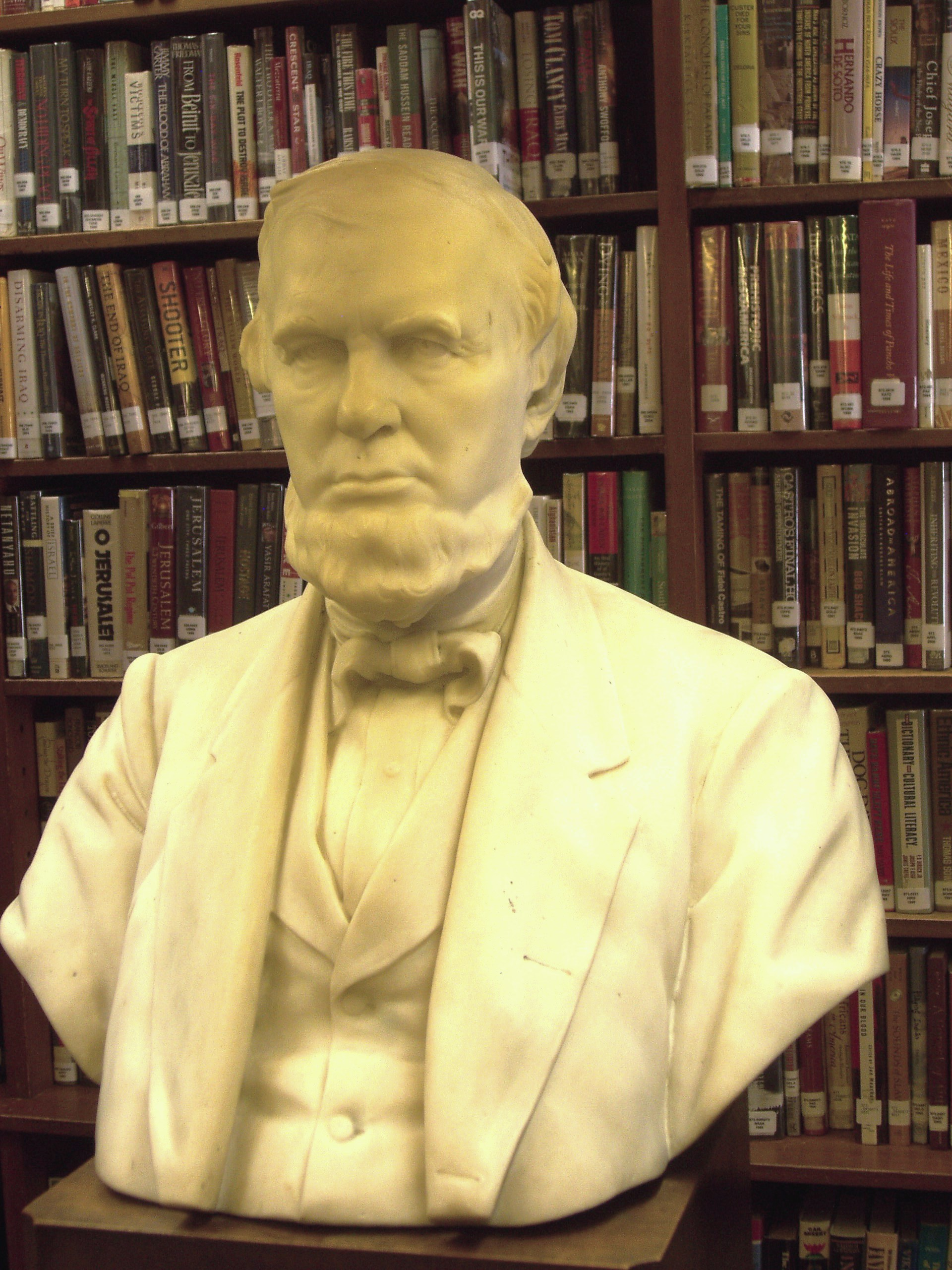
Oliver Ames Jr.

== Footnotes ==
Business positions
Preceded by John Adams Dix	President of Union Pacific Railroad; 1866 – 1871	Succeeded by Thomas Alexander Scott
