= Easton, Massachusetts =

- Town
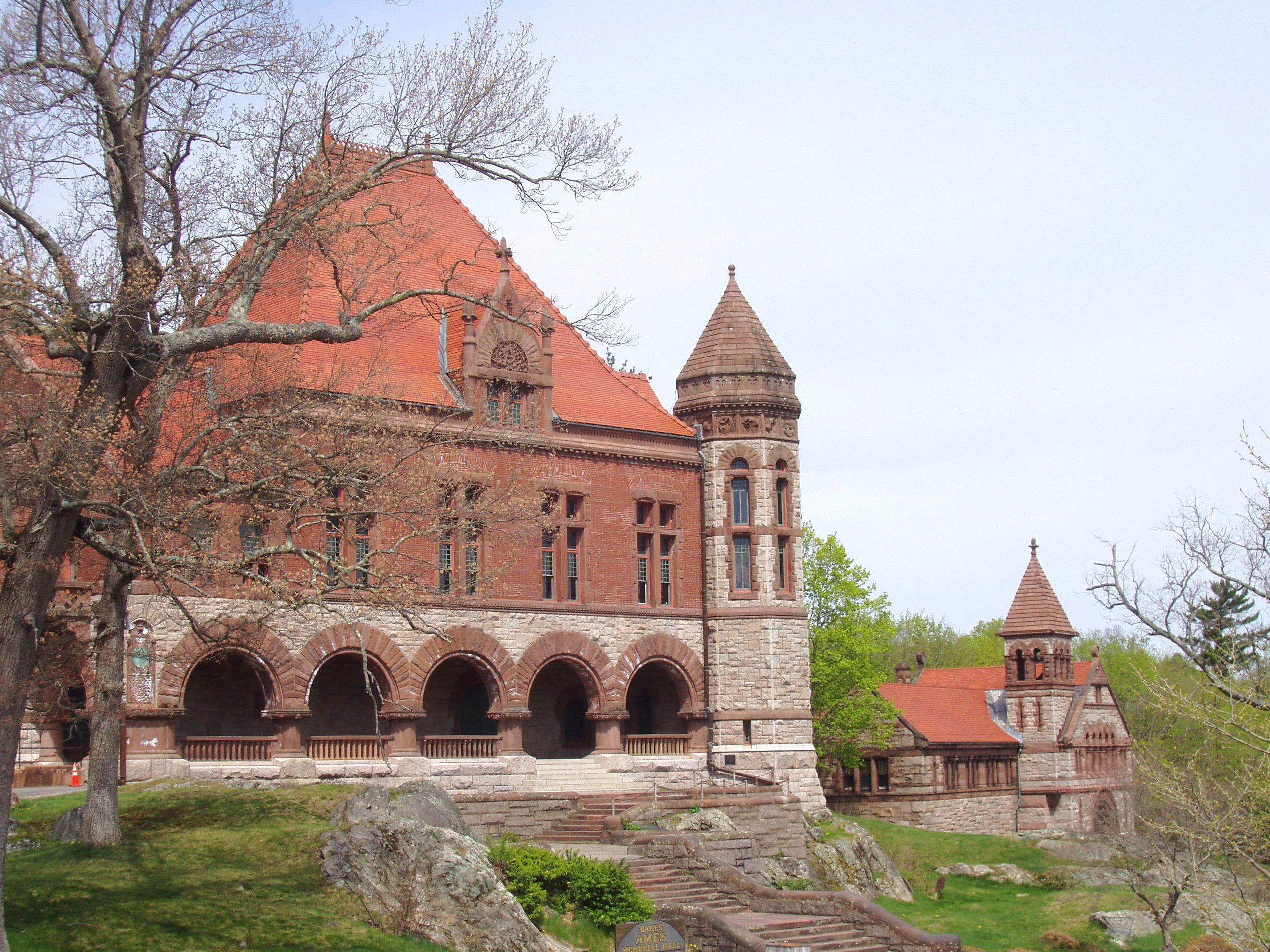
- Oakes Ames Memorial Hall with Ames Free Library in background.

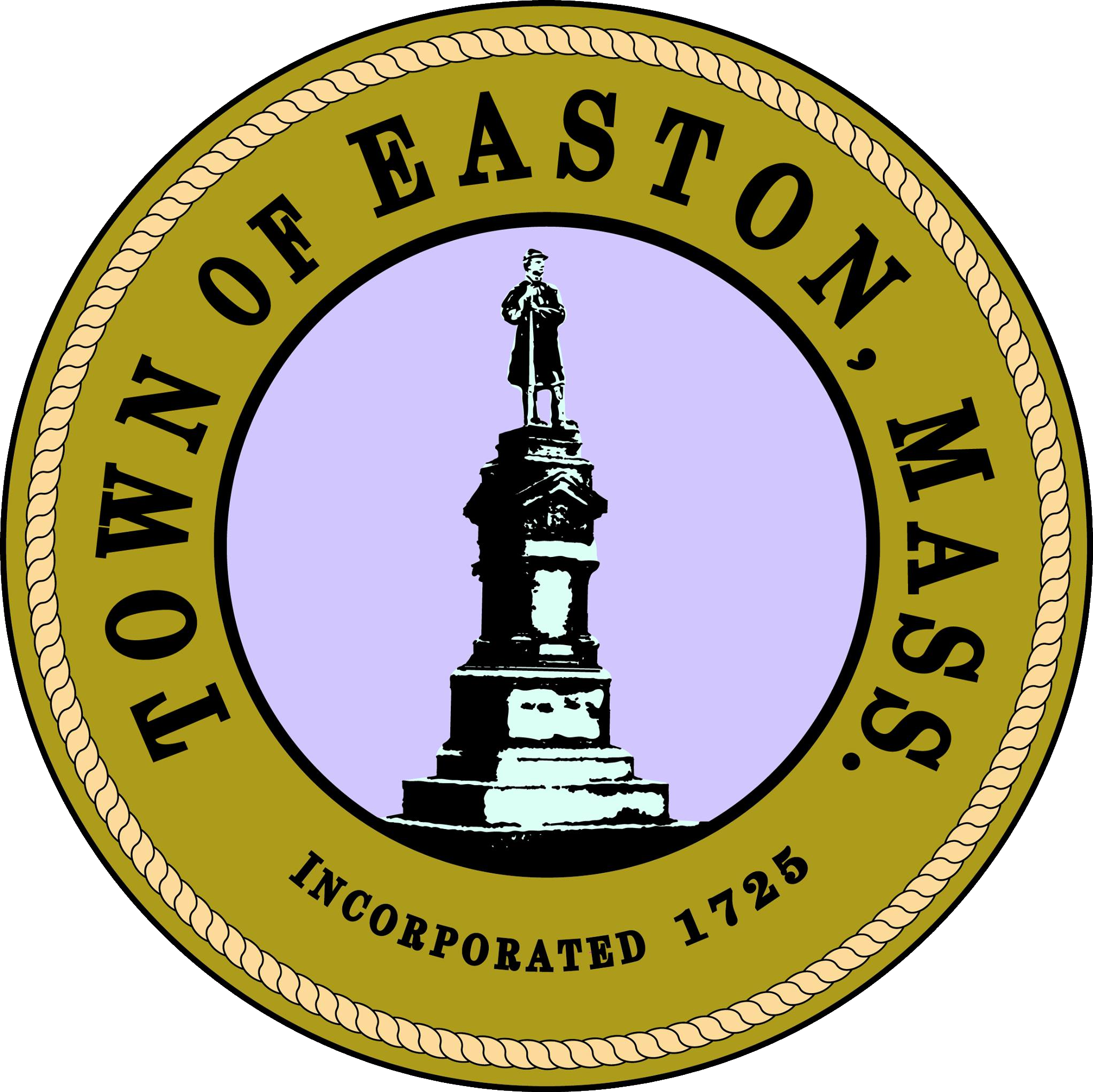
- Seal
- Nickname: Shoveltown
- Location in Bristol County in Massachusetts
- Coordinates: 42°01′28″N 71°07′45″W
- Country: United States
- State: Massachusetts
- County: Bristol
- Settled: 1694
- Incorporated: 1725

Government
  - Type: Open town meeting

Area
  - Total: 29.2 sq mi (75.5 km^{2})
  - Land: 28.5 sq mi (73.7 km^{2})
  - Water: 0.73 sq mi (1.9 km^{2})
- Elevation: 112 ft (34 m)

Population (2020)
  - Total: 25,058
  - Density: 880/sq mi (340/km^{2})
- Time zone: UTC−5 (Eastern)
  - Summer (DST): UTC−4 (Eastern)
- ZIP Codes: 02334 (P.O. boxes); 02356 (North Easton); 02357 (Stonehill College); 02375 (South Easton)
- Area code: 508/774
- FIPS code: 25-20100
- GNIS feature ID: 0619433
- Website: www.easton.ma.us

Easton is a town in Bristol County, Massachusetts, United States. The population was 25,058 at the 2020 census. It is part of the Greater Boston area.

Easton is governed by an elected Select Board. Open Town Meeting acts as the legislative branch of the town. The Select Board chooses a Town Administrator to run the day-to-day operations of the town.

== History ==
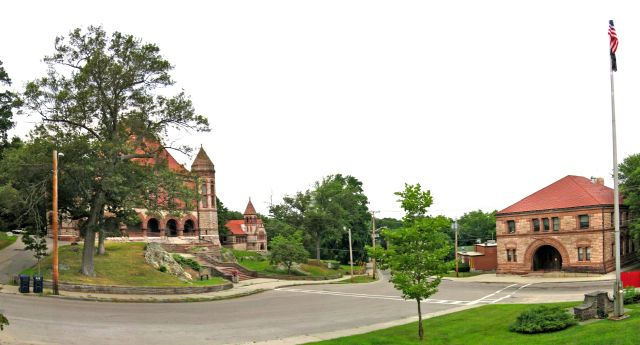
View from The Rockery showing Oakes Ames Memorial hall (left), Ames Free Library (center), and 66 Main Street (right)

Easton was first settled in 1694 and was officially incorporated in 1725.

In 1694, the first settler, Clement Briggs, established his home near the Easton Green. In 1711, the Taunton North Purchase area became Norton, and in 1713, the sixty-nine families settled in Easton and hired Elder William Pratt as their first minister. Prior to the settlers' establishment, the area was occupied by Native Americans as a hunting area and a burial ground. During King Philip's War, Metacom, also known as King Philip, used part of Easton as a headquarters for his troops. There was no legal parish in Easton until 1722, when the East Precinct of Norton was recognized. In 1725, the area was incorporated as the Town of Easton; it was so named because it was formerly called the "East End" of the Taunton North Purchase and was shortened by pronunciation to Easton. During the Revolutionary War, General George Washington stayed at the Benjamin Williams Tavern on Bay Road, which is now the second oldest existing house in Easton, while on his way to negotiate for cannonballs at the old Perry Foundry in Taunton.

In 1803, the Ames Shovel Works was established and became nationally known as having provided the shovels which laid the Union Pacific Railroad and opened the west. In 1875, the shovel production of the Ames plant was worth $1.5 million. The most notable of the Ames family were Oakes Ames, a key figure in the Crédit Mobilier of America scandal, and Oliver Ames (R), governor of Massachusetts from 1887 to 1890.

The Ames family shaped the town's economy, and was responsible for the presence of a number of landmark buildings in the town designed by H. H. Richardson, originator of the Richardsonian Romanesque style and designer of Trinity Church in Boston.

Richardson buildings in Easton include:

- The Ames Free Library (town library)
- Oakes Ames Memorial Hall
- The Old Colony Railroad Station (houses the Easton Historical Society)
- The Ames Gate Lodge (privately owned by the Ames family)
- The F. L. Ames Gardener's Cottage (privately owned by the Ames family)

Though this school complex was not made by Richardson himself, it was dedicated to him and made in his style:

- H. H. Richardson/F. L. Olmsted Intermediate School

In addition, there is a commercial building at 69 Main Street which was designed and built in the nineteenth century by Richardson's office in a Richardsonian style. The Richardson buildings are all located within a compact area designated as the H. H. Richardson Historic District. The area also includes The Rockery, designed by Frederick Law Olmsted, who also landscaped grounds of Oakes Ames Memorial Hall and the Ames Free Library.

Within a few blocks of the H. H. Richardson Historic District is Unity Church, built by the Ames family in 1875, and designed in the Gothic Revival Style by architect and publisher John Ames Mitchell. It includes an ornate oak frieze including sculptures of twenty-two angels playing music, carved by Wyatt Hopeboth (1860–1930), and two notable stained-glass windows, "Angel of Help," and "Figure of Wisdom," both by John LaFarge (1835–1910). "Figure of Wisdom," completed in 1901, is the largest stained-glass work created by LaFarge.

== Geography ==
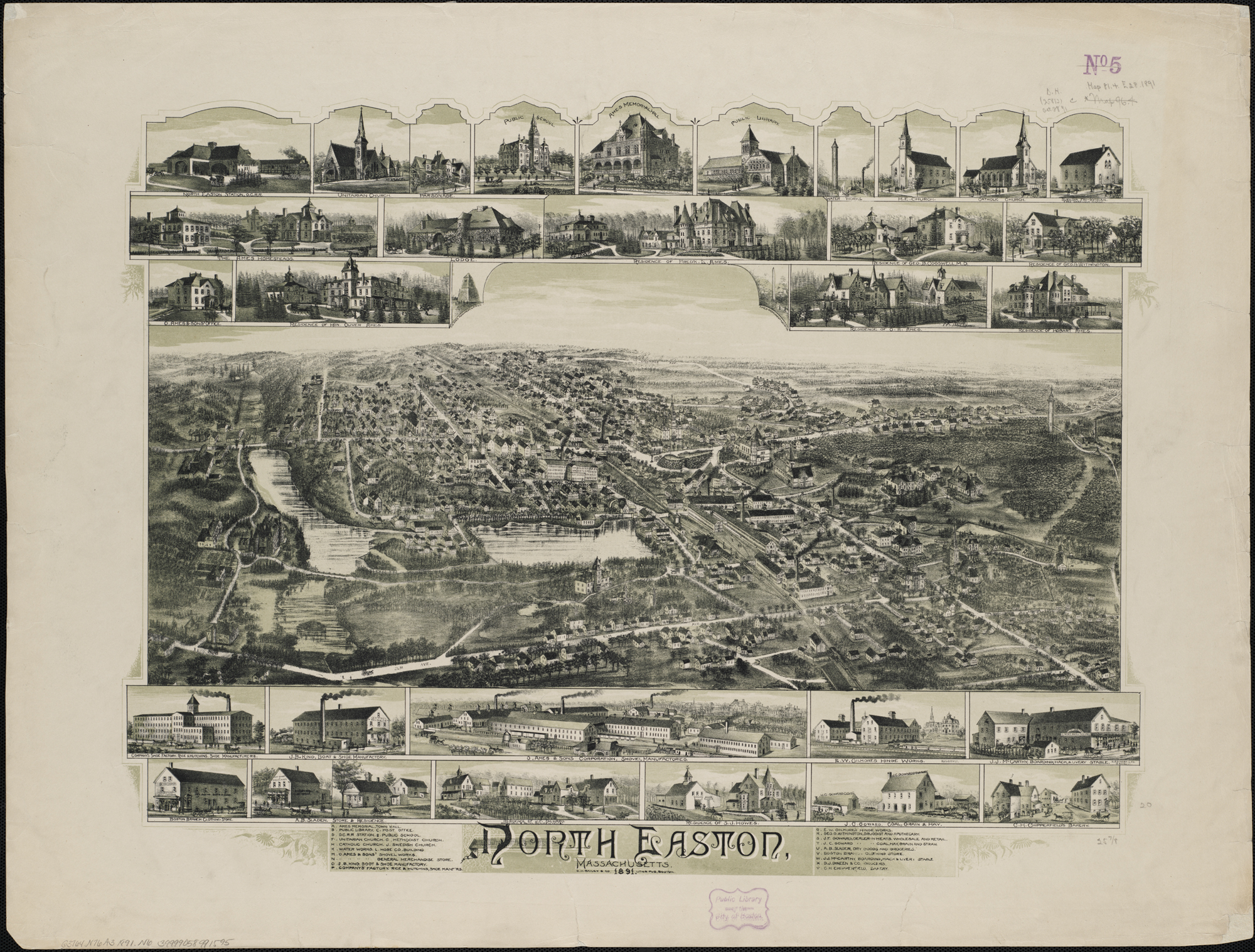
North Easton in 1891

According to the United States Census Bureau, the town has a total area of 29.2 square miles (76 km^{2}), of which 28.4 square miles (74 km^{2}) is land and 0.7 square miles (1.8 km^{2}) (2.54%) is water. The town, in addition to its own smaller town forest, includes part of Borderland State Park at the northwestern corner of town, Hockomock Swamp Wildlife Management Area at the southeastern corner of town, and all of Wheaton Farm Conservation Area in the southwest. All of the town's waterways are considered part of the Taunton River Watershed area, which in turn is the eastern section of the Narragansett Bay Watershed area.

Easton forms the northeastern corner of Bristol County, where the county intersects with Plymouth County to the east and Norfolk County to the north.

The localities of Easton include Alger's Corner, Daley Corner, Easton Center, Easton Green, Eastondale, Five Corners, Furnace Village, Goward's Corner, Morris Corner, Morse Corner, Pratt's Corner. Although there is no official designation dividing "North Easton" from "South Easton," the terms are colloquially used by older residents of the town even though they have no governmental or legal standing.

Easton is located in eastern Massachusetts. The roughly trapezoidal-shaped town is bordered by Brockton and West Bridgewater to the east, Taunton and Raynham to the south, Norton to either side of its southwest corner, Mansfield to the west, and Sharon and Stoughton to the north.

== Demographics ==
Historical population
Year	Pop.	±%
1790	1,466	—
1850	2,337	+59.4%
1860	3,067	+31.2%
1870	3,668	+19.6%
1880	3,902	+6.4%
1890	4,493	+15.1%
1900	4,837	+7.7%
1910	5,139	+6.2%
1920	5,041	−1.9%
1930	5,298	+5.1%
1940	5,135	−3.1%
1950	6,244	+21.6%
1960	9,078	+45.4%
1970	12,157	+33.9%
1980	16,623	+36.7%
1990	19,807	+19.2%
2000	22,299	+12.6%
2010	23,112	+3.6%
2020	25,058	+8.4%
2024*	25,568	+2.0%
* = population estimate. Source: United States census records and Population Estimates Program data.

As of the census of 2000, there were 22,299 people, 7,489 households, and 5,571 families residing in the town. The population density was 784.1 inhabitants per square mile (302.7/km^{2}). There were 7,631 housing units at an average density of 268.3 per square mile (103.6/km^{2}). The racial makeup of the town was 91.94% White, 1.59% African American, 0.04% Native American, 1.39% Asian, 0.01% Pacific Islander, 4.13% from other races, and 0.91% from two or more races. Hispanic or Latino of any race were 1.58% of the population.

There were 7,489 households, out of which 37.4% had children under the age of 18 living with them, 62.3% were married couples living together, 8.9% had a female householder with no husband present, and 25.6% were non-families. Of all households, 20.7% were made up of individuals, and 6.9% had someone living alone who was 65 years of age or older. The average household size was 2.74 and the average family size was 3.21.

In the town, the population was spread out, with 24.4% under the age of 18, 13.1% from 18 to 24, 28.7% from 25 to 44, 24.3% from 45 to 64, and 9.4% who were 65 years of age or older. The median age was 36 years. For every 100 females, there were 94.6 males. For every 100 females age 18 and over, there were 91.1 males.

The median income for a household in the town was $89,144, and the median income for a family was $112,190. Males had a median income of $51,429 versus $35,912 for females. The per capita income for the town was $40,732. About 0.7% of families and 2.0% of the population were below the poverty line, including 0.6% of those under age 18 and 6.5% of those age 65 or over.

== Education ==
=== Public schools ===
Easton's public school system includes one early-elementary school serving kindergarten through second grade: Blanche A. Ames Elementary School; there are two elementary schools serving grades 3–5: Frederick Law Olmsted School and Henry Hobson Richardson School (now considered one school, known as "Richardson-Olmsted."); meanwhile grades 6 through 8 attend Easton Middle School, and high school students attend Oliver Ames High School (OA).

Oliver Ames High School's athletic teams' mascot is the tiger. The school colors are orange and black. The OA girls varsity basketball team won the Division II state basketball championship in 2006 and 2010. The Oliver Ames Varsity Baseball team won the Division II State Baseball Championship in June 2007. In November 2007, Oliver Ames girls' varsity soccer team won the Division II state soccer championship. In 2015, 2022, 2023 and 2024 the Oliver Ames boys soccer team won the state championship game. The high school also boasts an impressive music department, complete with a jazz band, marching band, concert band, show choir, concert choir and chamber orchestra. The Oliver Ames Marching Band won the 2008 Division 2 New England championships for USSBA, and placed fifth out of 29 bands competing.

The town is also home to Southeastern Regional Vocational Technical High School, which serves all the bordering towns (except Taunton and Raynham), plus Foxborough. Students may choose to attend Southeastern or Oliver Ames free of charge.

=== Higher education ===
Easton is home to Stonehill College, a private, non-profit, coeducational, Roman Catholic, liberal arts college. Their mascot is "Ace" the Skyhawk.

== Transportation ==
Easton is served by the following highways that run through the town: Routes 106, 123 and 138. Additionally, the town is served by two major highways which run just outside its border, Route 24 to the east and Interstate 495 to the south.

Easton receives limited bus service from the Brockton Area Transit Authority, with Route 9 making stops adjacent to Stonehill College and the Easton Industrial Park. Bloom Bus Lines also offers commuter bus service to Taunton and Boston, with a flag stop at the corner of Route 138 and Route 106.

Easton is the site of two proposed MBTA Commuter Rail stations, North Easton and Easton Village, on the Stoughton Branch option of the MBTA's South Coast Rail project. In March 2011, following the release of the U.S. Army Corps of Engineers' Draft Environmental Impact Report, Gov. Deval Patrick's administration and the MBTA announced this alternative as the best option for achieving all the goals of the project. As of 2019, the Easton stations have been moved to Phase 2 of the project, which will not be completed until 2030.

== Points of interest ==
- Ames Free Library
- Borderland State Park
- Governor Oliver Ames Estate
- Oakes Ames Memorial Hall
- Stonehill College
- The Rockery

== Notable people ==
=== Athletes ===
- Austin Causey, soccer player
- Jim Craig, goaltender for the gold medal-winning 1980 "Miracle on Ice" U.S. Olympic hockey team
- Corey Dillon, former NFL player; lived in Easton while playing for the New England Patriots
- Irving Fryar, lived in Easton while playing for the Patriots
- Scott Gordon, former US Olympic and NHL hockey goalie, AHL and NHL coach
- Nick Green, lived in Easton while playing for the Boston Red Sox
- Russ Hochstein, lived in Easton while playing for the Patriots
- Cedric Green, lived in Easton while playing as a wide receiver for the Patriots
- Ronnie Lippett, former Patriots player who still lives in Easton
- David MacKinnon, former MLB First Baseman who spent time with the Los Angeles Angels and Oakland Athletics
- John Marino, NHL defenseman for the New Jersey Devils
- Stanley Morgan, former Patriots player; lived in Easton
- Andre Tippett, lived in Easton for a part of his career while playing for the Patriots
- Mo Vaughn, former Red Sox first baseman; lived in Easton
- Erik Vendt, three-time Olympic Medalist for swimming (two silver, one gold) in the 2000, 2004 and 2008 Olympics
- Mike Vrabel, former NFL linebacker lived in Easton while playing for the Patriots
- Brent Williams, former Patriots player; lives in Easton

=== Historical ===
- Blanche Ames Ames (1878–1969), Inventor/painter, suffragette, and first president of the Birth Control League of Massachusetts. Maiden name was Ames, married Oakes Ames (below) and kept both names, although no relation until married
- Oakes Ames (1804–1873), manufacturer, United States Congressman
- Oakes Ames (1874–1950), specialist in orchids
- Oliver Ames Sr. (1779–1863), patriarch of Ames family
- Oliver Ames Jr. (1807–1877), president of the Union Pacific railroad
- Frederick Lothrop Ames (1835–1893), Vice President of the Old Colony Railroad and director of the Union Pacific railroad
- Frederick Lothrop Ames Jr. (1876–1939), Son of Frederick Lothrop Ames
- Ruth Graves Wakefield, Creator of the chocolate chip cookie
- Winthrop Ames (1870–1937), theater director, producer, playwright and screenwriter.

=== Writers ===
- Joseph Nassise, author

=== Politicians ===
- Oliver Ames (1831–1895), governor of Massachusetts
- Claire Cronin, 25th United States Ambassador to Ireland, and former Majority Leader of the Massachusetts House of Representatives
- George Van Ness Lothrop (1817–1897), Michigan Attorney General
- Martin V. Pratt (1828–1898), Wisconsin State Assemblyman

=== Actors ===
- Kristian Alfonso, soap opera star

== Government ==
Easton is represented by Gerald Cassidy (D) and Carol Doherty (D) in the Massachusetts House of Representatives.

Easton is represented by Walter Timilty (D).

Easton is represented by Elizabeth Warren (D) and Ed Markey (D) in the United States Senate.

In the United States Congress Easton is represented by Jake Auchincloss (D).

=== Local government ===
Easton is governed by an elected committee of select board members and a town administrator. Easton's "Board of Selectmen" was renamed a Select Board via Town Meeting in 2019.

The Easton Select Board as of September 2019:

- Dottie Fulginiti (chair)
- Craig Barger (Vice-chair)
- Marc Lamb
- Jennifer Stacy
- Jamie Stebbins

The Easton Town Administrator as of September 2019:

- Connor Read

Easton presidential election results
Year	Democratic	Republican	Third parties	Total Votes	Margin
2020	60.02% 8,715	37.65% 5,467	2.32% 337	14,519	22.37%
2016	52.16% 6,556	41.62% 5,231	6.21% 781	12,568	10.54%
2012	45.73% 5,262	52.66% 6,060	1.61% 185	11,507	6.93%
2008	50.96% 6,111	47.26% 5,667	1.78% 213	11,991	3.70%
2004	51.34% 5,878	47.48% 5,436	1.19% 136	11,450	3.86%
2000	53.16% 5,675	41.02% 4,379	5.82% 621	10,675	12.14%
1996	52.60% 5,060	37.18% 3,576	10.22% 983	9,619	15.43%
1992	36.35% 3,736	38.00% 3,906	25.65% 2,637	10,279	1.65%
1988	38.20% 3,550	60.60% 5,632	1.19% 111	9,293	22.40%
1984	34.43% 2,730	65.42% 5,188	0.15% 12	7,930	31.00%
1980	28.80% 2,148	53.73% 4,008	17.47% 1,303	7,459	24.94%
1976	46.09% 3,189	51.12% 3,537	2.79% 193	6,919	5.03%
1972	41.26% 2,316	58.28% 3,271	0.46% 26	5,613	17.01%
1968	44.26% 2,178	52.69% 2,593	3.05% 150	4,921	8.43%
1964	59.57% 2,680	40.21% 1,809	0.22% 10	4,499	19.36%
1960	39.66% 1,766	60.09% 2,676	0.25% 11	4,453	20.44%
1956	20.95% 821	78.90% 3,092	0.15% 6	3,919	57.95%
1952	23.68% 813	76.20% 2,616	0.12% 4	3,433	52.52%
1948	30.27% 848	68.90% 1,930	0.82% 23	2,801	38.63%
1944	27.17% 727	72.65% 1,944	0.19% 5	2,676	45.48%
1940	26.66% 765	72.95% 2,093	0.38% 11	2,869	46.29%

== Media ==
Easton does not have a daily newspaper, but is served by The Enterprise of Brockton, a GateHouse Media company. Easton's last town-specific newspaper, a weekly called the Easton Journal, published its final issue in 2019, combining with three other local weekly newspapers to create a regional weekly called the Journal News Independent (also owned by GateHouse Media).

Easton Community Access Television serves as the public access station for the town, with many town board meetings and school events televised on the channel. Because of Easton's proximity to both Boston and Providence, town residents have access to television networks in both media markets.

== Religion ==
Easton has 13 houses of worship, including two Baptist churches, two Catholic churches, two Congregational churches, and two Jewish temples.
