= William Dorsheimer House =

Historic house in New York, United States

- U.S. National Register of Historic Places
- U.S. Historic district – Contributing property
- New York State Register of Historic Places
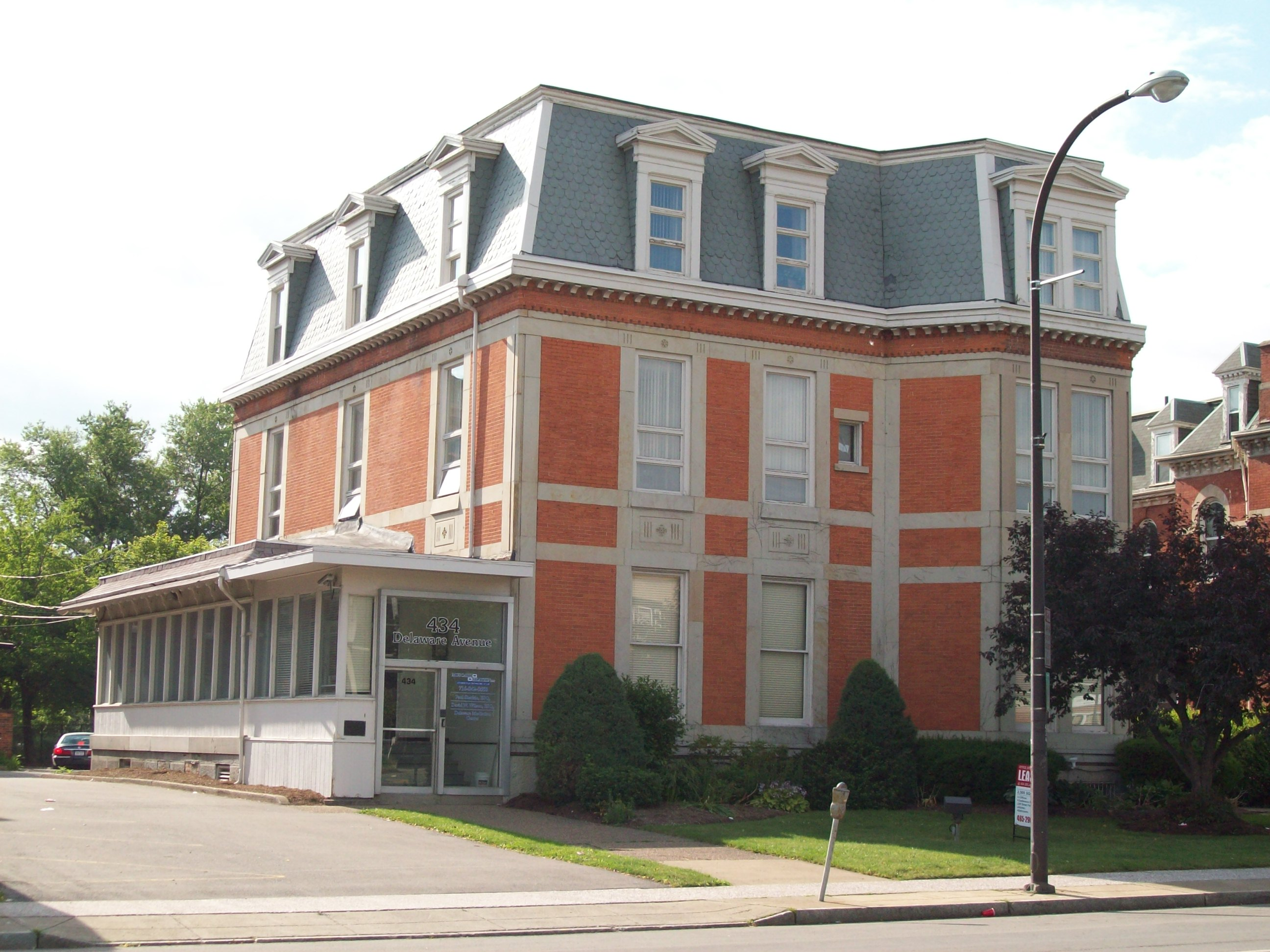
- William Dorsheimer House, June 2009

- Location within New York Location within the United States
- Location: 434 Delaware Ave., Buffalo, New York
- Coordinates: 42°53′46″N 78°52′31″W
- Area: 0.3 acres (0.12 ha)
- Built: 1868
- Architects: Richardson, Henry Hobson
- Architectural style: Renaissance, Neo Greek
- Part of: Allentown Historic District (ID80002605)
- NRHP reference No.: 80002607
- NYSRHP No.: 02940.000718

Significant dates
- Added to NRHP: November 21, 1980
- Designated NYSRHP: September 30, 1980

William Dorsheimer House is a historic home located at Buffalo in Erie County, New York, that was listed on the National Register of Historic Places in 1980.

== History ==
It was designed and built in 1868 by Henry Hobson Richardson (1838–1886) for William Dorsheimer (1832–1888), prominent local lawyer and Lieutenant Governor of New York. It is a 2 1/2-story brick dwelling and represents the profound influence of French ideas on the arts in the post Civil War period.

=== Design ===
The three-story building is of a relatively simple design featuring incised decorations of rosettes and triglyphs. The house features horizontal bands of gray sandstone across the ochre brick facade and vertical stone at the buildings corners. The windows on the structure are framed by vertical bands of the same gray sandstone and are in perpendicular rows. The mansard roof is made of slate and features large dormers.

It was listed on the National Register of Historic Places in 1980.

=== H. H. Richardson ===
The Dorsheimer home was the first Richardson building in Buffalo and proved to be a significant commission in Richardson's career as it led to some of Richardson's greatest achievements. In 1877, while Dorsheimer was Lieutenant Governor of New York, Richardson was commissioned, along with Frederick Law Olmsted and Leopold Eidlitz, to complete the New York State Capitol and later, Albany City Hall.

Also in Buffalo, Richardson designed the Buffalo State Hospital (in 1870), and the William Gratwick House (1886–1888). The Gratwick House was a few blocks north of the Dorsheimer House, at the corner of Delaware and Summer, but was torn down in 1919.

== Today ==
The interior has been completely remodeled to allow for commercial use and one main, open-well stairway remains. The stairway extends from the first floor (north entrance) to the third floor. The staircase appears to have been moved to the north to allow for additional space in the rooms to the south.

== Gallery ==
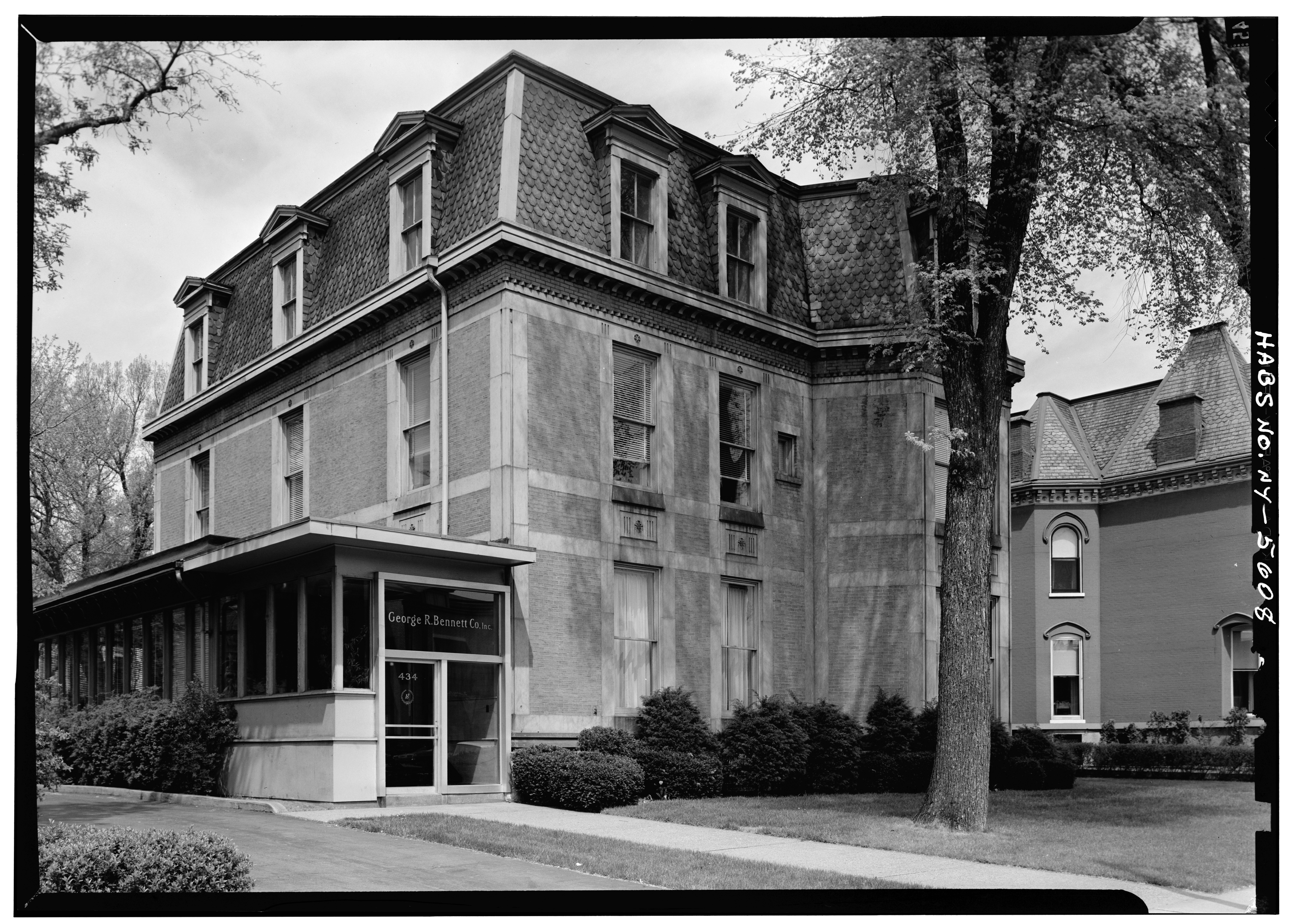
Southeast elevation (May 1965)

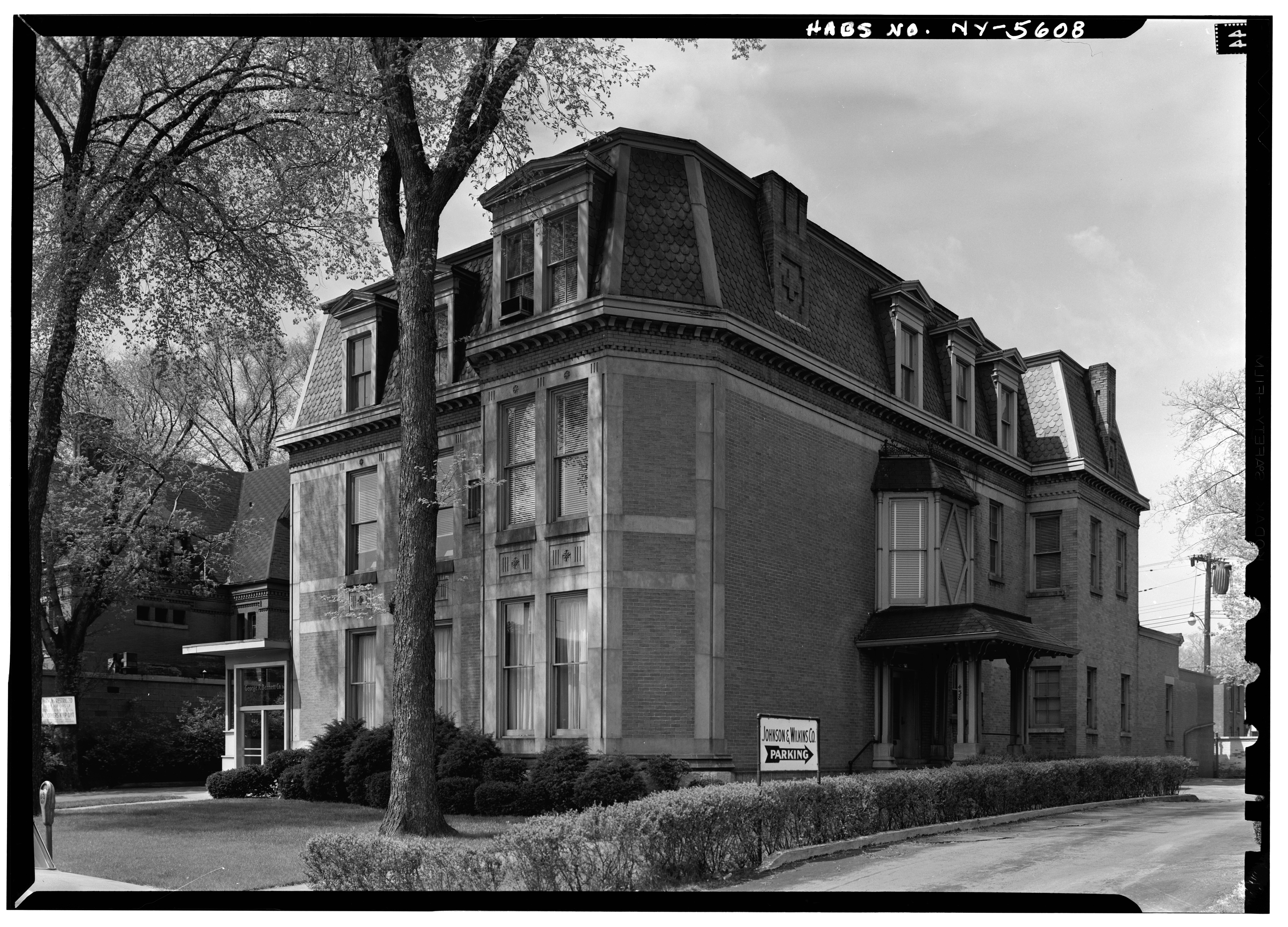
Northeast elevation (May 1965)

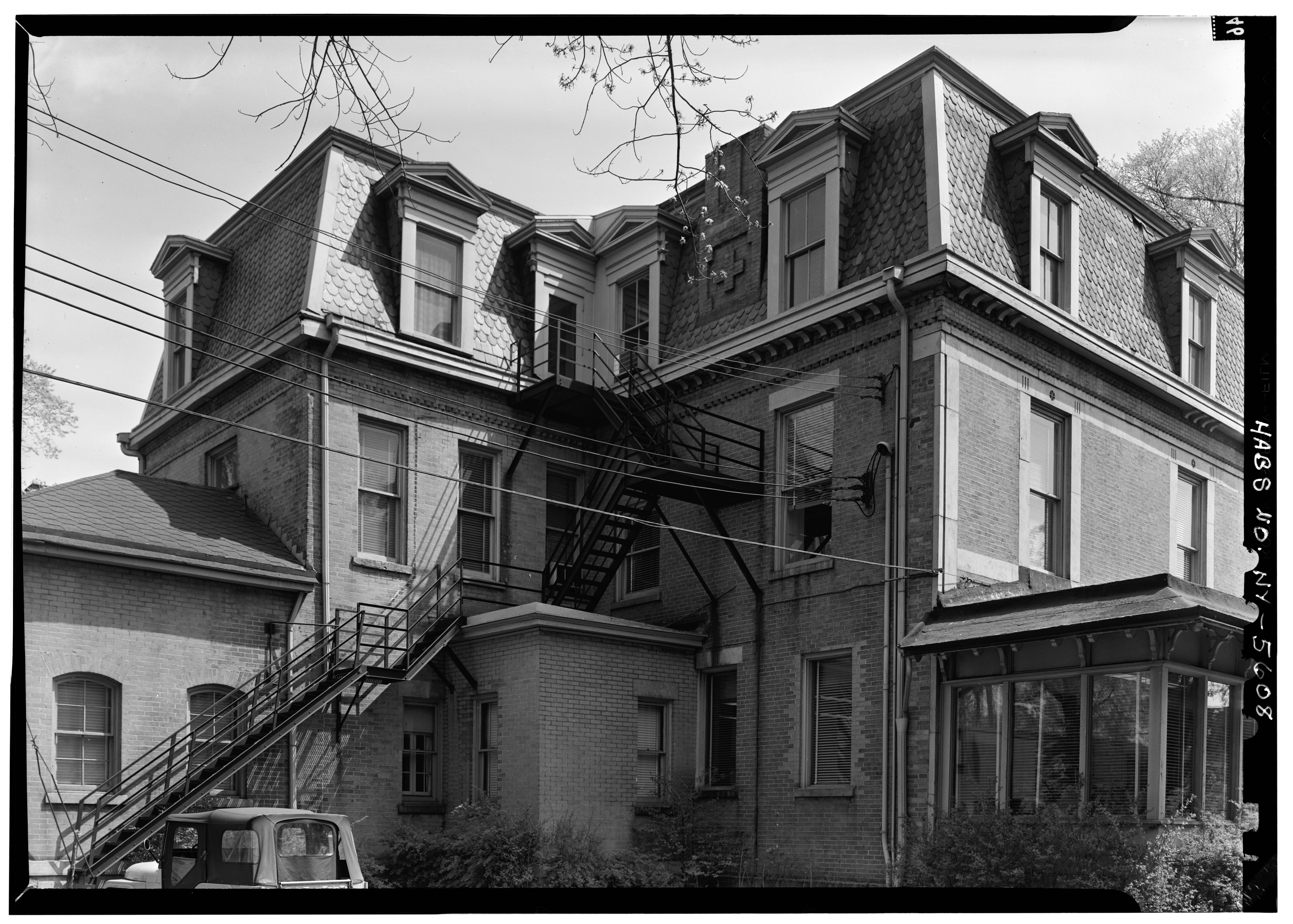
West elevation (May 1965)

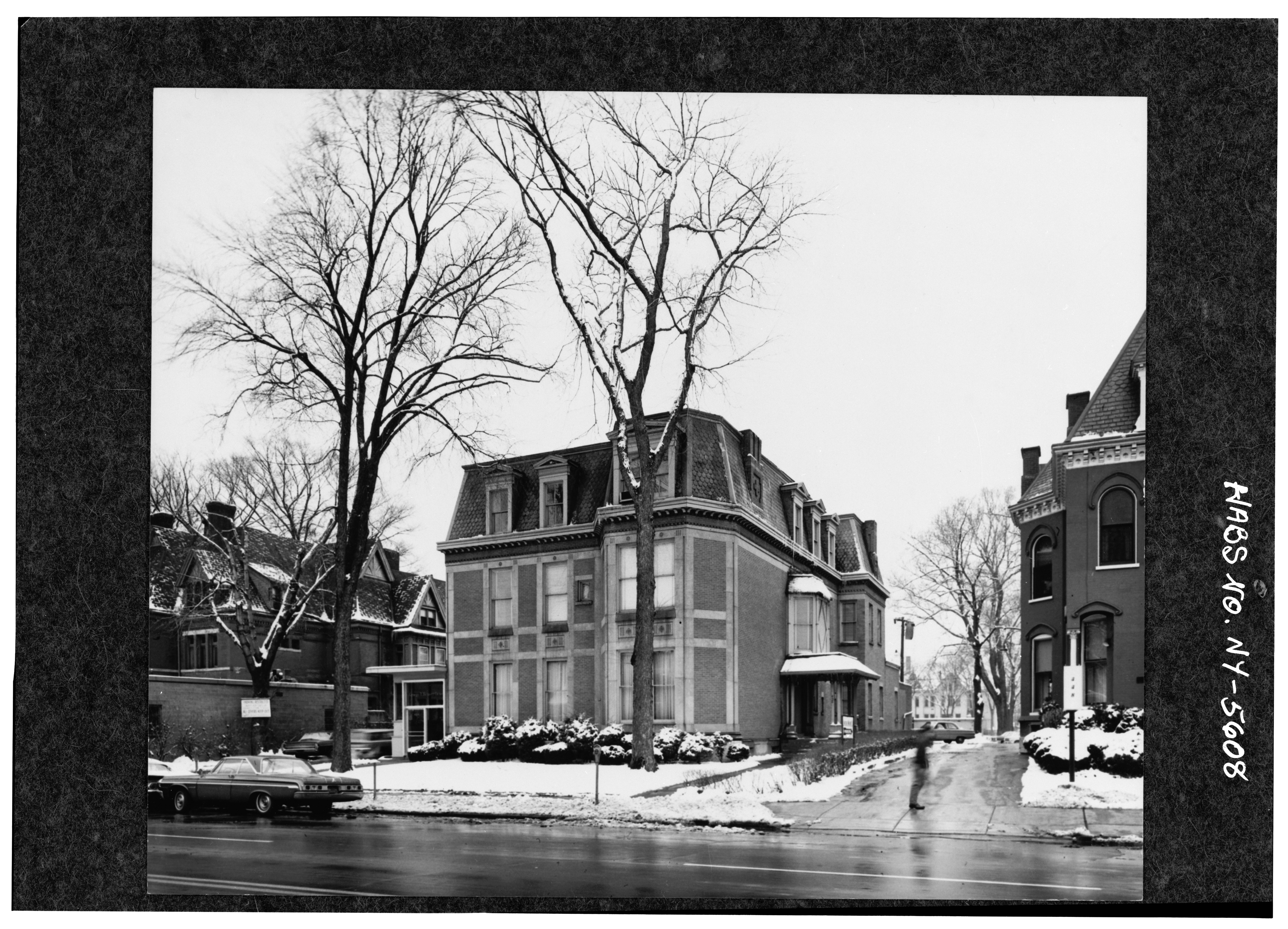
View from Delaware Avenue

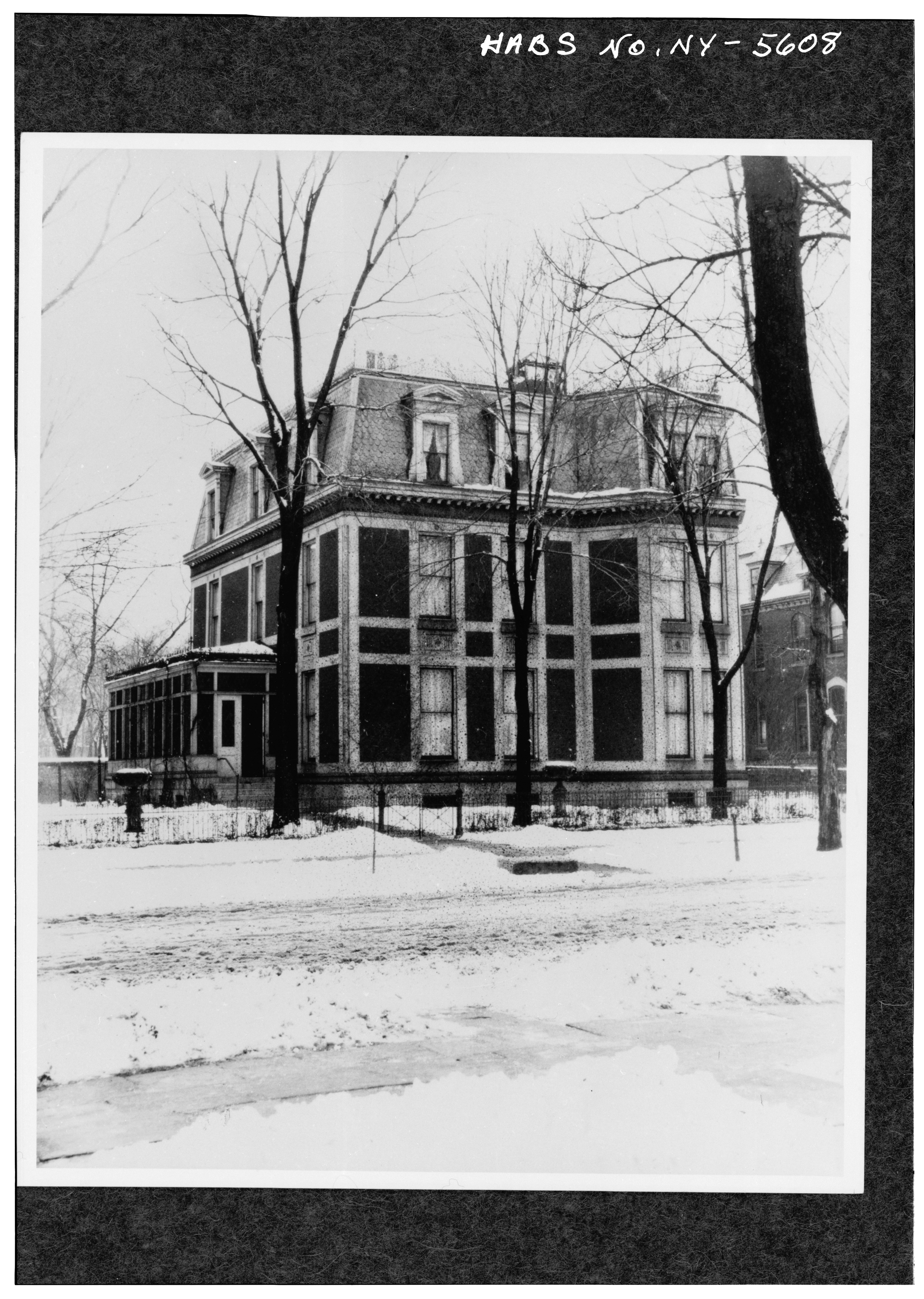
East facade in winter

== See also ==
- Architecture of Buffalo, New York
- William Dorsheimer
- Henry Hobson Richardson
