= Richardson Olmsted Complex =

Buildings in Buffalo, New York

Richardson Olmsted Campus
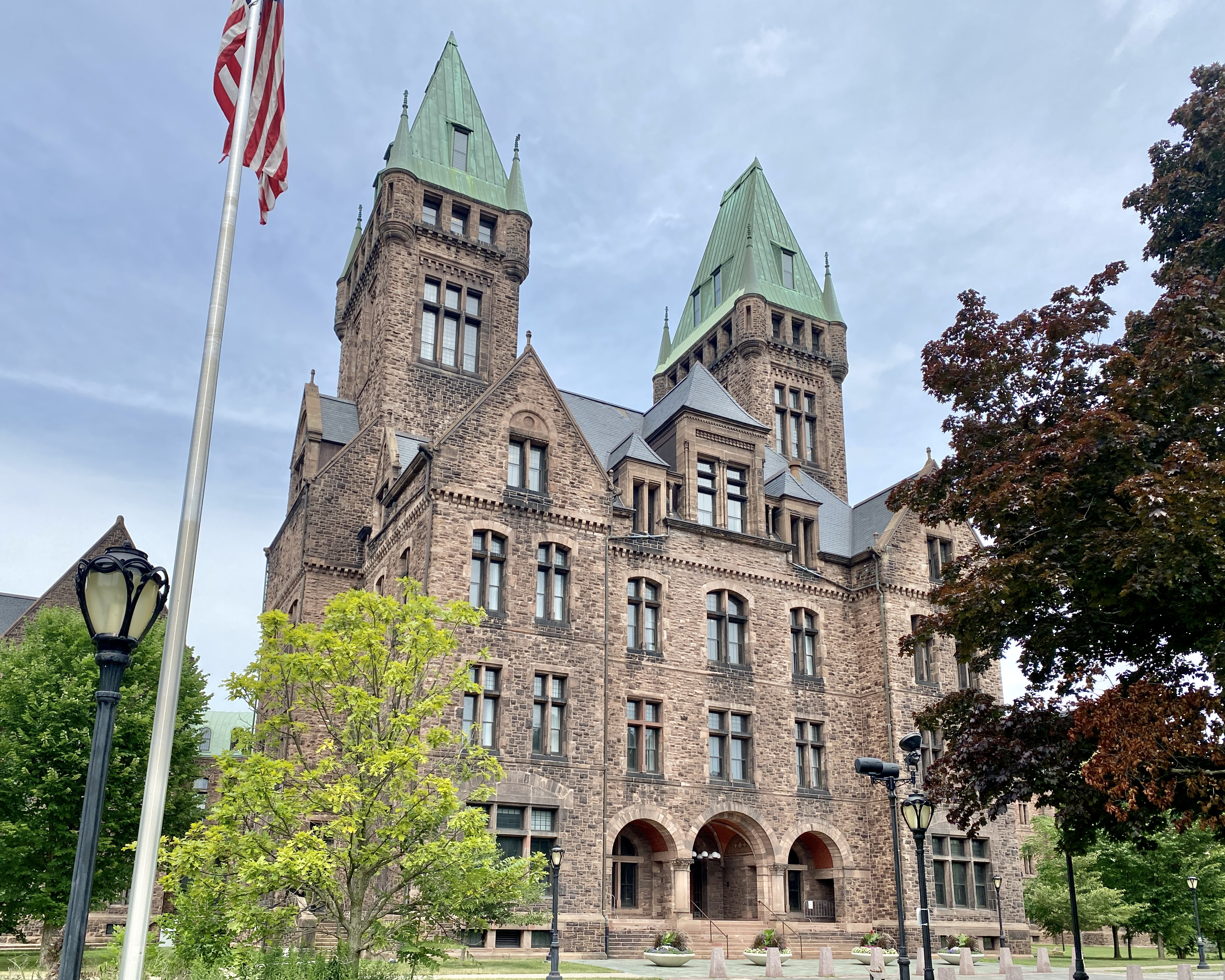
- Former names: Buffalo State Asylum for the Insane; Buffalo State Hospital; Richardson Olmsted Complex; Hotel Henry
- Alternative names: The Richardson Hotel

General information
- Status: Used as a hotel
- Location: 444 Forest Avenue, Buffalo, New York 14222
- Coordinates: 42°55′43″N 078°52′55.1″W
- Named for: Henry Hobson Richardson
- Buffalo State Asylum for the Insane (State Lunatic Asylum)
- U.S. National Register of Historic Places
- U.S. National Historic Landmark
- New York State Register of Historic Places
- Area: 93 acres (38 ha)
- Built: Cornerstone placed in 1872. Finished in 1895.
- Architect: Henry Hobson Richardson
- Architectural style: Richardsonian Romanesque
- NRHP reference No.: 86003557 (Note: Originally listed in 1973 with reference number 73001186, under the name "Buffalo State Hospital".)

Significant dates
- Added to NRHP: January 12, 1973
- Designated NHL: June 24, 1986
- Designated NYSRHP: June 23, 1980
- Renovated: 2006–2023

Other information
- Number of rooms: 88

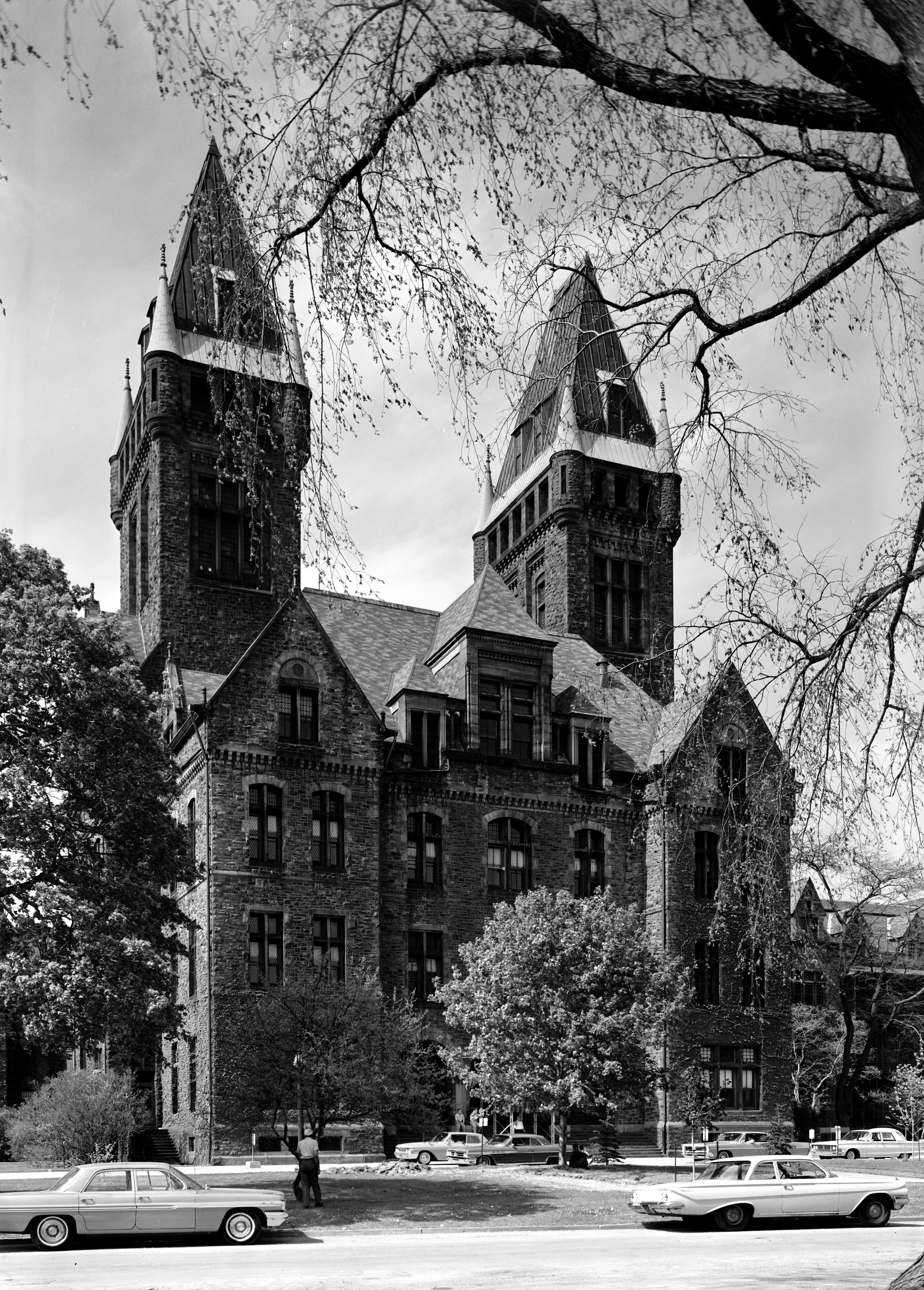
South elevation, 1965

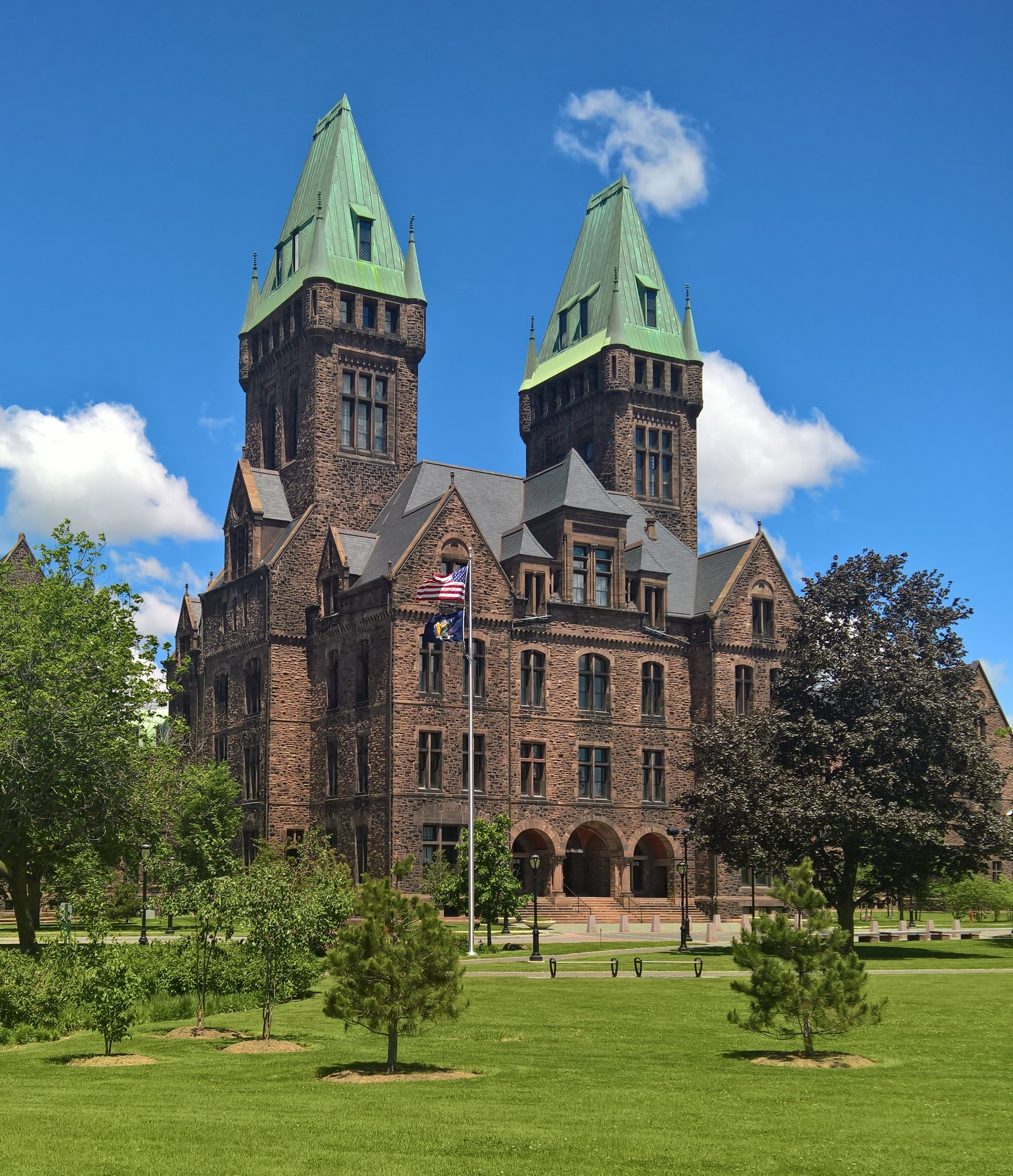
South elevation, 2017

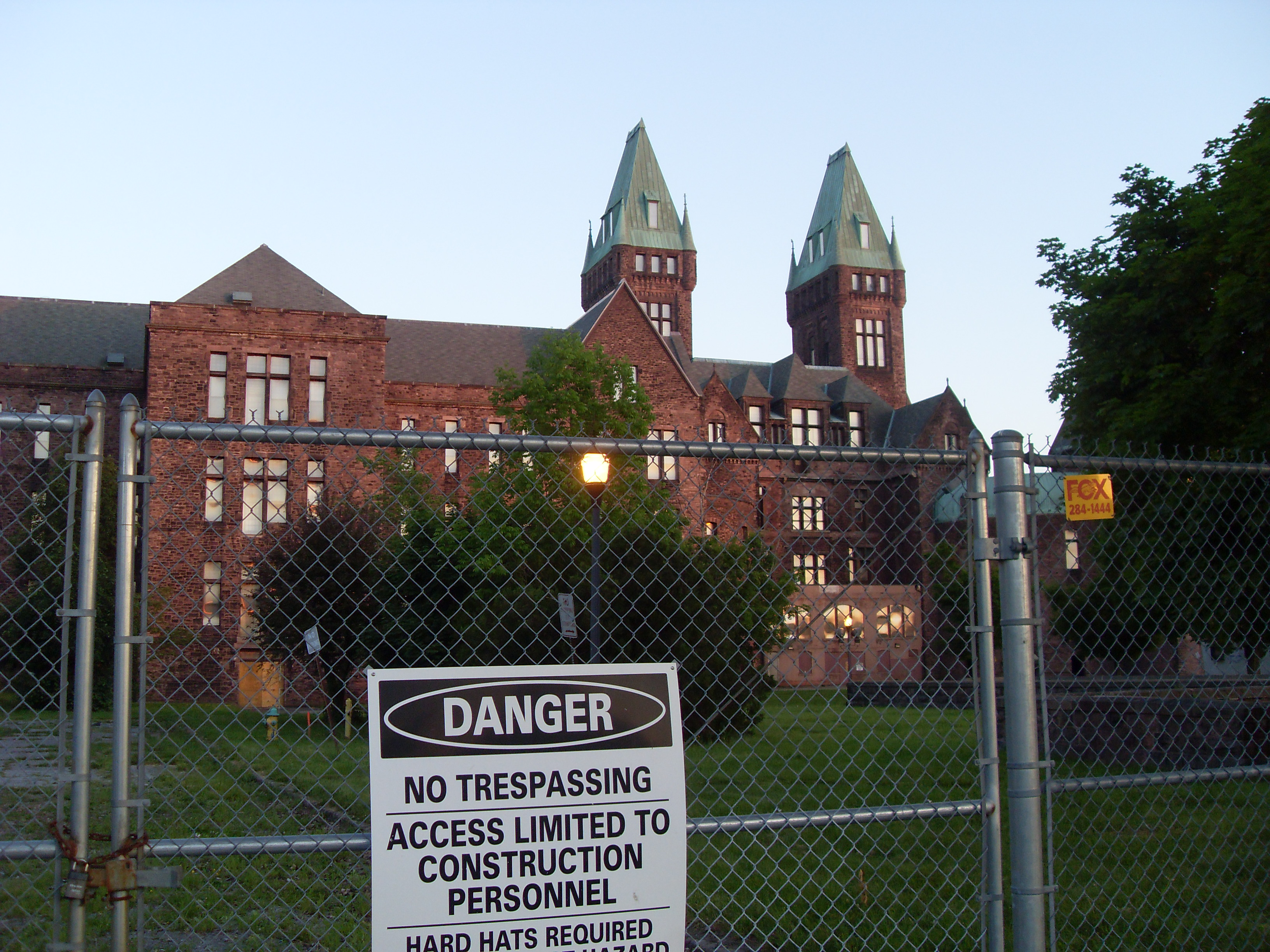
Under renovation in 2008

The Richardson Olmsted Campus is a former mental hospital campus in Buffalo, New York, United States. Dating from the late 19th century, it was designed by architect Henry Hobson Richardson and landscape designers Frederick Law Olmsted and Calvert Vaux as the Buffalo State Asylum for the Insane. It incorporated a system of treatment for people with mental illness developed by Dr. Thomas Story Kirkbride known as the Kirkbride Plan. Over the years, as mental health treatment changed and resources were diverted, the buildings and grounds began a slow deterioration. By 1974, the last patients were removed from the historic wards. In 1986, the campus was designated a National Historic Landmark.

In 2006, the Richardson Center Corporation was formed to restore the buildings. Today, the Richardson Olmsted Campus is being converted, beginning with the now open Hotel Richardson within the Towers Building and two flanking buildings (about one-third of the Campus). Future plans for the site include the construction of a new museum in Buffalo's cultural corridor, known as the Lipsey Architecture Center Buffalo. The museum will focus on the city's rich architectural history and collection of now-preserved buildings.

== History ==
In 1865, Senator Asher P. Nichols introduced a bill for additional mental health asylums to be built in New York State, with one dedicated to servicing the western portion of the state.

Nichol's request was approved, and towns across Western New York began to enter bids to become the home of the new asylum. Buffalo was chosen from a group of possible locations that included Lockport, Batavia, and Warsaw. The City of Buffalo promised to supply the future asylum with 100 years of free drinking water, and its location in a rural setting close to a bustling downtown was ideal for the Kirkbride Plan. Kirkbride had called for a patient population of around 300, but Buffalo physician Dr. John P. Gray (who was overseeing the project), increased that number to about 600.

The large Medina red sandstone and brick hospital buildings were designed in 1870 in the Kirkbride Plan by architect Henry Hobson Richardson, and the grounds were designed by landscape architect Frederick Law Olmsted.

Construction started in 1871, with the cornerstone being placed the following year in 1872. On November 15, 1880, the Buffalo State Asylum for the Insane admitted patients for the first time, although only the eastern wards had been completed (the western side would not be finished until 1895).

In 1889, New York State approved funding for the remainder of the asylum to be constructed. H.H. Richardson had died in 1886, so architects Green and Wicks (Edward Brodhead Green), and William W. Carlin finished the project. Certain elements changed, but the new architects attempted to emulate Richardson's distinct style for the remainder of the asylum.

The next year in 1890, the Buffalo State Asylum for the Insane changed its name to the Buffalo State Hospital. That same year, New York passed new legislation establishing mental health treatment as the state's responsibility. A facility built for around 600, soon became overcrowded.

The remainder of the western wards were finished in 1895. Patients were now segregated by sex, with women in the western wings and men in the eastern wings.

In 1918, Richardson's iconic towers that were covered in clay-tile roofing, were re-covered in copper.

The 100 acre farm that existed on site and was once used for agricultural therapy was sold by New York State in 1927 to Buffalo State University. This decreased the campus's size from 203 acres, to around 100. Six years later in 1933, part of the Olmsted-designed green space (known as the South Lawn), was paved over to create a parking lot.

In the early 1960s, three male wards are demolished to make room for a modern rehabilitation center. The Strozzi Building was completed in 1964, essentially marking the final decline of the original asylum.

In 1973, the Asylum was added to the National Register of Historic Places.

The last patients were moved out of the original asylum wards in 1974.

In 1986, it was designated as a National Historic Landmark.

The towers building remained open as office space until 1990. Afterwards, the Richardson-designed structure sat unoccupied and decaying for almost twenty years (further out wards had already been abandoned much earlier). In 2006, the Richardson Center Corporation, a non-profit dedicated to the preservation of the campus, gained control of the property and completed initial stabilization.

=== Architecture ===
The man selected to design the Buffalo State Asylum in May 1870, was Henry Hobson Richardson. Although born on a plantation near New Orleans, he was an 1858 graduate of Harvard College. From there attended the Ecole des Beaux-Arts (School of Fine Arts) in Paris. Afterwards, he started working as a draftsman in an architectural firm in France.

In New York City after returning from France, he became acquainted with Frederick Law Olmsted. They were neighbors on Staten Island, had offices near one another on Broadway, and the two had similar artistic tastes. When Olmsted was invited to Buffalo in 1869 to design a park for the city, he met with some of the city's leading citizens. Among them was William Dorsheimer, a successful lawyer (and later Lieutenant Governor of New York), who asked Olmsted to recommend an architect to design a new house for Dorsheimer. Olmsted recommended Richardson, and the house he designed for Dorsheimer still stands at 438 Delaware Avenue.

Dorsheimer would later chair the ten member committee assigned to select the asylum's architect. Based on Dorsheimer's experience with him, he directed the committee in its meeting of May 1870, to hire Richardson.

The Buffalo State Asylum for the Insane, the largest commission of Richardson's career, marked the advent of his characteristic Romanesque Revival style. When emulated by later architects, this style is referred to as Richardsonian Romanesque. It has been the subject of a long-term preservation campaign. Nevertheless, three pavilions on the east side were demolished in the 1970s to make way for newer psychiatric facilities. In 1927, the northern farmlands were transferred back to the State for the development of what is today Buffalo State College.

Architectural plans and drawings are in the H.H. Richardson Collection in the Houghton Library at Harvard University.

== Olmsted and landscape design ==
Plans for the asylum grounds were created in about 1870 by Frederick Law Olmsted and Calvert Vaux, the partners who had designed Central Park in Manhattan and Prospect Park in Brooklyn. However, before they were implemented, the plans were lost and the partnership broke up. Olmsted then created another plan, and a partial record of which still exists today.

This plan shows the southeast corner of the front of the asylum, that is, the land south of the administrative (towers) building to Forest Avenue and everything east to Elmwood Avenue. On this ground was laid out an entrance road that looped from Forest Avenue to the front of the administration building and a large curving path in front of the east wing of the hospital in the angle of Forest and Elmwood Avenues. More paths ran in front of the hospital wing. A sunken carriage path was also intended in the southeast corner of the property, but this was never constructed.

On this ground, Olmsted's plan called for the planting of 150 trees, and up to 2000 shrubs. Except in the far southeast corner, the trees were spaced well apart and created an almost forest-like environment. Early photos suggest Olmsted let trees that were already growing on the site remain. The trees and shrubs were selected for contrasting shapes, sizes, and leaf appearance. The overall intent was to create what was termed a "pastoral landscape", and it was Olmsted's intent that this open landscape allow the public to see onto the property and the buildings themselves, and for the patients to clearly see the outer world during their walks on the grounds and through their windows.

Today, all that remains of Olmsted's plantings are two Swamp White Oaks that stand directly in front of the administrative building and a huge White Ash that stands near the property's fence line along Forest Avenue. Until 2019, an original Silver Maple also stood in front of the east wing of the Buffalo Psychiatric Center property.

== Mental health treatment in early America ==
Now seen in a negative light by some, at the time mental health asylums were a revolutionary concept and a huge step forward in care for the mentally ill. Many asylums placed an emphasis not only on medical practices, but on architecture and design as well. Living at an asylum was not meant to only impact mental health issues, but to cure them. Before this movement, the mentally ill were often housed in almshouses and jails, and were often subjected to archaic practices like bloodletting, isolation, and restraintment.

The first hospital to focus solely on mental health opened in 1773 in Williamsburg, Virginia and was known as the Eastern State Hospital. In the early parts of the 19th century, more mental hospitals were established across the United States including McLean Hospital in Boston, Friend's Asylum in Philadelphia, and the Hartford Retreat for the Insane in Connecticut. While undoubtedly influenced by the treatment of the mentally ill in Europe, some historians believe that asylums in America grew out of the Jacksonian Era. This period was marked by financial fluctuation, social change, and growing interconnectivity, and historians believe the need for "order" saw with it an increased need for asylums.

The need to create livable places to house the mentally ill became apparent by the mid-19th century. Reformers like Dorothea Dix began to push for more funding and legislation aimed at creating mental health asylums across the United States. Dix travelled across both the United States and Europe, advocating for the importance of asylums and bringing the issue to the forefront of the American consciousness. Perhaps her greatest contribution to the effort, was the proposed Bill for the Benefit of the Indigent Insane (1854). Later struck down by President Franklin Pierce, this bill would have set aside ten million acres of federal land for the construction of mental health facilities. Dix may have been unsuccessful, but her efforts directly correlated to the construction of 32 mental health hospitals across the United States.

At the conclusion of the American Civil War in 1865, a renewed focus on the construction of mental health facilities swept across America.

== Thomas Story Kirkbride and the Kirkbride Plan ==
Thomas Story Kirkbride was born in Morrisville, Pennsylvania on July 31, 1809. Kirkbride was born into a Quaker family, and was the great-great-grandson of Joseph Kirkbride, who was one of the original settlers in Pennsylvania in 1682. At 18, he began his formal education at The College of New Jersey. In 1831, he enrolled at the University of Pennsylvania and obtained his surgeon's degree in 1832. Post-education, he became a resident physician at The Quaker Asylum at Frankfurt.

From 1835 to 1841, he opened his own practice in Philadelphia that focused on neurological and psychosurgical practices. In October 1840, he was named Superintendent of the Pennsylvania Hospital for the Insane, and began admitting patients the following year. In 1844 he helped found the Association of Medical Superintendents of American Institutions for the Insane (AMSAII). From 1862 to 1870, he served as secretary, and then president of the AMSAII.

The Kirkbride Plan was the approach to mental health care created by Thomas Story Kirkbride, and highlighted in his work, On the Construction, Organization, and General Arrangements of Hospitals for the Insane with Some Remarks on Insanity and Its Treatment. His concepts were revolutionary for the 19th century, and were rooted in a system of mental health treatment known as moral treatment. Moral treatment was based on humane psychological care and moral discipline. Moral treatment grew out of The Enlightenment, which promoted ideals like individual rights and social reform. William Tuke and Philippe Pinel are often credited with developing this form of treatment.

Kirkbride believed that in many cases, mental health problems could be treated as an acute issue. The asylum was intended to provide refuge from everyday life, and the environment a patient was in was just as important as the medical treatment they were receiving. Kirkbride placed a direct emphasis on fresh air, sunlight, and exercise, and believed they were directly involved in treating mental illness.

When it came to layout, the Kirkbride Plan prescribed a v-shaped grounds with one central administrative building. The Kirkbride Plan was also known as the "congregate plan" or "linear plan". The plan is remarkable for being the first scientific architectural response to mental health care.

The Kirkbride Plan also gave recommendations for the interior layout and size of an asylum. In Kirkbride's own words, "Each ward should have in it a parlor, a dining room with a dumb waiter connected with it, a speaking tube/telephone leading to the kitchen, a corridor, single lodging rooms for patients, a dormitory with no less than 4 beds, one or two larger patient rooms for those requiring an attendant, a clothes room, a bathroom, and a wash/sink room."

Ward corridors were to be at least 12 feet wide. Patient rooms were to be 11 feet deep by 9 feet wide, and would include just one single bed. Rooms were to be 16 feet high with wood floors and soundproofing. Kirkbride also called for the max number of patients to be around 250 (the Buffalo State Asylum increased this number to 600).

Fireproofing was also important to Kirkbride's plan. Every building connector was to have stone floors, and iron doors on one side that could be closed to avert fire.

In adherence to the Kirkbride Plan, the Richardson Olmsted Campus (Buffalo State Asylum for the Insane) consists of a central administrative tower and five pavilions or wards progressively set back on each side, for eleven buildings total, all connected by short curved two-story corridors. Patients were segregated by sex, males on the east side, females on the west. Patients that required the most attention were placed in the outermost wards. As their situations improved, they would be subsequently moved further in towards the administration building. Once there, patients could engage in more social activities. Some examples include agricultural therapy, baseball, and holiday parties.

By the 1900s, asylums gave way to "state hospitals". This change in vernacular illustrated the shifting view on patient treatment and the overall declining stigma placed on mental health. More standard Kirkbride Plan asylums also gave way to the new "cottage plan" configuration. Instead of one sprawling asylum building, the cottage plan consisted of numerous out-buildings that each focused on one specific thing (tuberculosis building, surgery building, etc.). It is during this time that a collection of out-buildings are constructed at the Richardson Olmsted Campus.

In the mid-20th century, the Buffalo State Hospital (Buffalo State Asylum for the Insane), saw an unmanageable influx of patients suffering from chronic issues. What was once a facility designed to cure acute illnesses, quickly became overcrowded. By 1940, a facility designed to hold around 600 patients had seen their patient population balloon to almost 4,000. In 1963, the then-modern Strozzi Building was constructed on campus to address these concerns.

Patient records from 1881 to 1975 are in the collection of the New York State Archives in Albany, NY.

== Preservation efforts ==
The Preservation Coalition of Erie County (renamed "Preservation Buffalo Niagara" in October 2008) filed a lawsuit resulting in New York State establishing the Richardson Center Corporation in 2006 to rehabilitate the site and the State committing $100 million towards rehabilitation. Both former New York State Assembly Member Sam Hoyt, and former Buffalo State College President Muriel A. Howard, were involved in plans for the restoration and reuse of the Richardson.

Perimeter fencing and lighting were installed and a Peace Officer was hired to conduct regular patrols and prevent and deter further crime at the complex. On March 5, 2008, stabilization began with the most severely damaged buildings, including the roof and down-spouts. Stabilization was completed in 2012.

On April 10, 2010, a fire occurred. The cause of the fire was under investigation. Damage was estimated at $200,000.

In 2013, the South Lawn landscape on the property was completed.

During the planning stages, the Richardson Center Corporation has used an active public process, aimed to help to inform the Master Plan during all phases of redevelopment for the Campus, including several public meetings. A Community Advisory Group includes representatives from the adjacent neighborhoods, business districts, cultural institutions, Buffalo Psychiatric Center, SUNY Buffalo State, and historic preservation groups.

=== Hotel Henry Urban Resort Conference Center ===
On January 25, 2013, Phase I plans were announced to redevelop one third of the Campus into Hotel Henry Urban Resort Conference Center, 100 Acres: The Kitchens at Hotel Henry and the Buffalo Architecture Center, both within the Towers Building and two flanking buildings. It was named for the building's architect, Henry C. Urban.

This first phase of redevelopment was completed in 2016. Hotel Henry and the 100 Acres opened in May 2017. In 2020, due to the stress of the global COVID-19 pandemic, Hotel Henry closed.

== Douglas Development and Richardson Hotel ==
In 2021, Douglas Development Corporation (Douglas Jemal) began leasing the property from the non-profit Richardson Center Corporation, with the intent to restore the remaining buildings on Campus.

In March 2023, Douglas Development Corporation re-opened the hotel under the new name Hotel Richardson. The hotel has a total of 88 rooms, and is walking distance from numerous Buffalo museums like the Buffalo AKG Art Museum, Burchfield Penney Art Center, and Buffalo History Museum.

== The RCC and Greenwood Hospitality to Oversee the Richardson Hotel ==
As of July 1st, 2025, the Richardson Center Corporation (RCC) ended its agreement with Douglas Development. Now, the non-profit RCC is directly overseeing hotel operations. The RCC have contracted Greenwood Hospitality Group, a national hotelier company, to operate the Richardson Hotel.

== Lipsey Architecture Center Buffalo ==
As of summer 2023, planning continues for the construction of the Lipsey Architecture Center Buffalo at the Richardson Olmsted Campus. The proposed cultural institution will focus on Western New York's rich architectural history.

Recently, the LACB opened two exhibits on the ground floor of the Hotel Richardson. One with a focus on general Buffalo architecture, and one that provides a brief history of the Buffalo State Asylum for the Insane.

Construction on the new expansion designed by Boston-based firm Höweler+Yoon has started as of Fall 2025. A groundbreaking ceremony was held on October 23rd, 2025 to commemorate the start of the project. With a projected completion date of early 2027, the space with have thirteen exhibits, a theatre, and gift shop.

== In popular culture ==
Lizzie D. Cottier surreptitiously wrote a novel, The Right Spirit, in 1885 while committed to the Buffalo State Asylum.

In 1983 a portion of a ground floor hallway and one hospital room were prepared to appear as a maternity ward and used as a location for The Natural, where the character Roy Hobbs, as played by Robert Redford, was shown recovering from internal injuries.

Mount Massive Asylum, the main setting for the 2013 horror game Outlast, was modeled after the Richardson Olmsted Complex.
