= F. L. Ames Gardener's Cottage =

- U.S. National Historic Landmark District – Contributing property
- U.S. Historic district – Contributing property
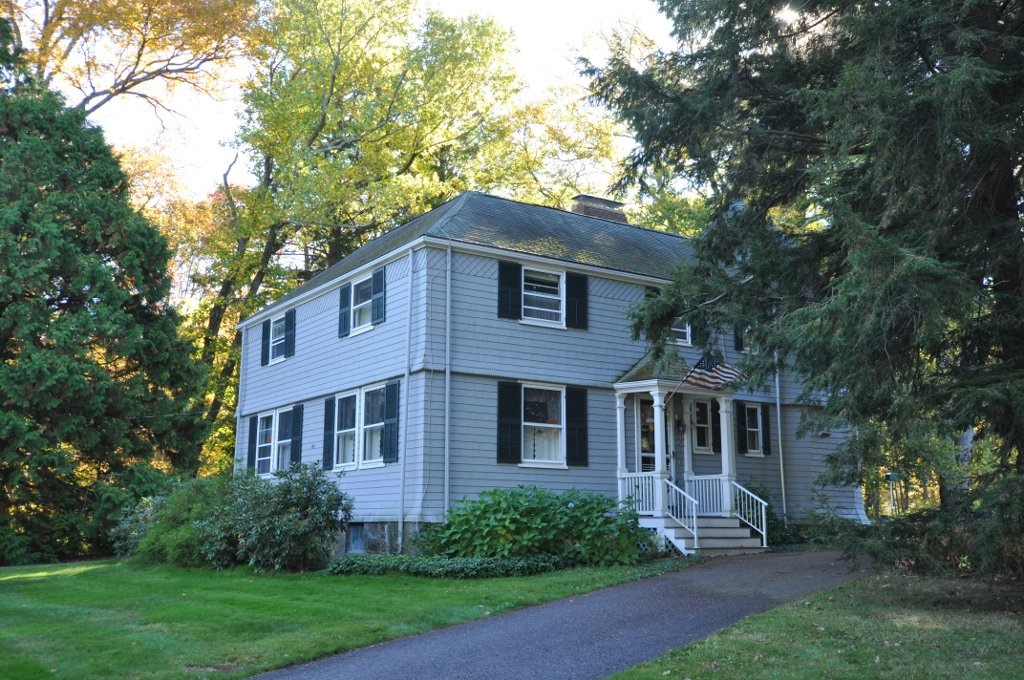
- Location: Easton, Massachusetts
- Coordinates: 42°4′25″N 71°5′36″W
- Built: 1884-1885
- Architect: Henry Hobson Richardson
- Architectural style: Richardsonian Romanesque
- Part of: H. H. Richardson Historic District of North Easton (ID87002598)

Significant dates
- Designated NHLDCP: December 23, 1987
- Designated CP: November 3, 1972

The F. L. Ames Gardener's Cottage is a small residential house in North Easton, Massachusetts. This building was designed in 1884 by noted American architect Henry Hobson Richardson and built the following year. This building sits on the original Ames estate and was designed soon after the neighboring Ames Gate Lodge (also a Richardson design). Frederick Lothrop Ames also commissioned Richardson to build the nearby Old Colony Railroad Station. Two other notable buildings in North Easton, the Ames Free Library and Oakes Ames Memorial Hall, were also Richardson designs and commissioned by the Ames family.

The exterior of the Gardener's house has been renovated and is not easily identified as a Richardson building. However the footprint and structure remain intact, including a circular tower on one corner of the house. The ivy-covered walls, long associated with this building, were removed during the renovation.

== See also ==
- H. H. Richardson Historic District of North Easton
- North Easton Historic District
- Frederick Lothrop Ames
