= North Easton Historic District =

Historic district in Massachusetts, United States

- U.S. National Register of Historic Places
- U.S. Historic district
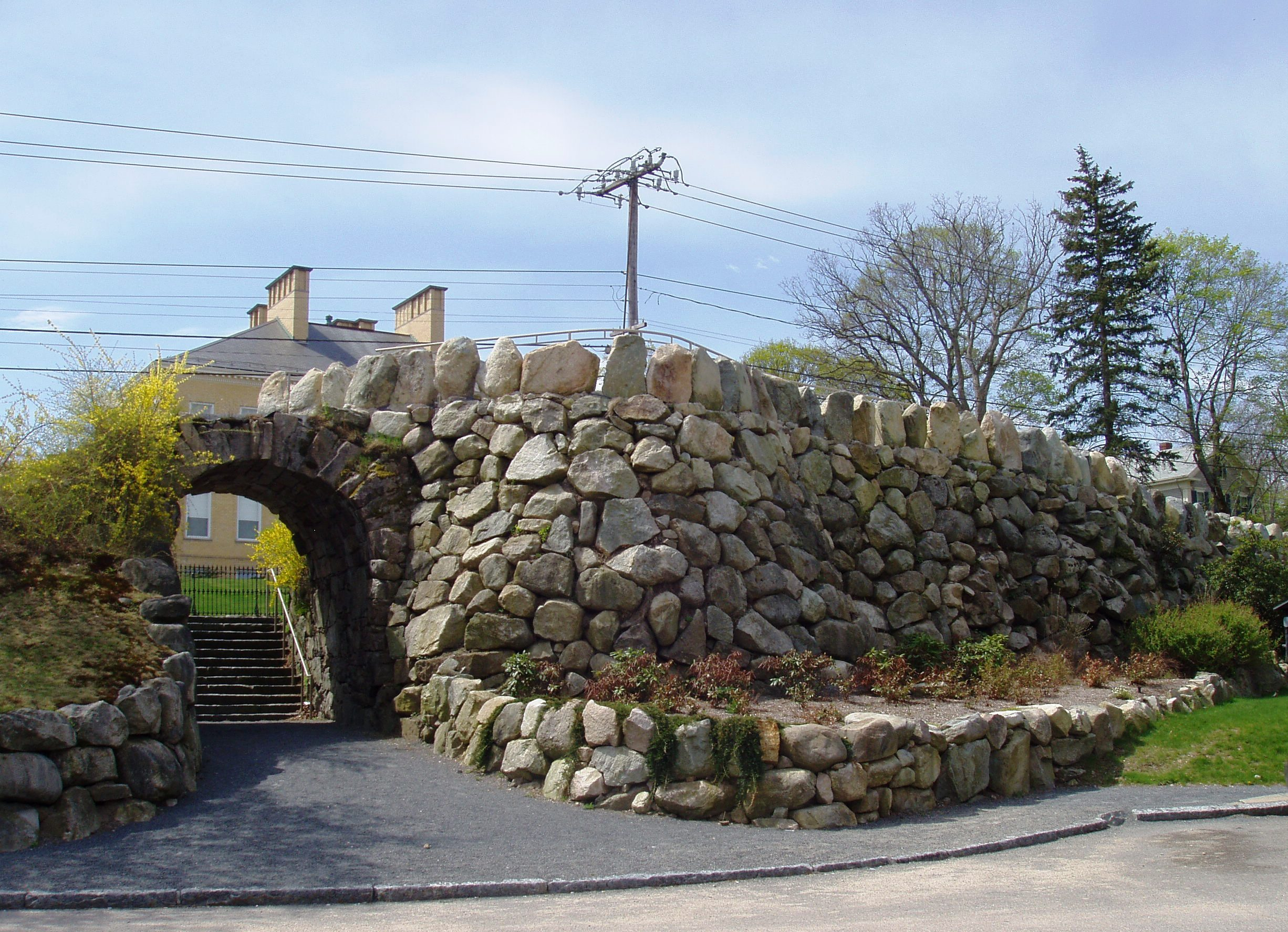
- The Rockery

- Location within Massachusetts Location within the United States
- Location: Easton, Massachusetts
- Coordinates: 42°4′13″N 71°5′59″W
- Area: 500 acres (200 ha)
- Architect: Richardson, Henry Hobson; Olmsted, Frederick Law
- Architectural style: Greek Revival, Late Victorian, Gothic Revival
- NRHP reference No.: 72000119
- Added to NRHP: November 3, 1972

The North Easton Historic District is a historic district in Easton, Massachusetts encompassing a cohesive village area developed in the late 19th and early 20th centuries, primarily through the activities of the locally important Ames family. The district was added to the National Register of Historic Places in 1972. In 1987, a portion of the district was designated a National Historic Landmark District, known as the H. H. Richardson Historic District of North Easton, which includes several buildings designed for the Ameses by architect H. H. Richardson.

== Description and history ==
The North Easton Historic District is bounded on the east by Massachusetts Route 138, the south by Main and Lincoln Streets, the west by Main Street, and the north by Elm Street. The largest features of this area are the estates of the Ames family and their former industrial sites, when they were leading manufacturers of shovels and other tools. The district includes rows of worker housing built by the Ameses for their workers, and the former Ames Company factory, located near the railroad tracks that run north-south through the district just east of Main Street.

The district's most sophisticated architectural elements are in its public buildings, and in the estates of the Ames family. Early examples include the Gothic Revival architecture of Queset, possibly designed by Andrew Jackson Downing and built about 1854, and Langwater, a Second Empire house built in 1859. Most notable, however are five buildings designed by H. H. Richardson in his signature Richardsonian Romanesque style, which were designed a National Historic Landmark District in 1987. These include the Ames Free Library and Oakes Ames Memorial Hall, sited on a parcel landscaped by Frederick Law Olmsted, the Old Colony Railroad Station, the Ames Gate Lodge, and the F. L. Ames Gardener's Cottage.

== Contributing properties ==
- 66 Main Street (former post office)
- Ames Shovel Shop
- Ames Stable
- The Rockery
- H. H. Richardson Historic District of North Easton
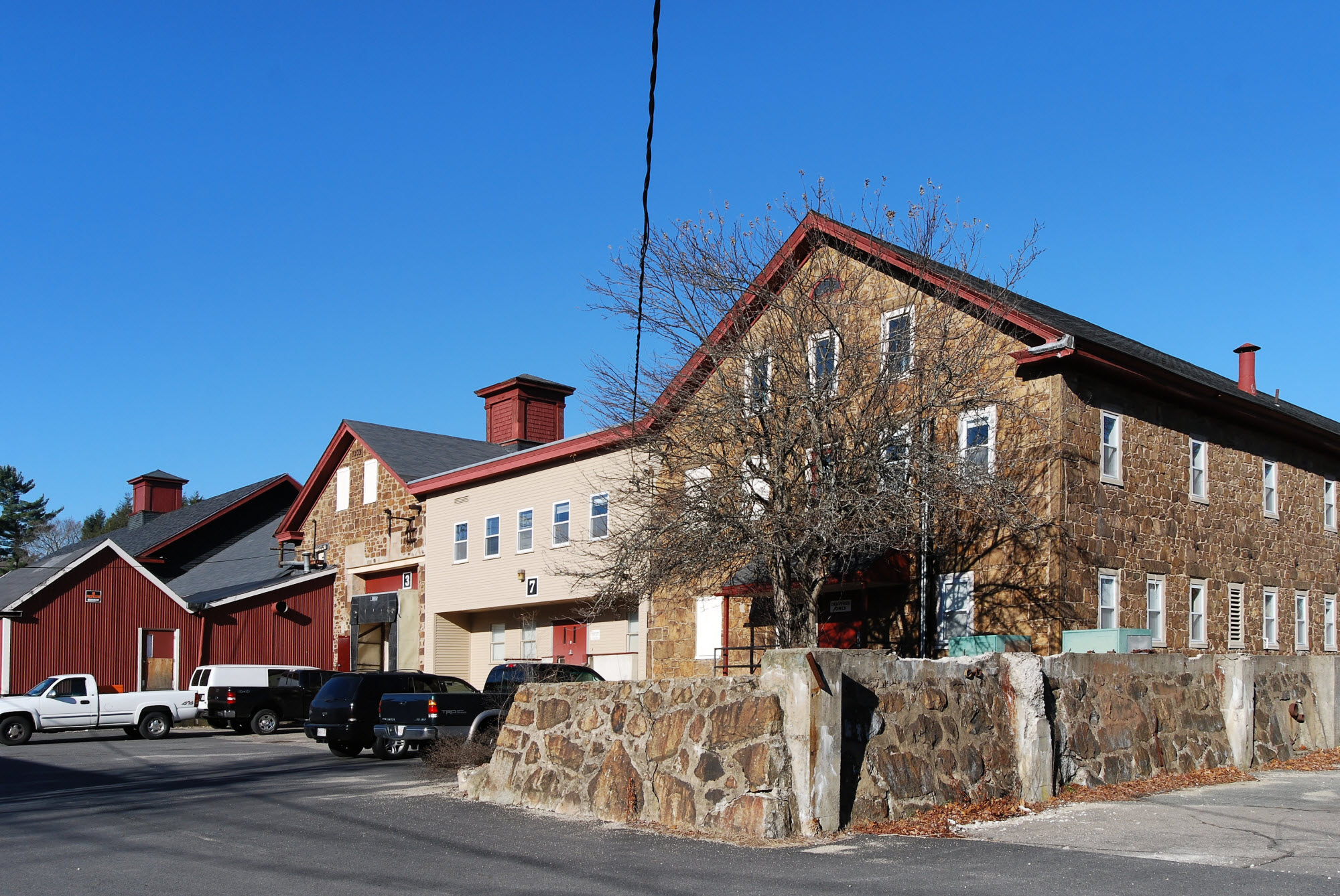
Ames Shovel Shop

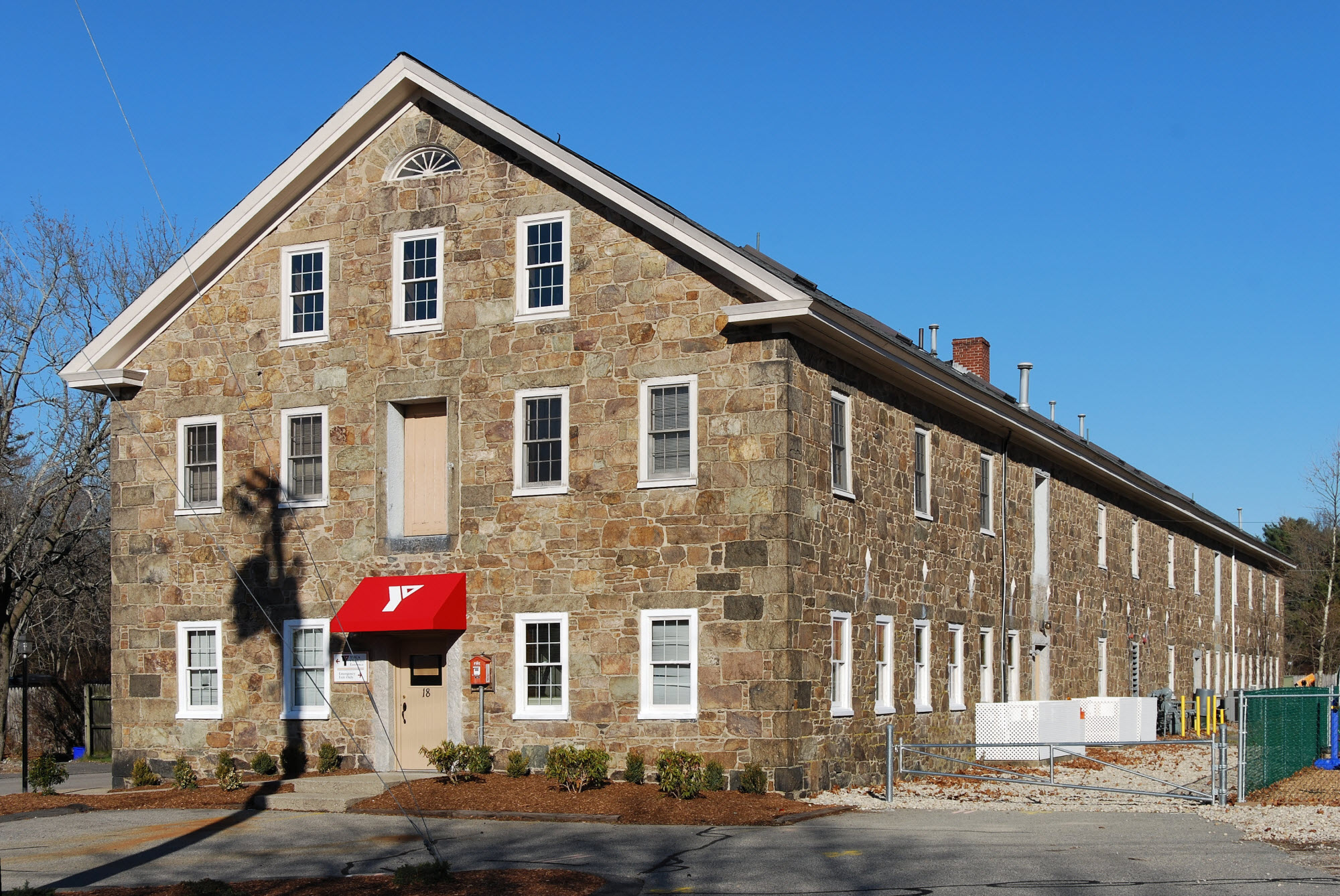
Ames Handle Shop

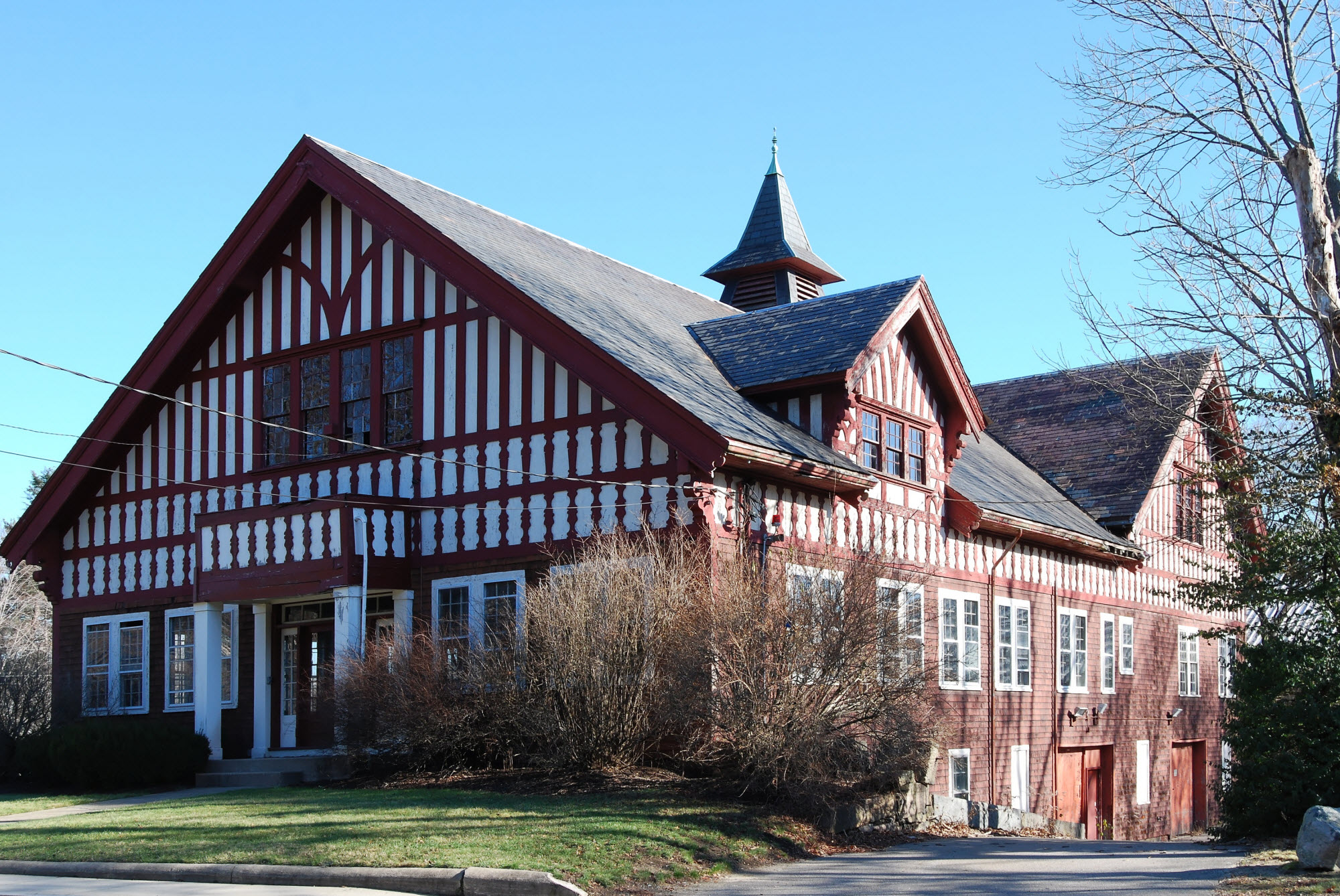
Ames stable (1897)

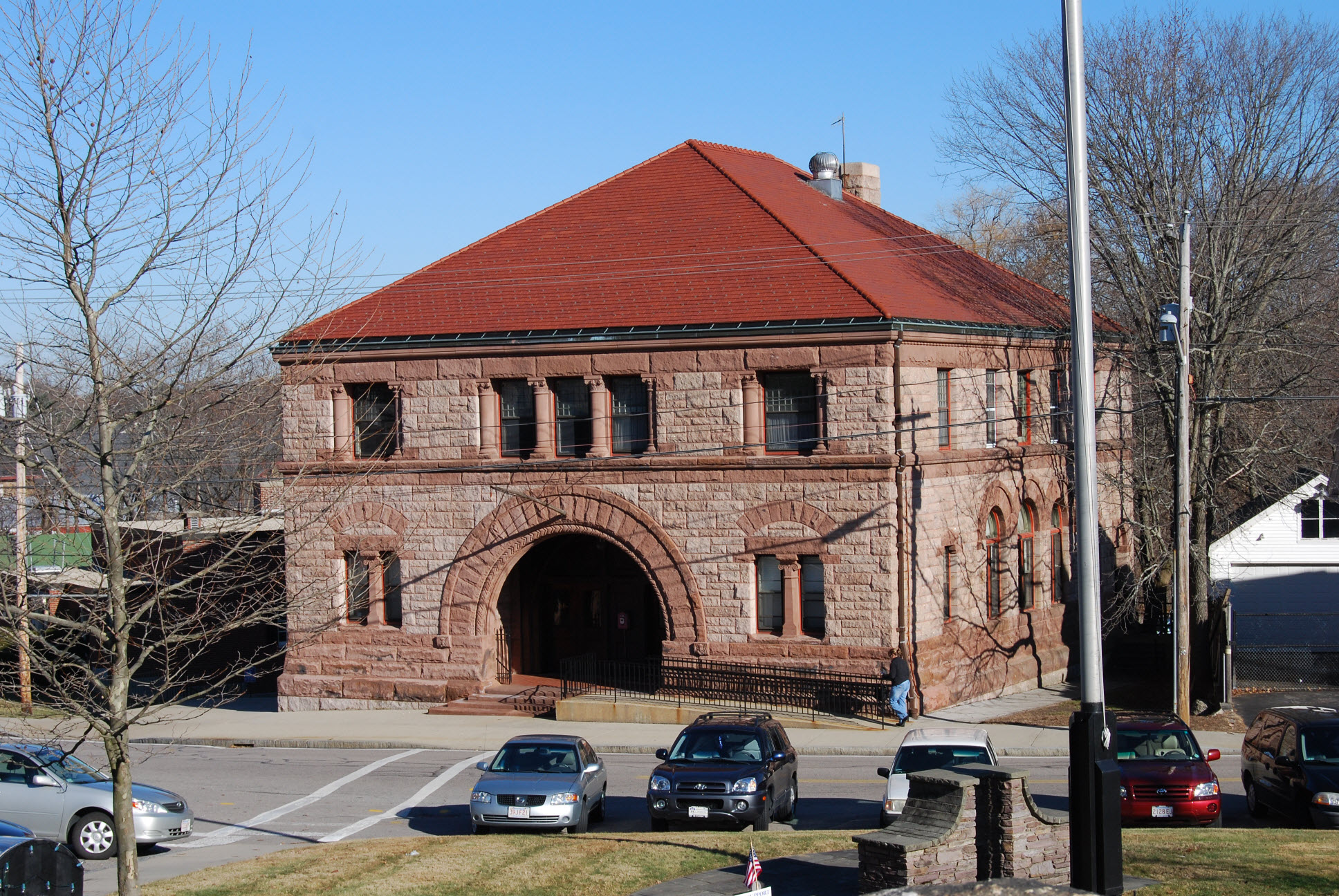
66 Main Street

== See also ==
- National Register of Historic Places listings in Bristol County, Massachusetts
