= H. H. Richardson Historic District of North Easton =

Historic district in Massachusetts, United States

- U.S. National Register of Historic Places
- U.S. National Historic Landmark District
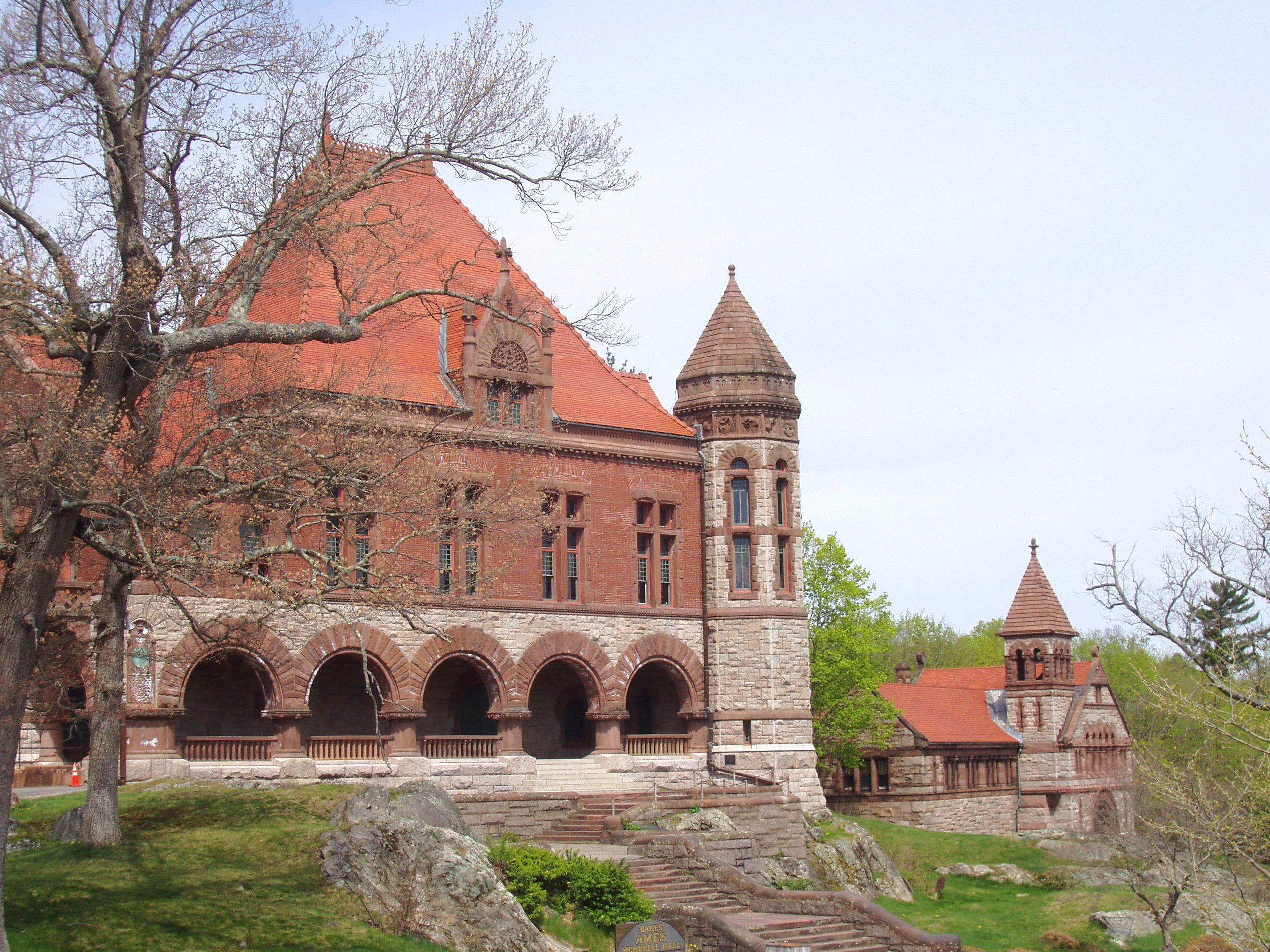
- Oakes Ames Memorial Hall and Ames Free Library, two of the five buildings in the landmark district

- Location within Massachusetts Location within the United States
- Location: Main St., Elm St., & railway right-of-way off Oliver St., Easton, Massachusetts
- Coordinates: 42°4′12″N 71°6′2″W
- Area: 5.8 acres (23,000 m^{2})
- Architect: H. H. Richardson; Frederick Law Olmsted
- NRHP reference No.: 87002598

Significant dates
- Added to NRHP: December 23, 1987
- Designated NHLD: December 23, 1987

The H. H. Richardson Historic District of North Easton is a National Historic Landmark District in the village of North Easton in Easton, Massachusetts. It consists of five buildings designed by noted 19th-century architect Henry Hobson Richardson, and The Rockery, a war memorial designed by Frederick Law Olmsted. It was declared a National Historic Landmark in 1987.

The landmark district is contained within the larger North Easton Historic District which was added to the National Register of Historic Places on November 3, 1972. It also contains the Old Colony Railroad Station which was individually listed on the NRHP on April 11, 1972.

== History ==
Easton was first settled in 1694 and was officially incorporated in 1725. In 1694, the first settler, Clement Briggs established his home near the Easton Green. In 1711, the Taunton North Purchase area became Norton, and in 1713, the twenty-six families settled in Easton and hired Elder William Pratt as their first minister. There was no legal parish in Easton until 1722 when the East Precinct of Norton was recognized. In 1725, the area was incorporated as the Town of Easton; it was so named because it was formerly called the "East End" of the Taunton North Purchase and was shortened by pronunciation to Easton.

In 1803, the Ames Shovel Company was established and became nationally known as having provided the shovels which laid the Union Pacific Railroad and opened the west. In 1875, the shovel production of the Ames plant was worth 1.5 million. The most notable of the Ames family were Oakes Ames, a key figure in the Crédit Mobilier of America scandal, and Oliver Ames, governor of Massachusetts from 1887 to 1890.

The Ames family shaped the town's economy and was responsible for the presence of a number of landmark buildings in the town designed by H. H. Richardson, originator of the Richardsonian Romanesque style and designer of Trinity Church in Boston.

The five Richardson buildings in the Historic Landmark District include:

- Ames Free Library
- Oakes Ames Memorial Hall
- Old Colony Railroad Station (houses the Easton Historical Society; original NRHP designation, April 1972)
- Ames Gate Lodge (located on Elm Street; privately owned by the Ames family)
- F. L. Ames Gardener's Cottage

== Other associated buildings ==
Though this school complex was not made by Richardson himself, it was dedicated to him and made in his style:

- H. H. Richardson/F. L. Olmsted Intermediate School

Although intended to be the town hall, the Oakes Ames Memorial Hall was never accepted by the town and never used for that purpose.

In addition, there is a commercial building at 66 Main Street which was designed and built in the nineteenth century by Richardson's office in a Richardsonian style. The Richardson buildings are all located within a compact area designated as the H. H. Richardson Historic District. The area also includes The Rockery, designed by Frederick Law Olmsted, who also landscaped grounds of Oakes Ames Memorial Hall and the Ames Free Library.

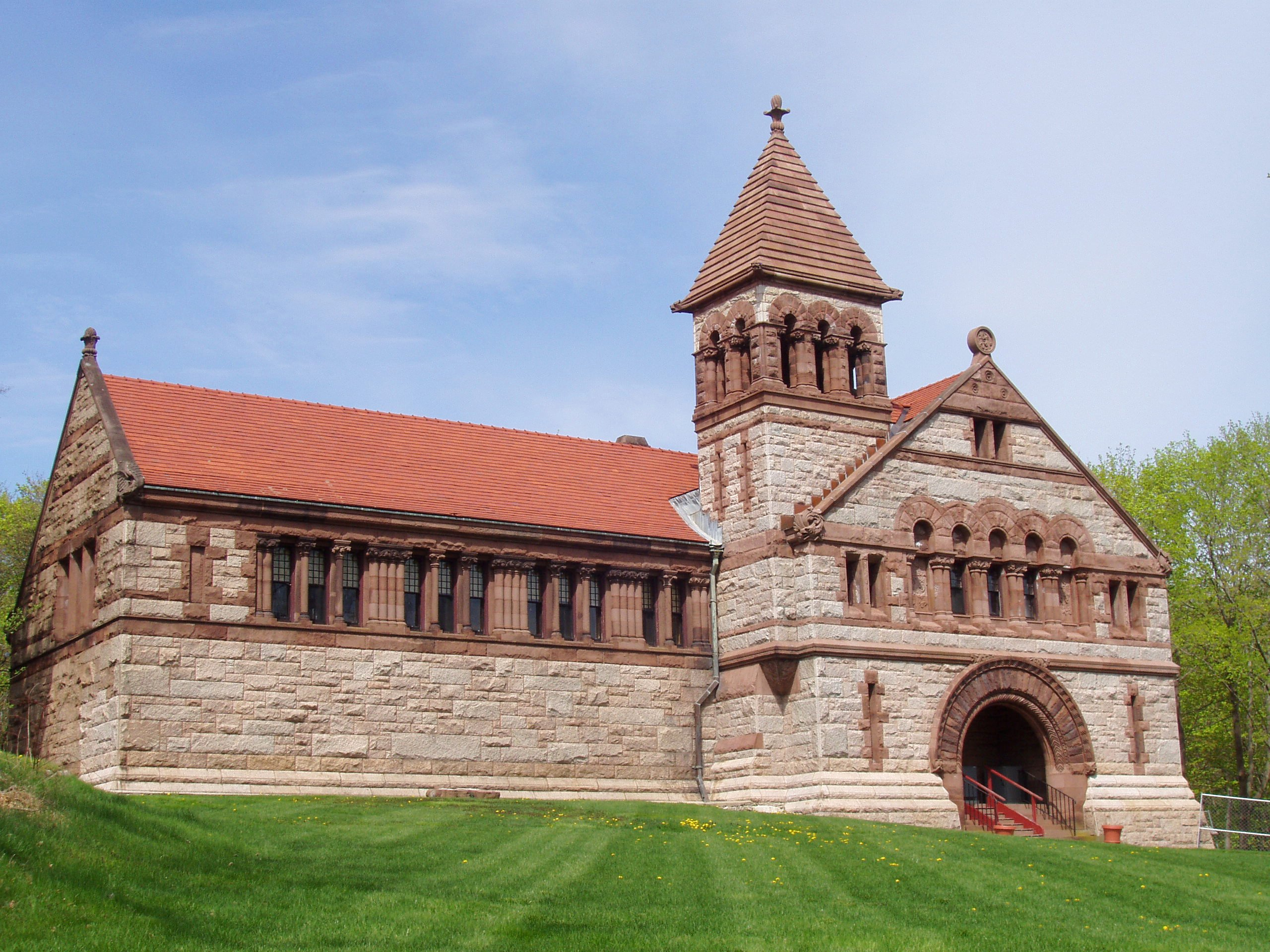
Ames Free Library

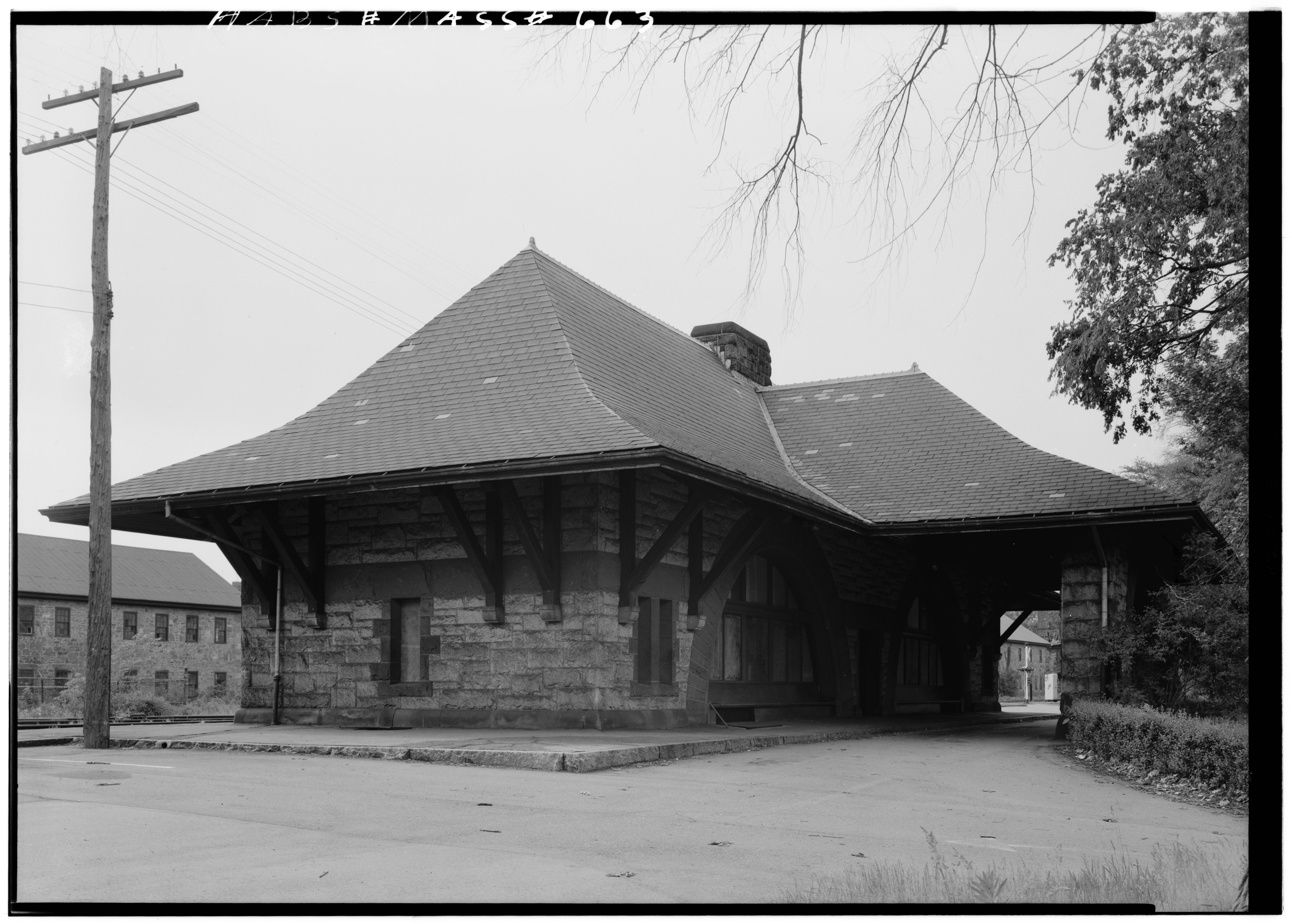
Old Colony Railroad Station

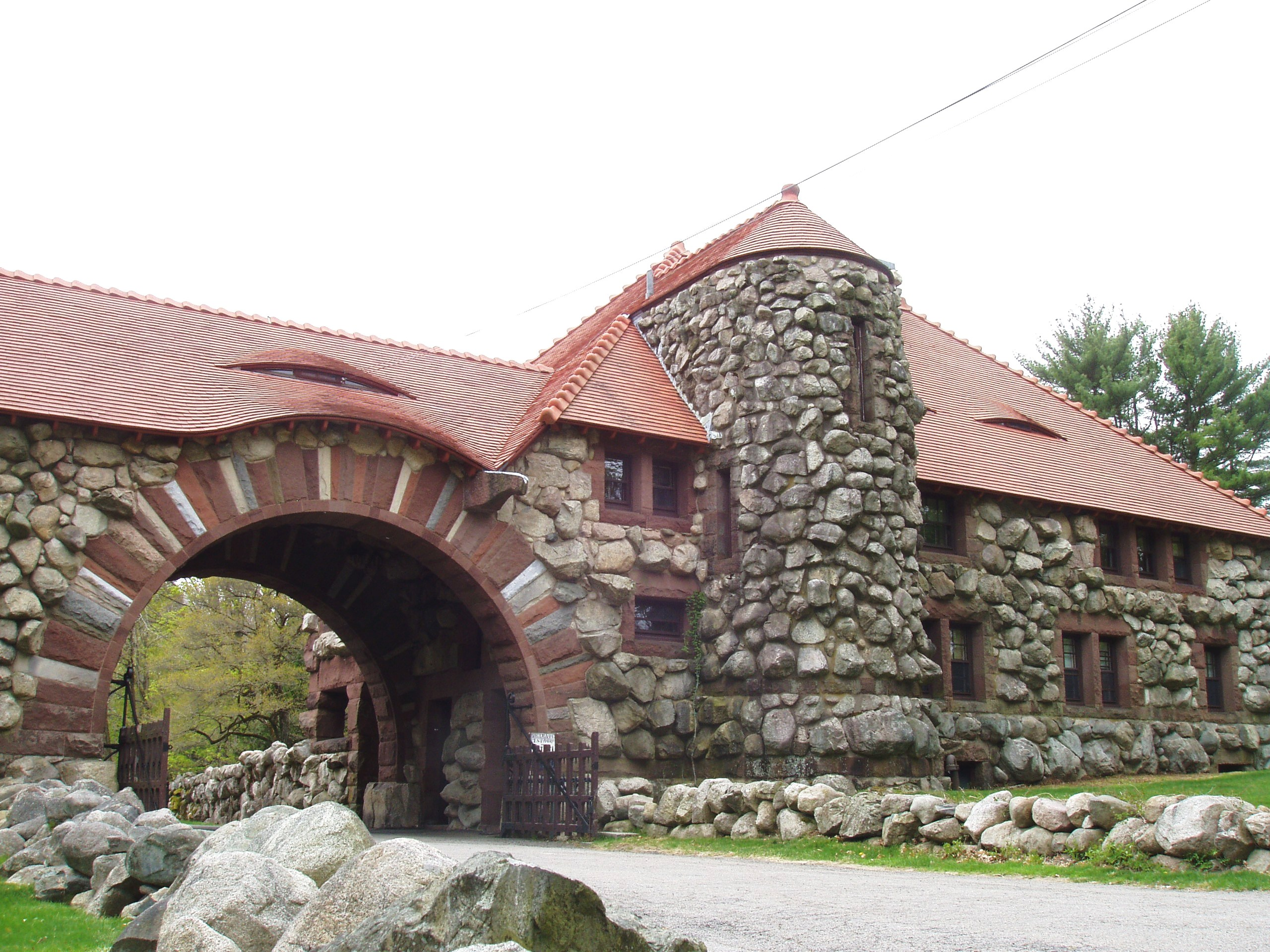
Ames Gate Lodge

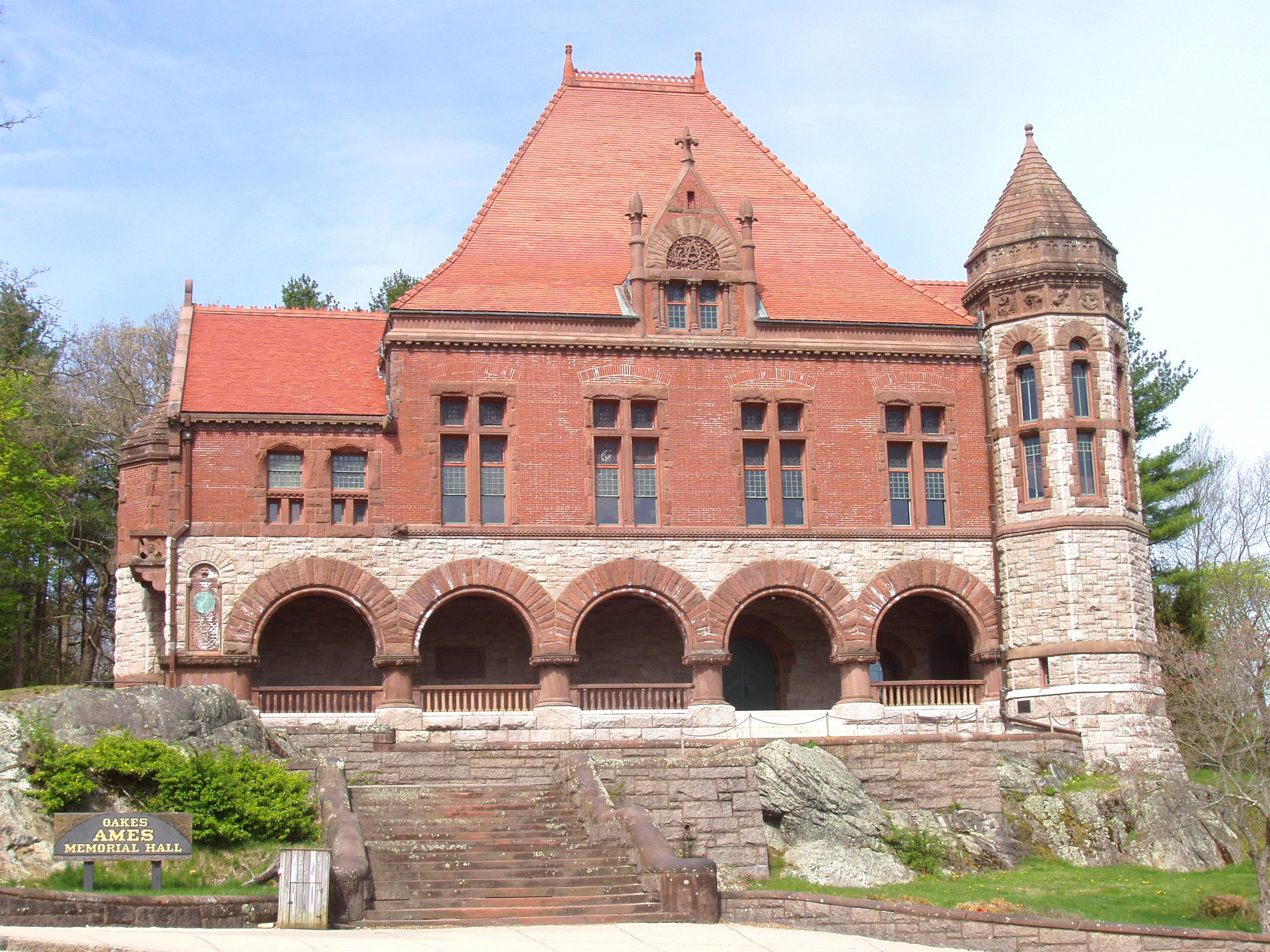
Oakes Ames Memorial Hall

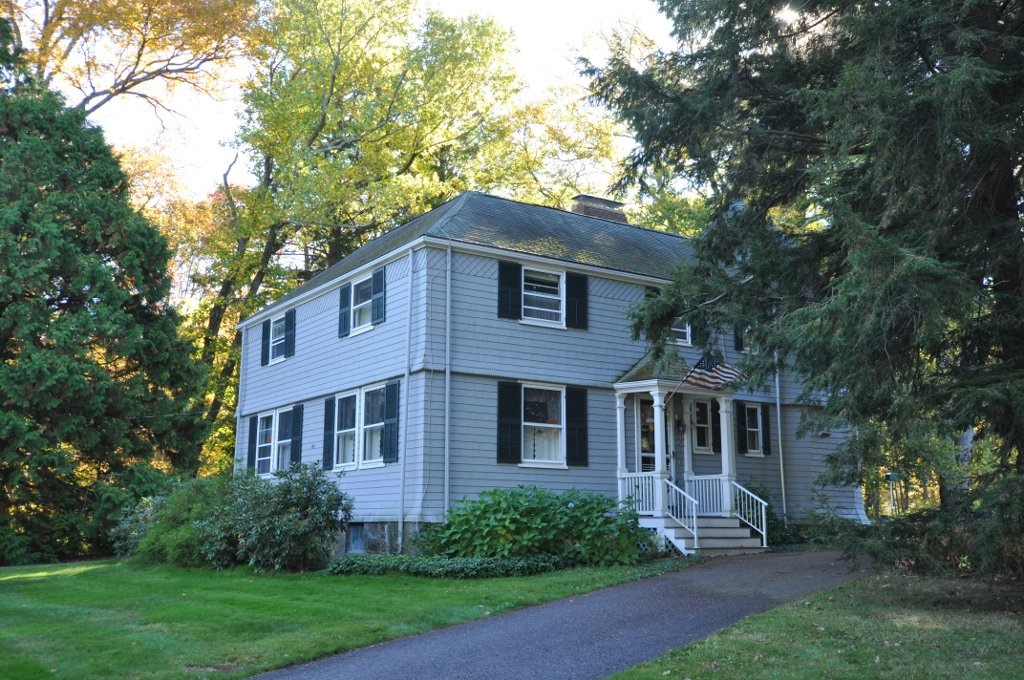
F. L. Ames Gardener's Cottage

== See also ==
- List of National Historic Landmarks in Massachusetts
- National Register of Historic Places listings in Bristol County, Massachusetts
