= North Easton station =

Proposed train station in North Easton, Massachusetts

North Easton
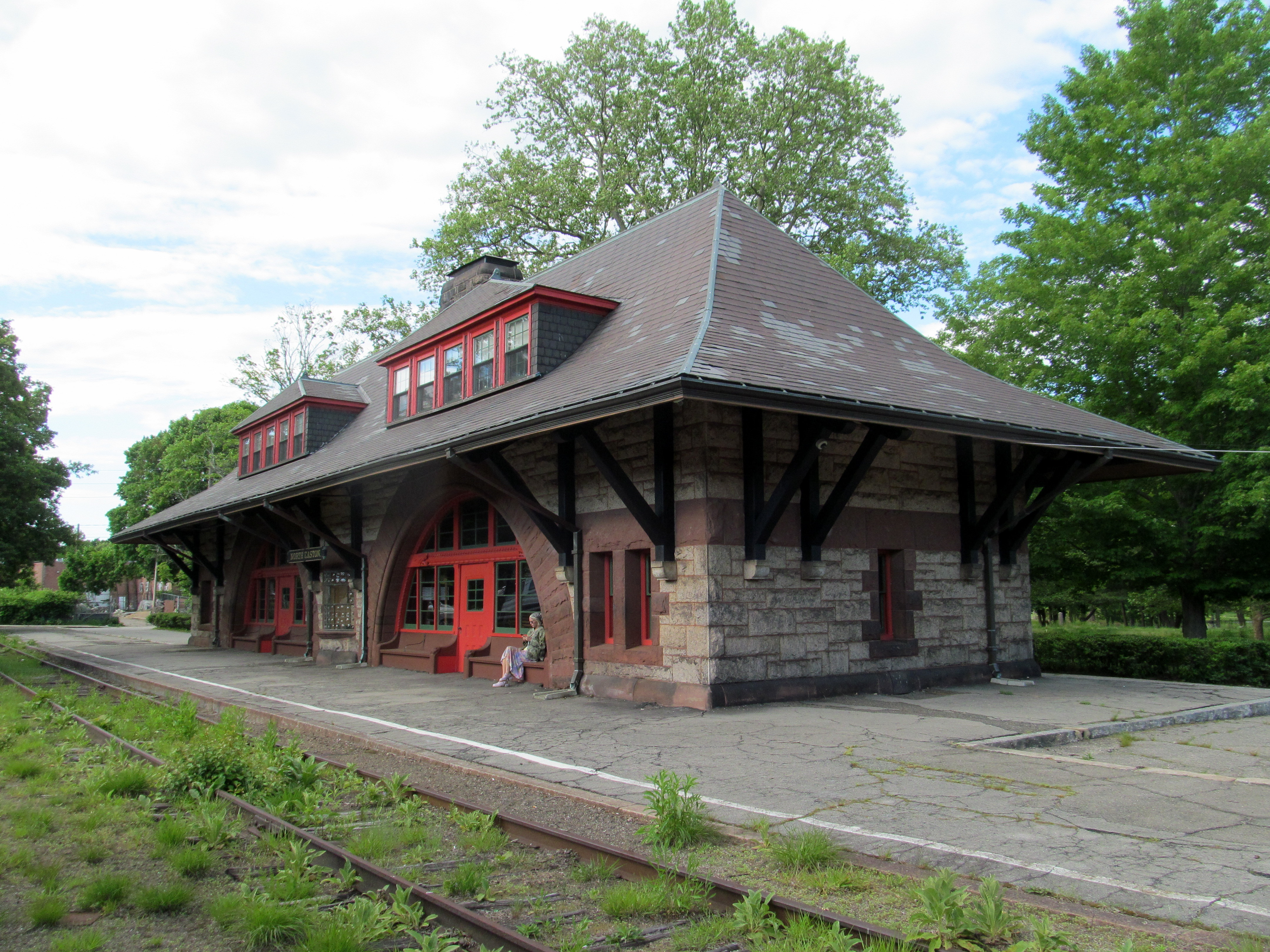
- The former station building in 2017

General information
- Location: 80 Mechanic Street; North Easton, Easton, Massachusetts
- Coordinates: 42°4′9.37″N 71°6′11.95″W
- Owner: Easton Historical Society
- Line: Dighton and Somerset Railroad
- Tracks: 1

History
- Opened: May 16, 1855
- Closed: September 5, 1958
- Rebuilt: 1881
Former services
Preceding station	New York, New Haven and Hartford Railroad	Following station
Stoughton toward Boston	Boston–New Bedford	Easton toward New Bedford
Stoughton toward Boston	Boston–Fall River	Easton toward Fall River
South Stoughton toward Boston	Boston–Fall River via Randolph	Easton toward Fall River
Proposed services
Preceding station	MBTA	Following station
Raynham Place toward Battleship Cove or New Bedford	South Coast Rail Phase 2	North Easton toward South Station
- North Easton Railroad Station
- U.S. National Historic Landmark District – Contributing property
- U.S. Historic district – Contributing property
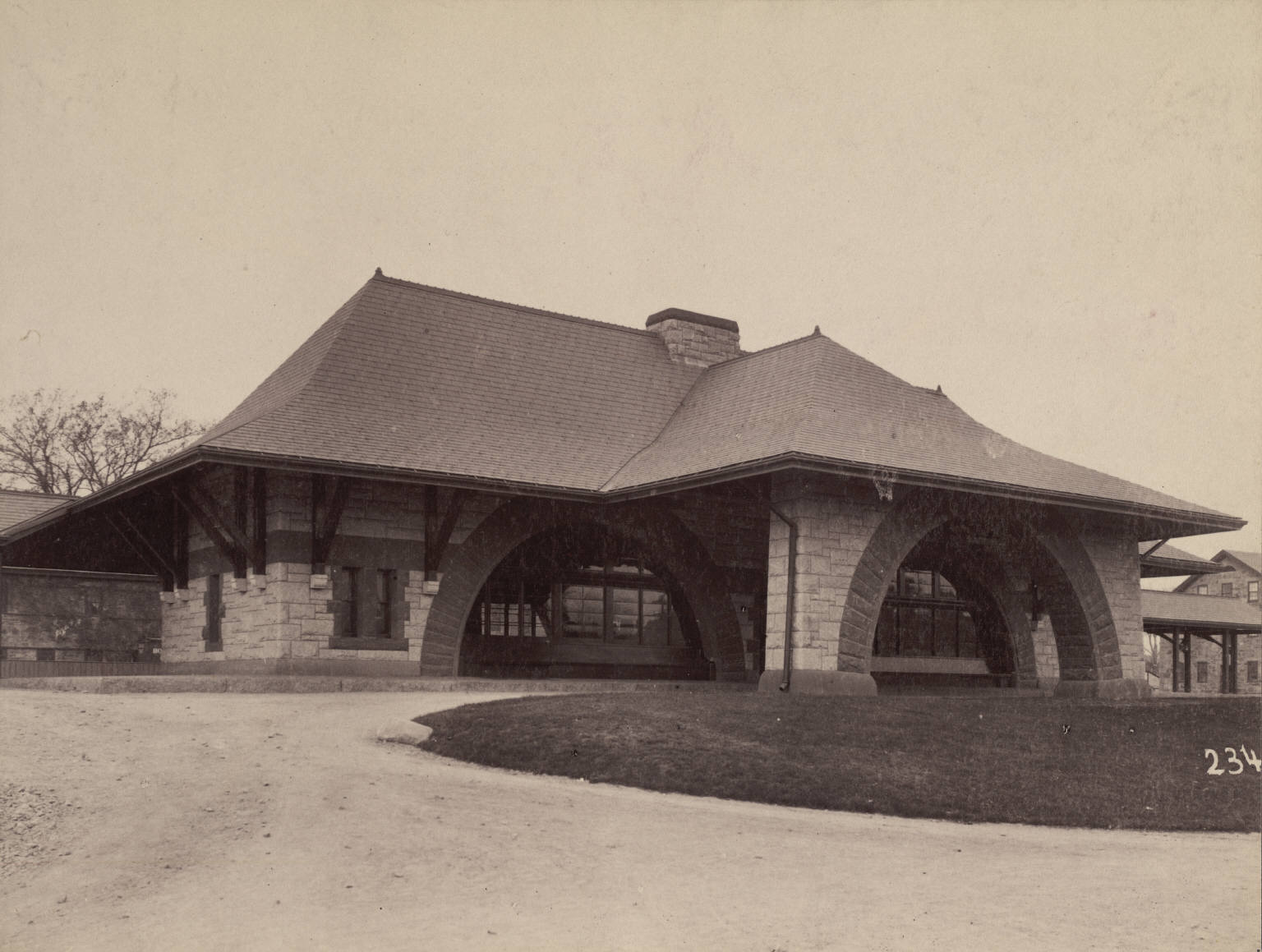
- North Easton station in 1890
- Interactive map of North Easton Railroad Station
- Built: 1881
- Architect: H. H. Richardson
- Part of: H. H. Richardson Historic District of North Easton (ID87002598)

Significant dates
- Designated NHLDCP: December 23, 1987
- Designated CP: November 3, 1972
Location

North Easton station is a former railroad station designed by noted American architect H. H. Richardson. It is located just off Oliver Street in North Easton, Massachusetts, and currently houses the Easton Historical Society. The station was built in 1881 and served commuter trains until 1958. It was added to the National Register of Historic Places in 1972 as Old Colony Railroad Station. In 1987, it also became part of the H. H. Richardson Historic District of North Easton, a National Historic Landmark District. Restoration of passenger rail services to the site have been proposed as part of Phase 2 of the South Coast Rail project.

== History ==
The Easton Branch Railroad opened from Stoughton to North Easton on May 16, 1855. Originally part of the Boston and Providence Railroad, it became part of the Dighton and Somerset Railroad in 1866.

A new station was commissioned in 1881 by Frederick Lothrop Ames, director of the Old Colony Railroad, during the same year that Richardson designed the Ames Gate Lodge for his nearby estate. Frederick Law Olmsted landscaped its grounds. It is a relatively small station, a single story in height with Richardson's characteristic heavy masonry and outsized roof. Its long axis runs north-south with the tracks, now disused, along its west side. The building is laid out symmetrically within, with a large passenger room at each end (one for women, the other for men).

The station's facade is constructed of rough-faced, random ashlar of gray granite with a brownstone belt course and trim. Two large, semicircular arches punctuate each of the long facades, inset with windows and doorways, and ornamented with carvings of a beast's snarling head; a further semicircular arch projects to form the east facade's porte-cochere. Eaves project deeply over all sides, supported by plain wooden brackets.

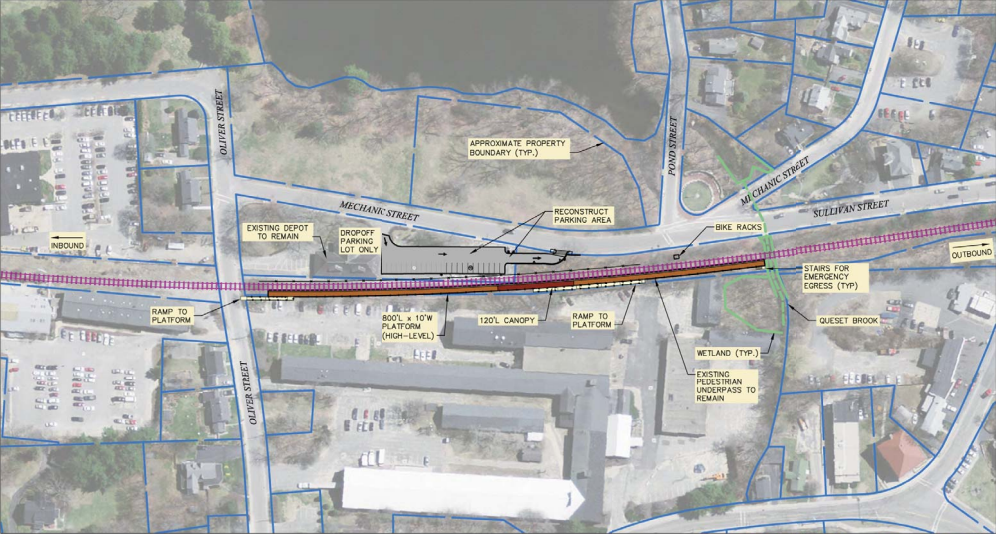
Layout of Easton Village station as proposed in the 2013 Final Environmental Impact Statement

Commuter rail service past Stoughton was cut on September 5, 1958. In 1969, the Ames family purchased the property from the Penn Central Railroad and gave it to the historical society. It was added to the National Register of Historic Places in 1972. In 1987, it also became part of the H. H. Richardson Historic District of North Easton, a National Historic Landmark District.

A new MBTA Commuter Rail station, Easton Village, was proposed to be built at the site as part of full-build (Phase 2) plans for the South Coast Rail project. Preliminary designs from 2014 include a 800-foot-long (240 m) high-level platform across the track from the historic building.

== See also ==
- Ames Shovel Shop
- H. H. Richardson Historic District of North Easton
- North Easton Historic District
- National Register of Historic Places listings in Bristol County, Massachusetts
- List of Old Colony Railroad stations
