= Ames Gate Lodge =

- U.S. National Historic Landmark District – Contributing property
- U.S. Historic district – Contributing property
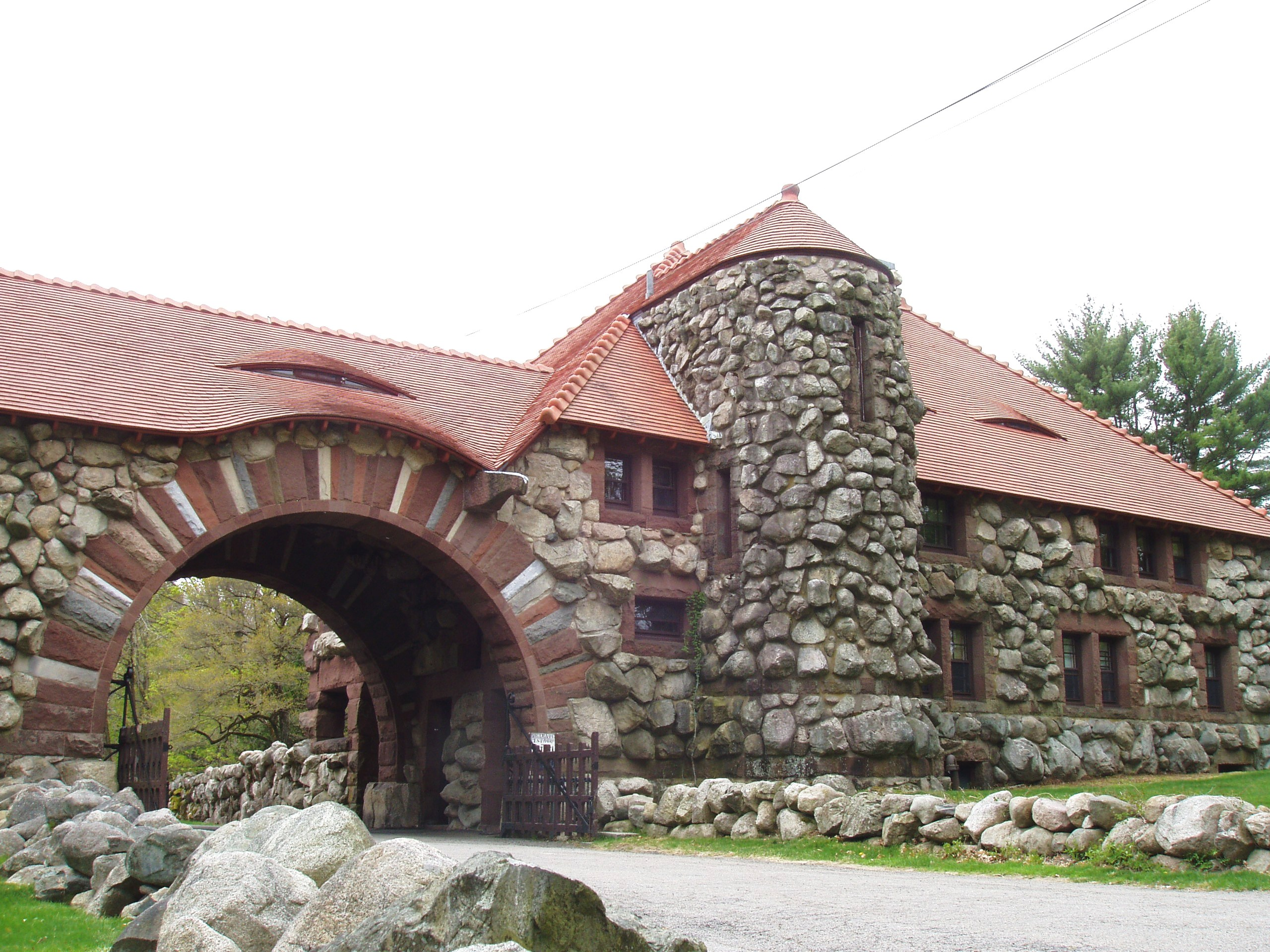
- Location: Easton, Massachusetts
- Coordinates: 42°4′25″N 71°5′43″W
- Built: 1880-1881
- Architect: Henry Hobson Richardson
- Architectural style: Richardsonian Romanesque
- Part of: H. H. Richardson Historic District of North Easton (ID87002598)

Significant dates
- Designated NHLDCP: December 23, 1987
- Designated CP: November 3, 1972

The Ames Gate Lodge is a celebrated work by American architect Henry Hobson Richardson. It is privately owned on an estate landscaped by Frederick Law Olmsted, but its north facade can be seen from the road at 135 Elm Street, North Easton, Massachusetts. In 2013, the Ames Gate Lodge was protected by a preservation easement held by Historic New England.

The lodge was designed and constructed in 1880-1881 for Frederick Lothrop Ames, son of railway magnate Oliver Ames Jr., as the northern entrance to his Langwater estate. Although Langwater dated from 1859 with 1876 additions, its northern regions had until then remained unfinished. Ames thus engaged Richardson and Olmsted in collaboration on its creation. Olmsted's landscape designs were implemented in 1886–1887.

The Gate Lodge is a remarkable synthesis of oversize stone wall, arched gate, and gatehouse building, perhaps based in part on Richardson's appreciation of the Central Park bridges designed by Calvert Vaux. It forms a long, low mass lying directly athwart the estate's entry road, which runs southward within its dominating, semicircular arch. The massive walls appear to be crude heaps of rounded boulders from the estate soil -- "cyclopean rubble" in Vincent Scully's memorable phrase—trimmed in Longmeadow brownstone. The blocky, two-story lodge proper stands west of the arch, and originally housed the estate gardener on the lower floor with rooms for bachelor guests above. Across the arch is a long, low wing ending in a circular bay, once used for storing plants through the winter.

The lodge's public (northern) facade is relatively flat and austere; its southern facade, by contrast, is highly shaped with protrusions and a large porch featuring carvings by Augustus Saint-Gaudens. Capping all is the lodge's prominent, hipped, reddish-tiled roof with its eyelid dormers. As Frank Lloyd Wright once wrote, "The presence of a building is in its roof, and what a roof the Ames Gate Lodge has!"

The nearby F. L. Ames Gardener's Cottage (1884–85) was also designed by Richardson, and built some 400 feet (120 m) east of the Gate Lodge when the gardener's family outgrew the lodge. It was later enlarged by Richardson's successors, Shepley, Rutan and Coolidge, and has subsequently been shingled and otherwise modified.

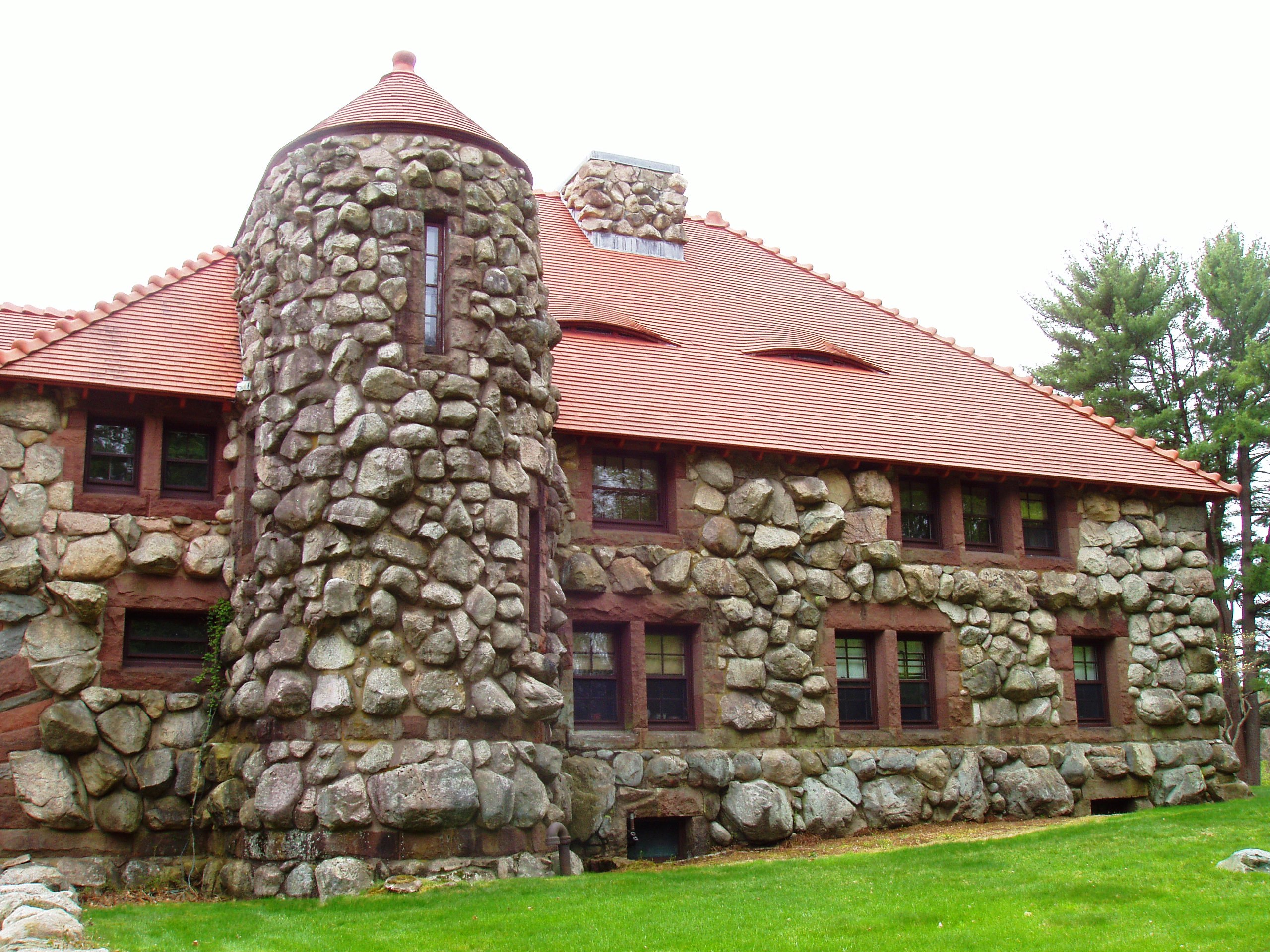
Lodge, seen from road

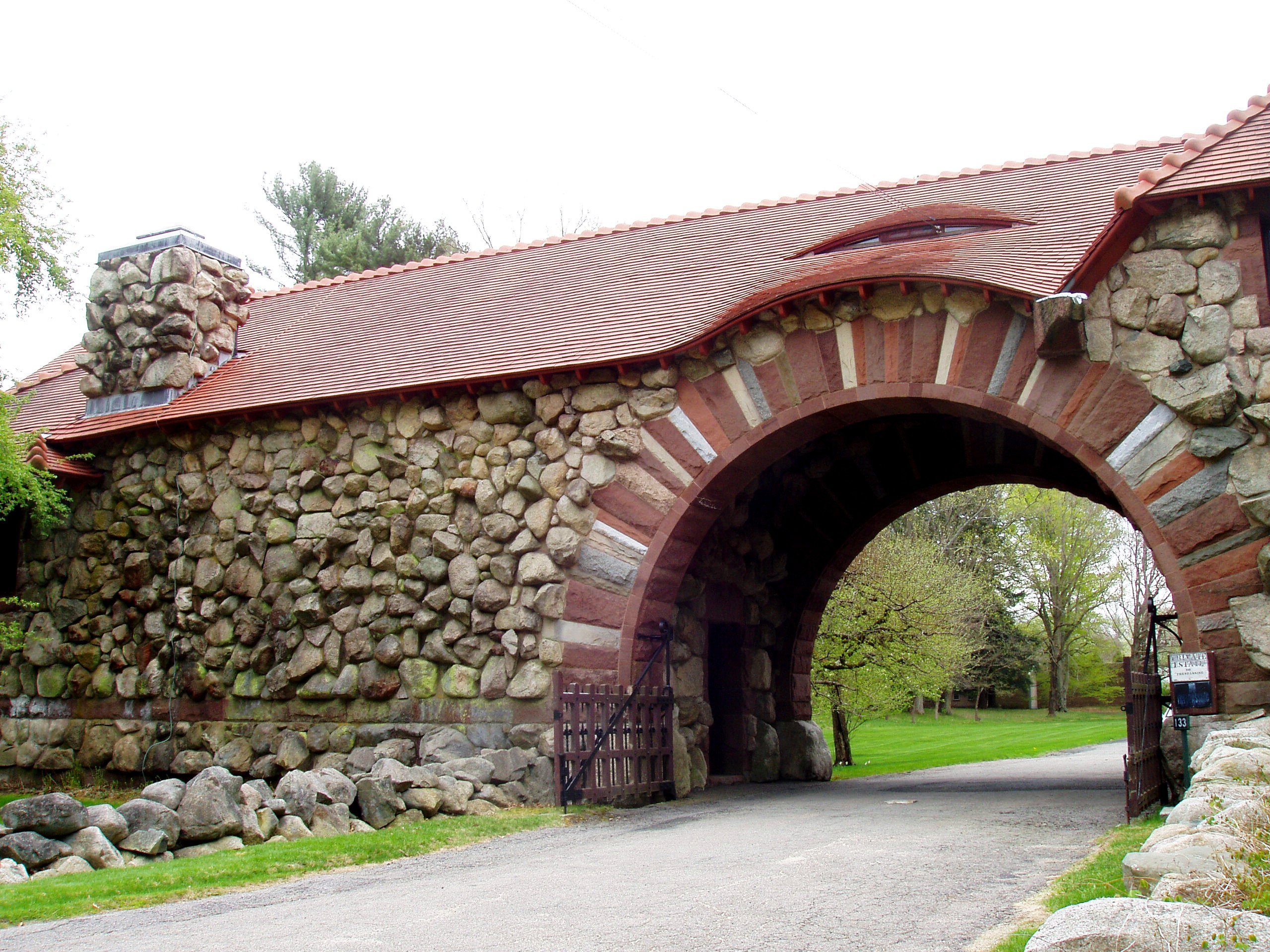
Arch, seen from road

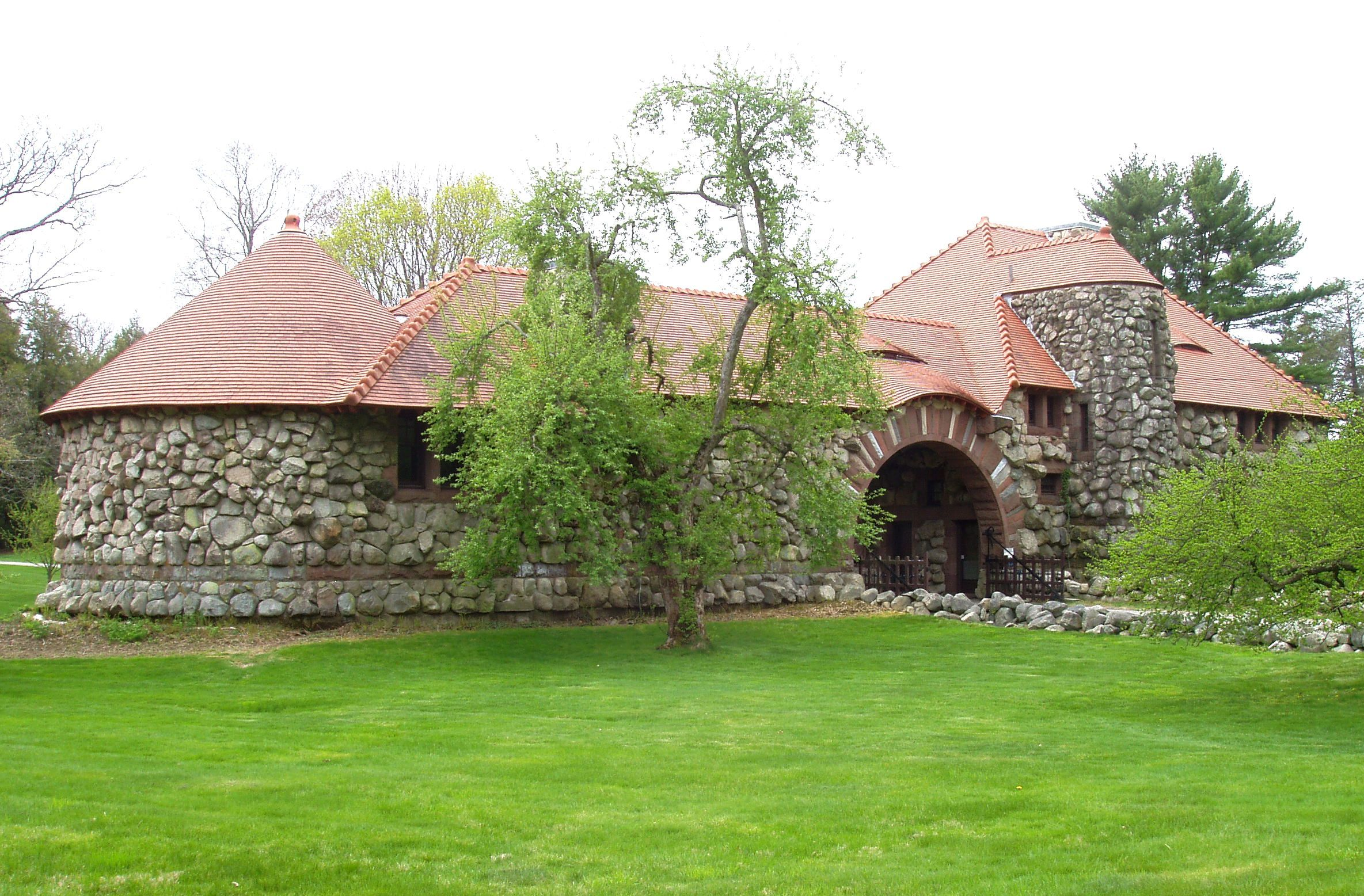
Bay, seen from road

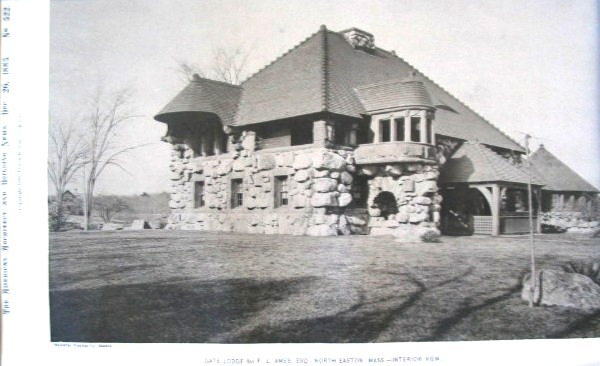
Ames Gate Lodge, from southwest

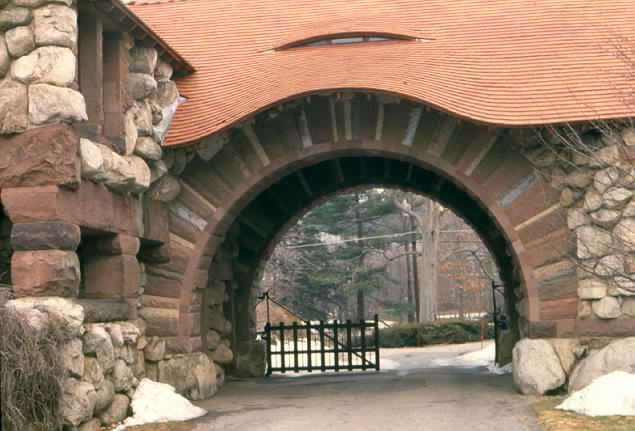
Gateway, south facade

== See also ==
- H. H. Richardson Historic District of North Easton
- North Easton Historic District
- Historic New England
- Frederick Lothrop Ames
