= Ames Free Library =

Library in Easton, Massachusetts

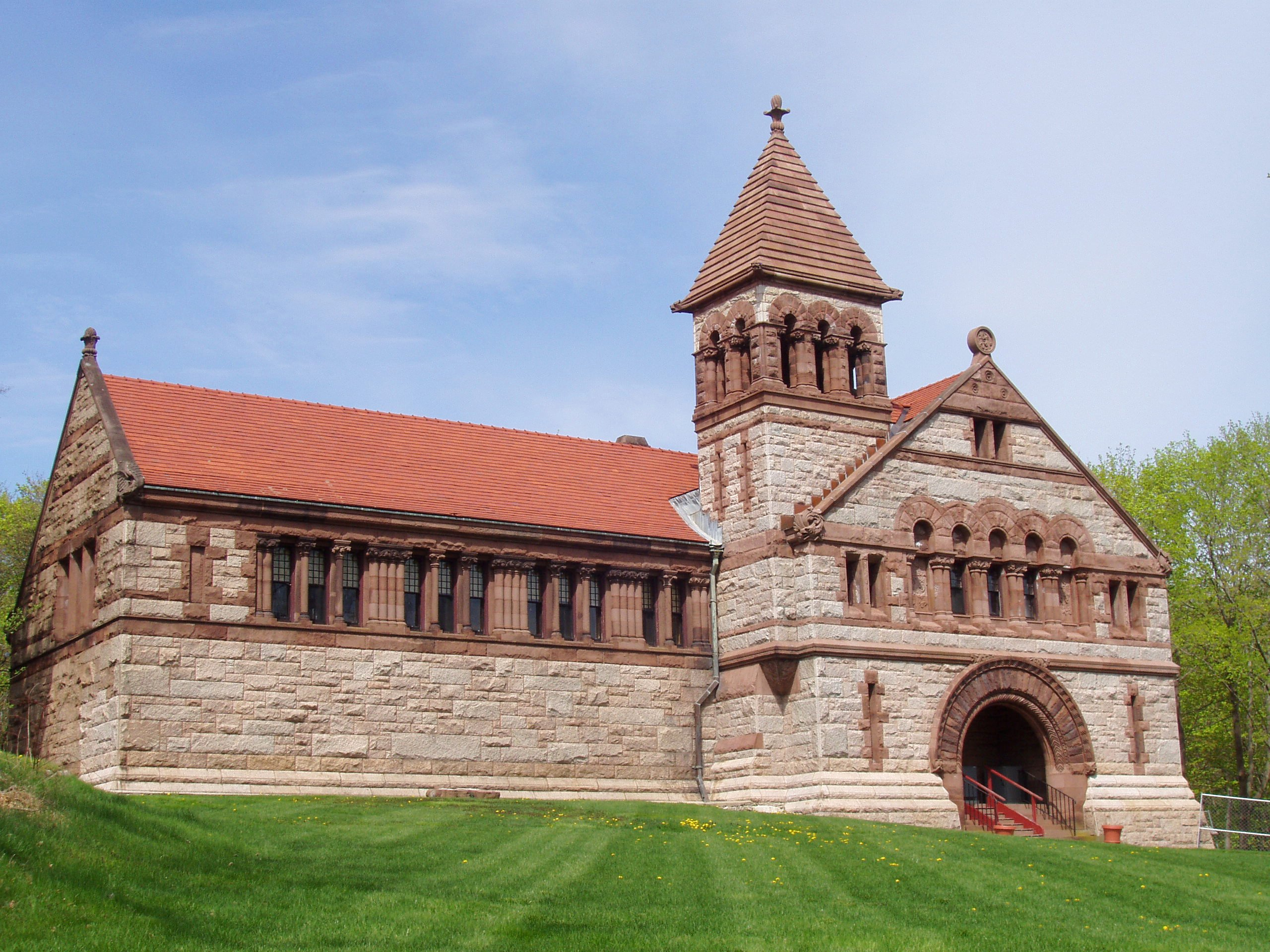
- Established: 1883

Other information
- Director: Ian Dunbar
- Website: AmesFreeLibrary.org
- Ames Free Library
- U.S. National Historic Landmark District – Contributing property
- U.S. Historic district – Contributing property
- Location within Massachusetts Location within the United States
- Location: North Easton, Massachusetts
- Coordinates: 42°4′2″N 71°6′18″W
- Built: 1883
- Architect: Henry Hobson Richardson
- Architectural style: Richardsonian Romanesque
- Part of: H. H. Richardson Historic District of North Easton (ID87002598)

Significant dates
- Designated NHLDCP: December 23, 1987
- Designated CP: November 3, 1972

The Ames Free Library is a public library designed by noted American architect Henry Hobson Richardson. It is located at 53 Main Street, Easton, Massachusetts, immediately adjacent to another Richardson building, Oakes Ames Memorial Hall.

In 2016 the Ames Free Library was a finalist for the Best Small Library in America award from the Library Journal. This award was created in 2005 by the Bill & Melinda Gates Foundation to encourage and showcase outstanding libraries serving populations of fewer than 25,000. This marks the second time the library was a finalist for the award, the first being in 2011.

== History ==
On the death of Oliver Ames Jr., he left $50,000 for the construction of a library. The will stipulated that it was to be a private institution, not owned by the town, but operated in trust for the public. The request was carried out by Ames' children, Frederick Lothrop Ames and Helen Angier Ames. They hired Henry Hobson Richardson to design the building. The final cost of the building came to at least $80,000.

The library was built from 1877 to 1879, although it did not open until March 10, 1883. It is generally rectangular, with broad gable projecting from its north end and a rectangular tower rising where the gable meets the main mass. The gable's front facade contains a heavily arched entry on the first floor and a row of five arched windows separated by pairs of short columns above. The facade is light-brown Milford granite laid in random ashlar with reddish-brown Longmeadow brownstone trim. Its roof is red-orange tile. A children's wing (red brick) was added in 1931, eliminating the original lavatory and document room.

Within, the library's major rooms, stack wing, hall, and reading room are laid out longitudinally. The reading room's fireplace is primarily by Stanford White, and the stone and bronze medallions of Oliver Ames Jr. were designed by Augustus Saint-Gaudens.

== Gallery ==
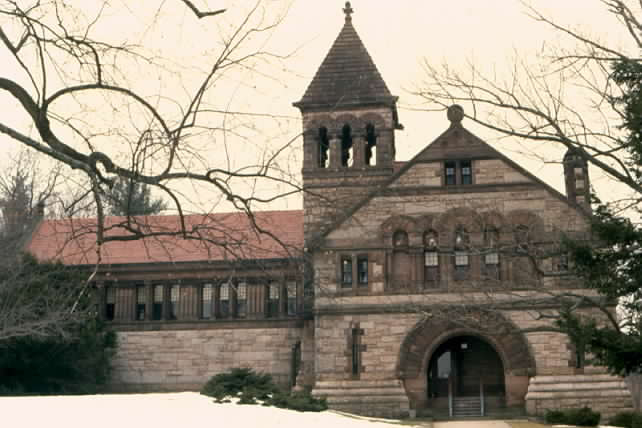
Ames Free Library

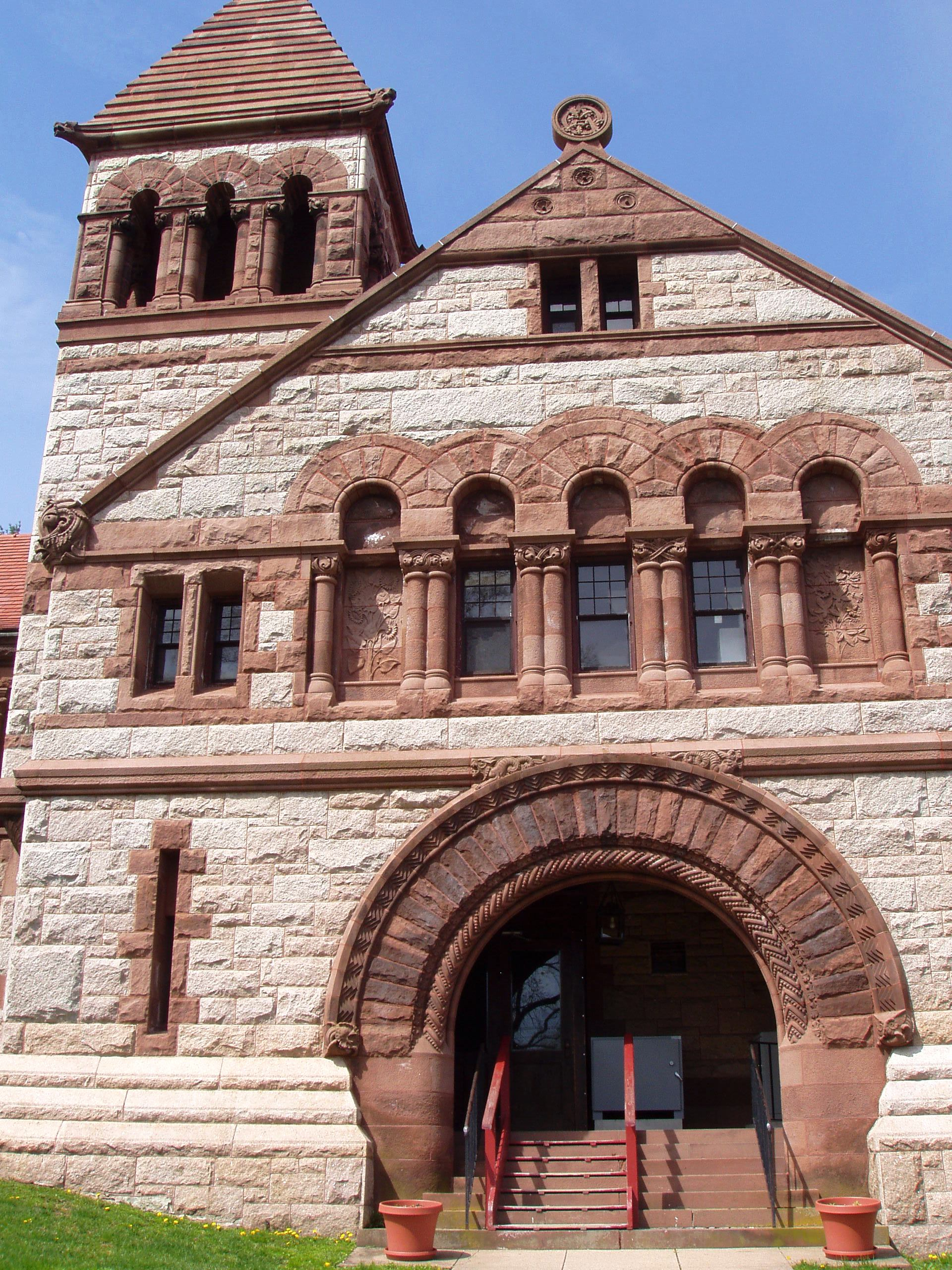
Front facade

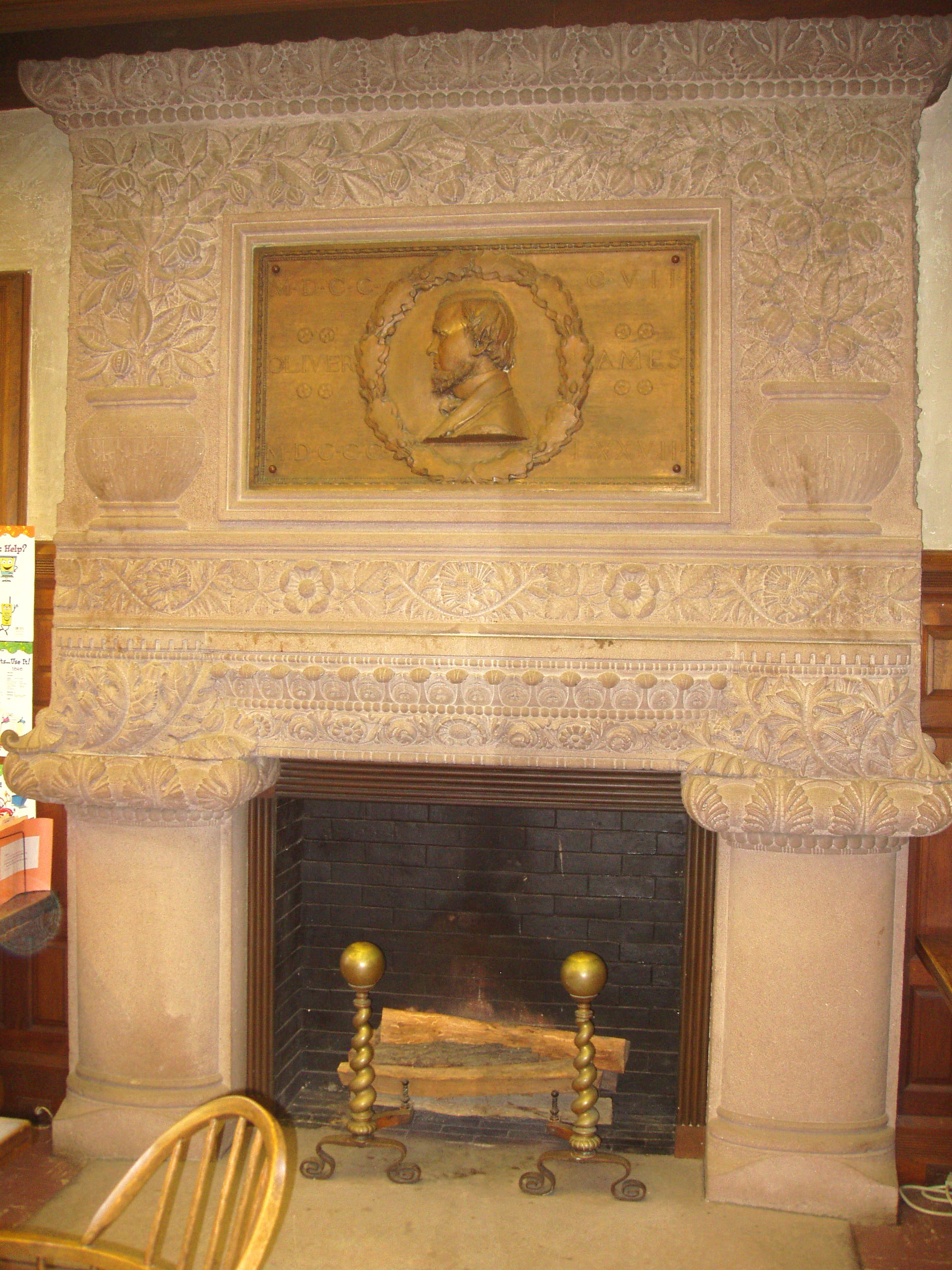
Fireplace

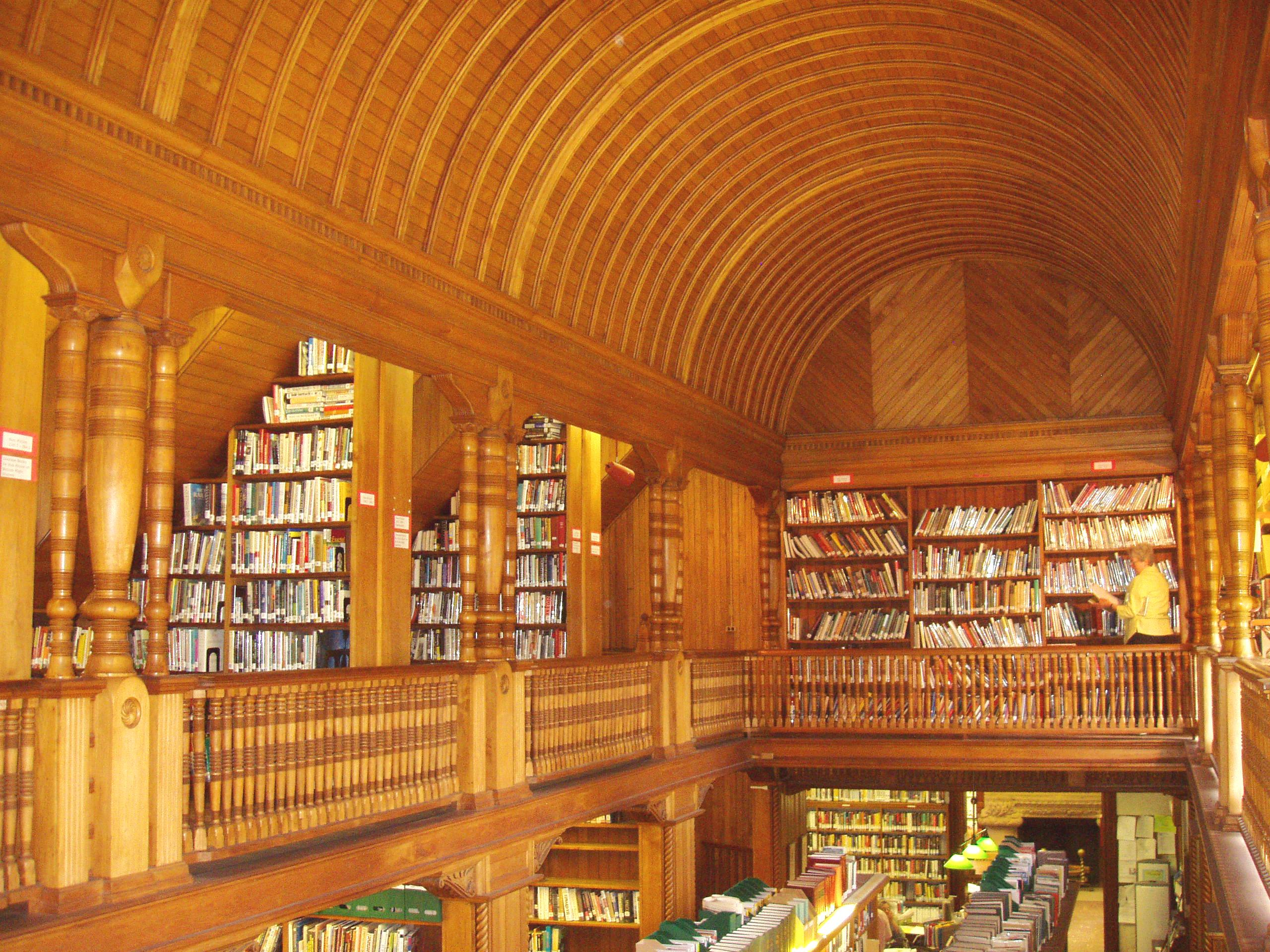
Stacks

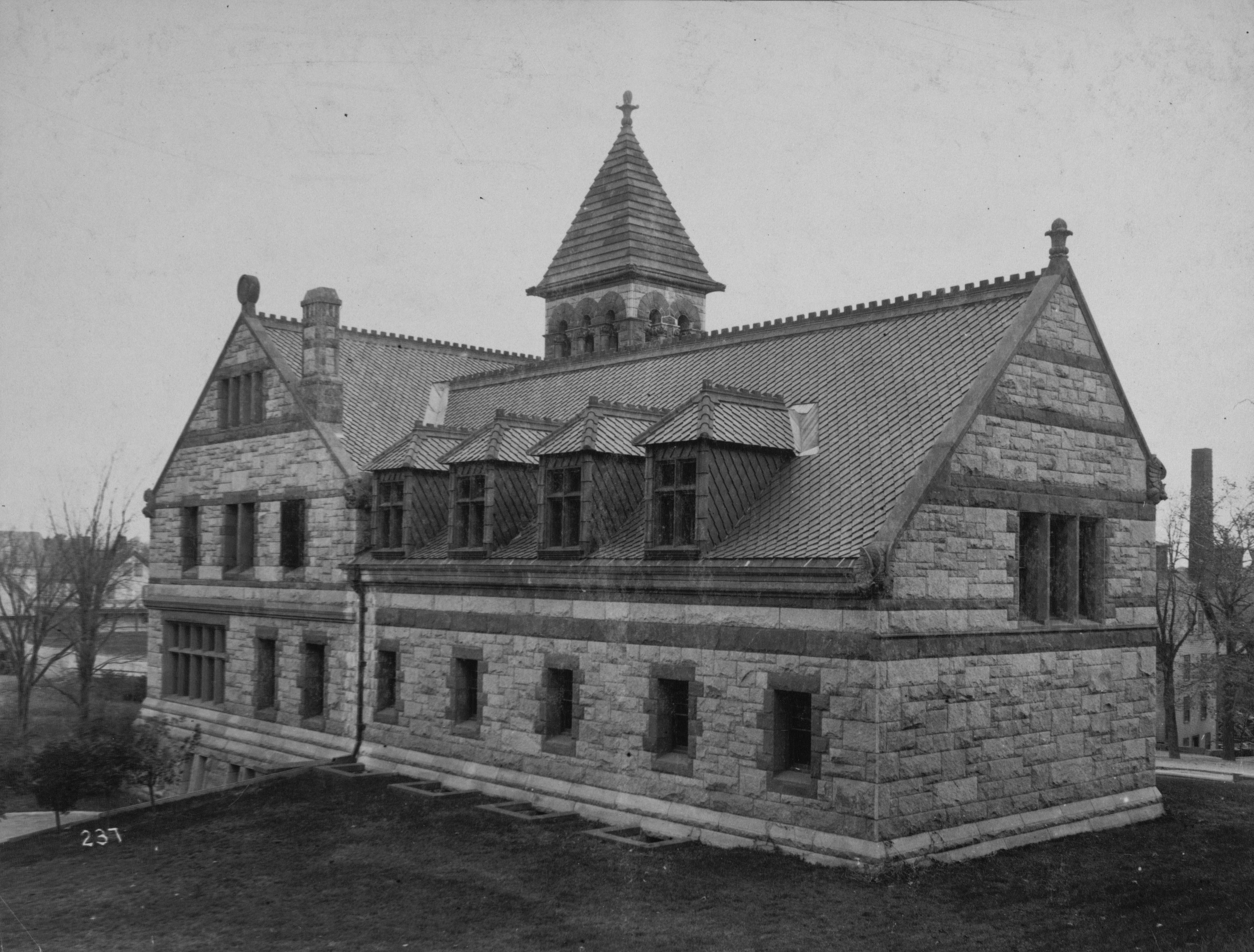
Ames Free Library, ca. 1879-1895

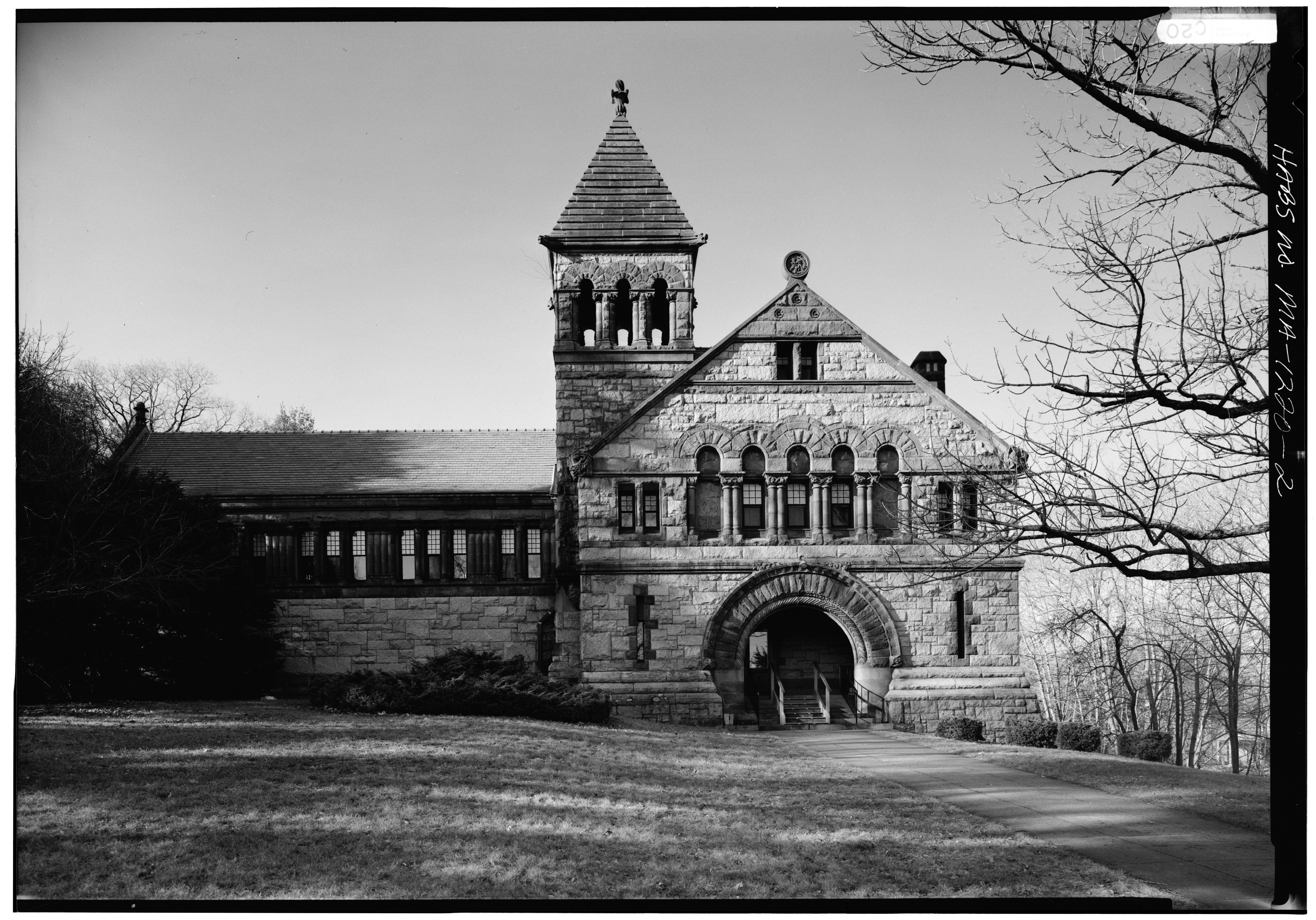

== See also ==
- H. H. Richardson Historic District of North Easton
- North Easton Historic District
