= The Rockery =

War memorial in Easton, Massachusetts

Coordinates: 42°3′58.7″N 71°6′14.8″W

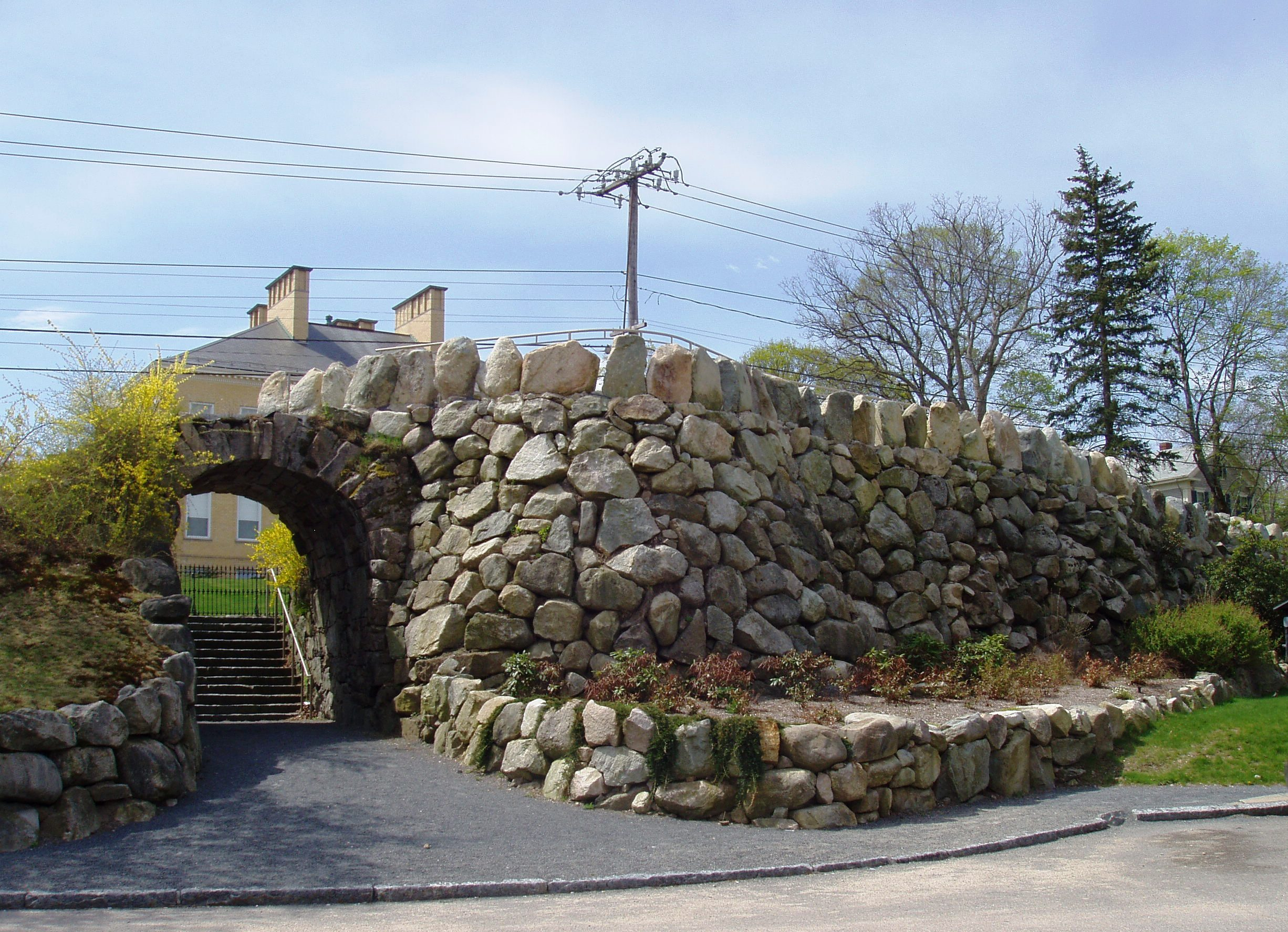
The Rockery

The Rockery, also known as the Memorial Cairn, is an unusual war memorial designed by the noted American landscaper Frederick Law Olmsted. It is located at the center of North Easton Center in Easton, Massachusetts, where it forms the focal point for two adjacent H. H. Richardson buildings with their own Olmsted landscapes.

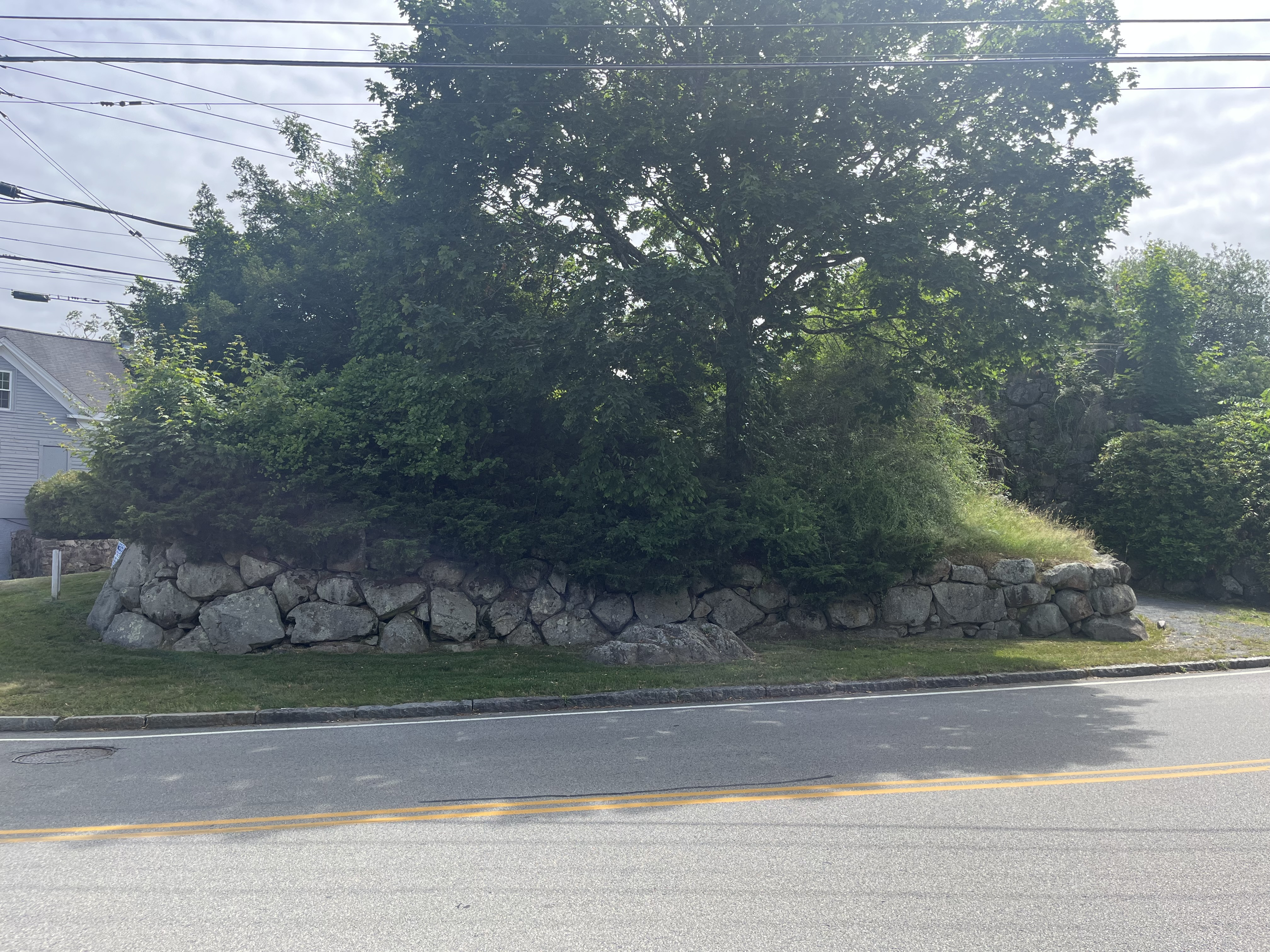
The exterior of the Rockery as seen from Main St.

The Rockery was created in 1882 as a memorial for North Easton's citizens lost in the American Civil War, a public area, and a carriage promenade with views of North Easton. Funded by Oliver Ames & Sons, the monument consists of boulders heaped into a long, asymmetric mound across a rustic archway that echoes those of H. H. Richardson's nearby Oakes Ames Memorial Hall.

In April 1882 Olmsted wrote to Oakes Angier Ames that such cairns were of monuments "the oldest and most enduring in the world", and with "the beautiful plants that have become rooted in them and which spring out of their crannies or have grown over them. . . are far more interesting and pleasant to see than the greater number of those constructed of massive masonry and elaborate sculpture." He further explained that plants growing across the rocky buttress would symbolize peace taming war.

Over the years, boulders loosened and toppled away, stairways crumbled, and the gardens filled with weeds. At one point, the Rockery was lowered from its original height of 25 feet and utility poles installed on its eastern tip. In recent years, however, the Rockery has been restored and is actively maintained by the town of Easton.
