= Oakes Ames Memorial Hall =

- U.S. National Historic Landmark District – Contributing property
- U.S. Historic district – Contributing property
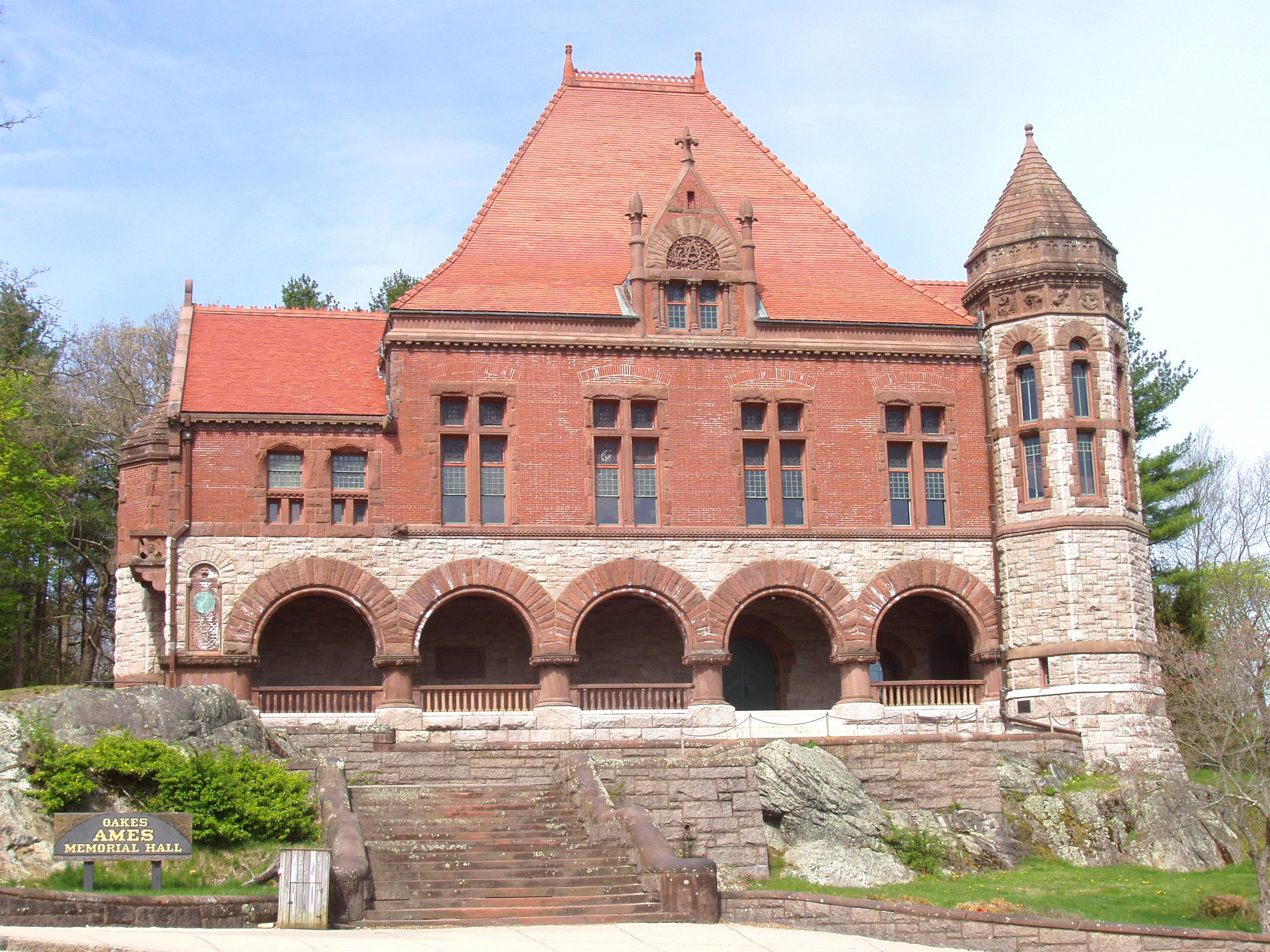
- Location: Easton, Massachusetts
- Coordinates: 42°4′2″N 71°6′18″W
- Built: 1879-1881
- Architect: Henry Hobson Richardson
- Architectural style: Richardsonian Romanesque
- Part of: H. H. Richardson Historic District of North Easton (ID87002598)

Significant dates
- Designated NHLDCP: December 23, 1987
- Designated CP: November 3, 1972

Oakes Ames Memorial Hall is a historic hall designed by noted American architect H. H. Richardson, with landscaping by Frederick Law Olmsted. It is located on Main Street in the village of North Easton in Easton, Massachusetts, immediately adjacent to another Richardson building, Ames Free Library.

== History ==
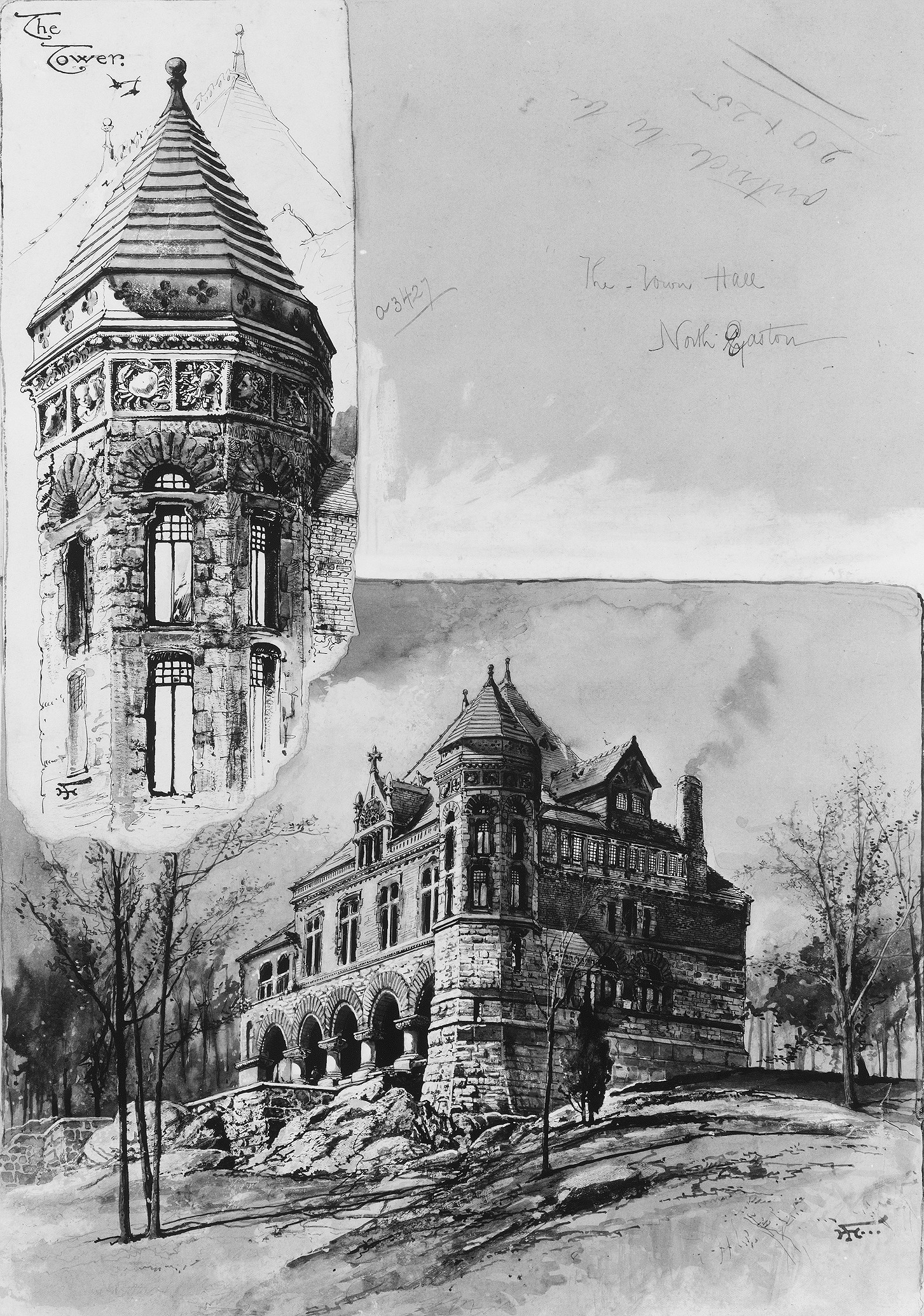
A drawing of the Hall by Harry Fenn, currently in the Metropolitan Museum of Art

The hall was built 1879–81 as a gift to the town from children of Congressman Oakes Ames. It was originally intended for use as a Town Hall but in practice has mainly served as a meeting space for private groups. It was due to dissent amongst different groups in the town at the time that the Oakes Ames Memorial Hall was never used for its intended purpose as the town hall, and to this day the Frothingham House is used for this purpose.

== Features ==
The structure's main facade, altogether 96 feet (29 m) long by 51 feet (16 m) deep, presents an arcade of five massive arches with a row of windows set above and an octagonal tower at its right corner. Its first floor is constructed of native, pinkish-gray North Easton granite with Longmeadown brownstone trim. The second floor is brick, with a north-facing dormer half finished in timber and stucco. The steeply peaked roof above is finished in red tile. The front's third-floor, dormer window is wreathed with sculpted foliage, and displays the initials O. A. and twelve signs of the zodiac.

The main hall inside is on the second floor, and 59 feet (18 m) long by 47 feet (14 m) wide with a 20-foot (6.1 m) height. It contains a stage (26 by 18 feet). This arrangement proved impractical due to inadequate stairway access to the hall. The first floor contains a small meeting room and service rooms; the attic contains a Masonic hall.

== Gallery ==
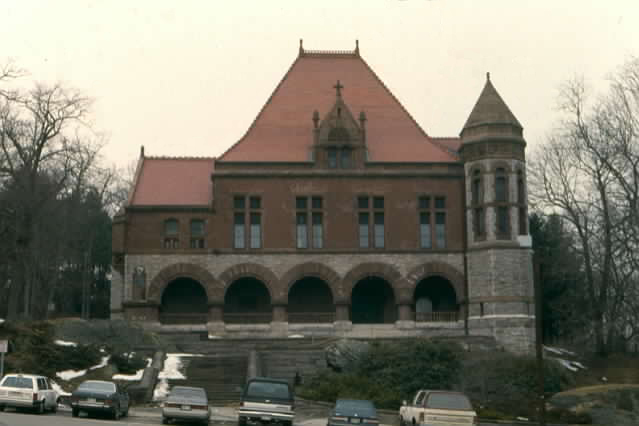
Oakes Ames Memorial Hall

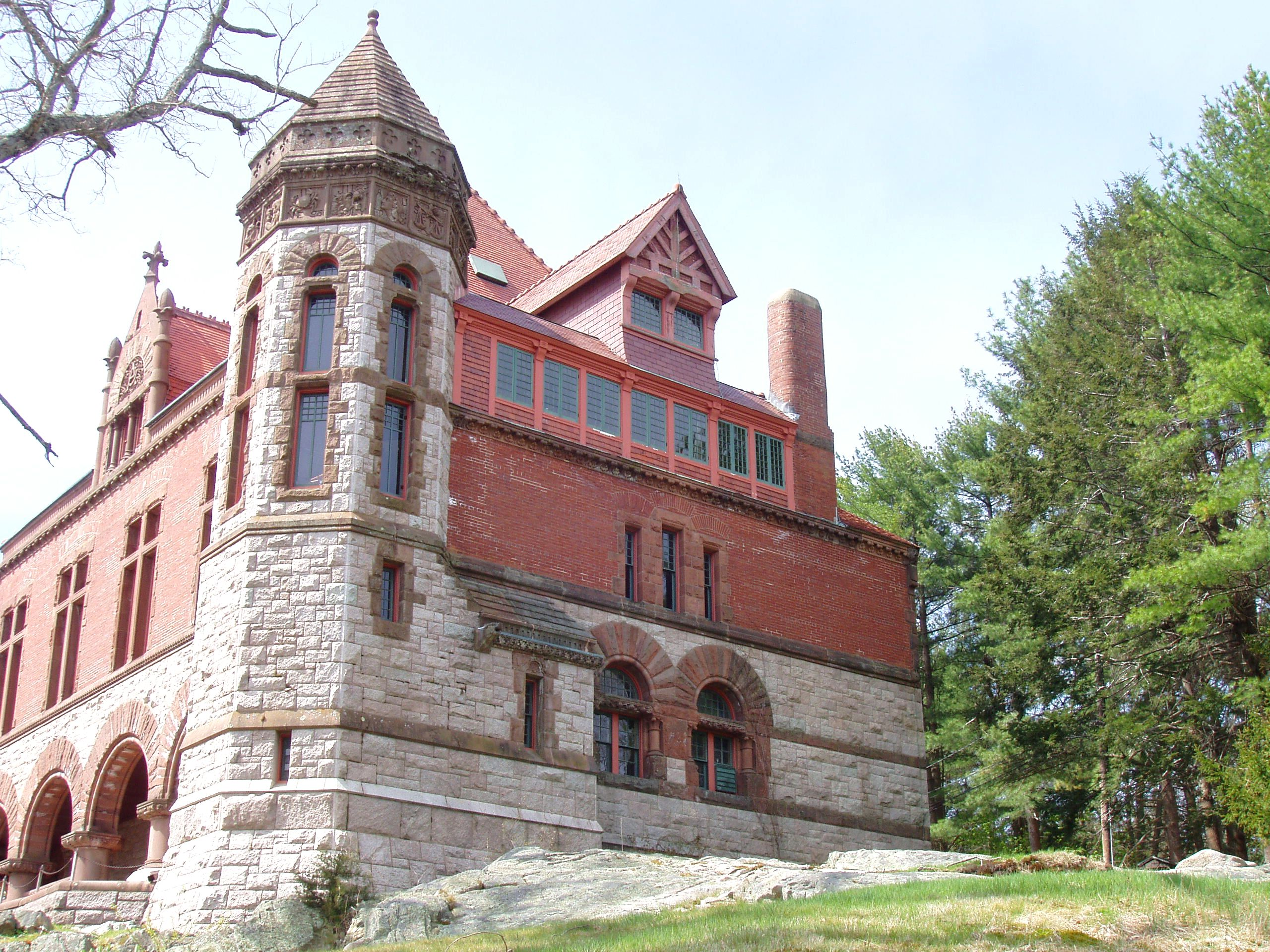
Side view

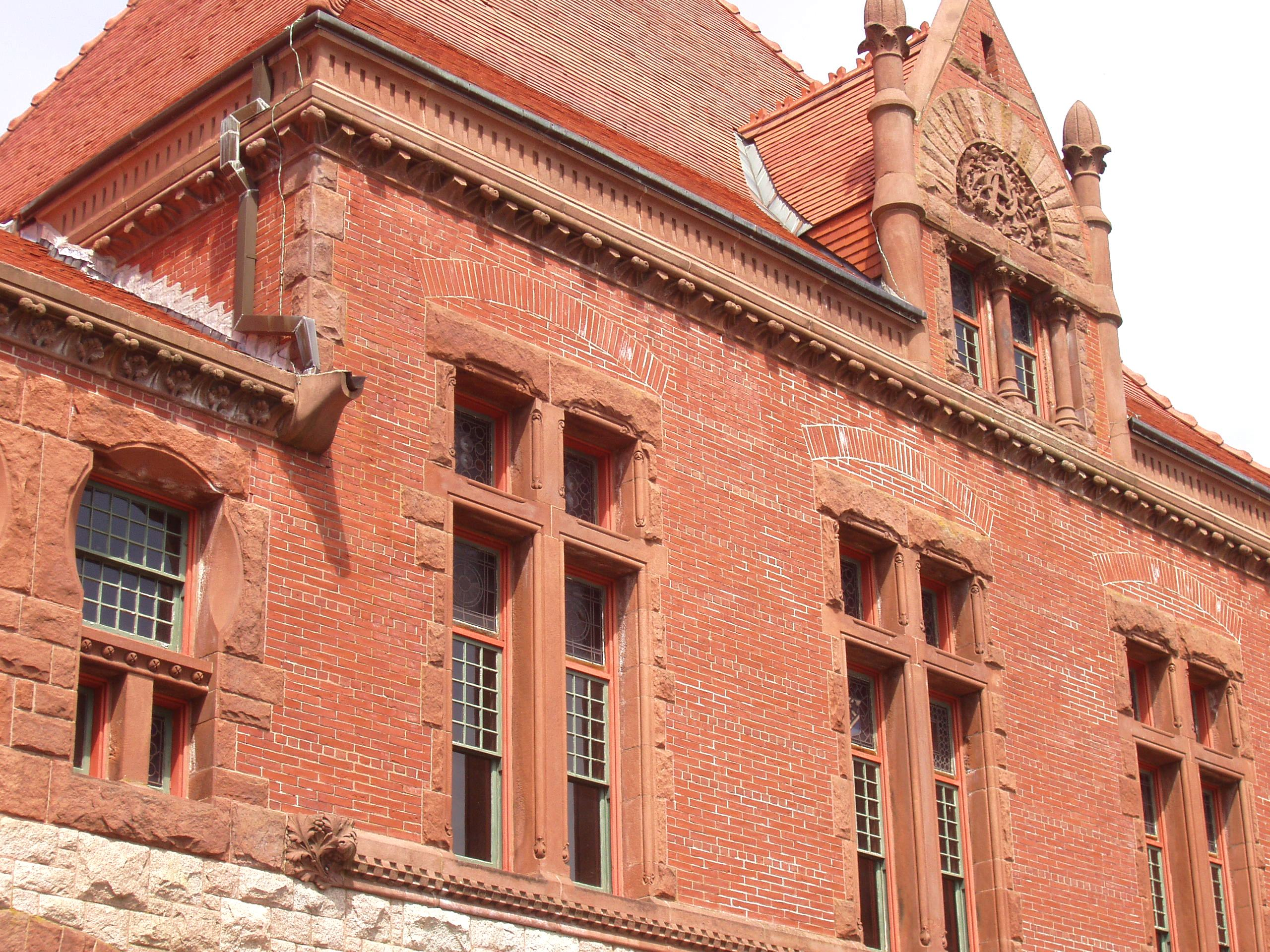
Facade detail

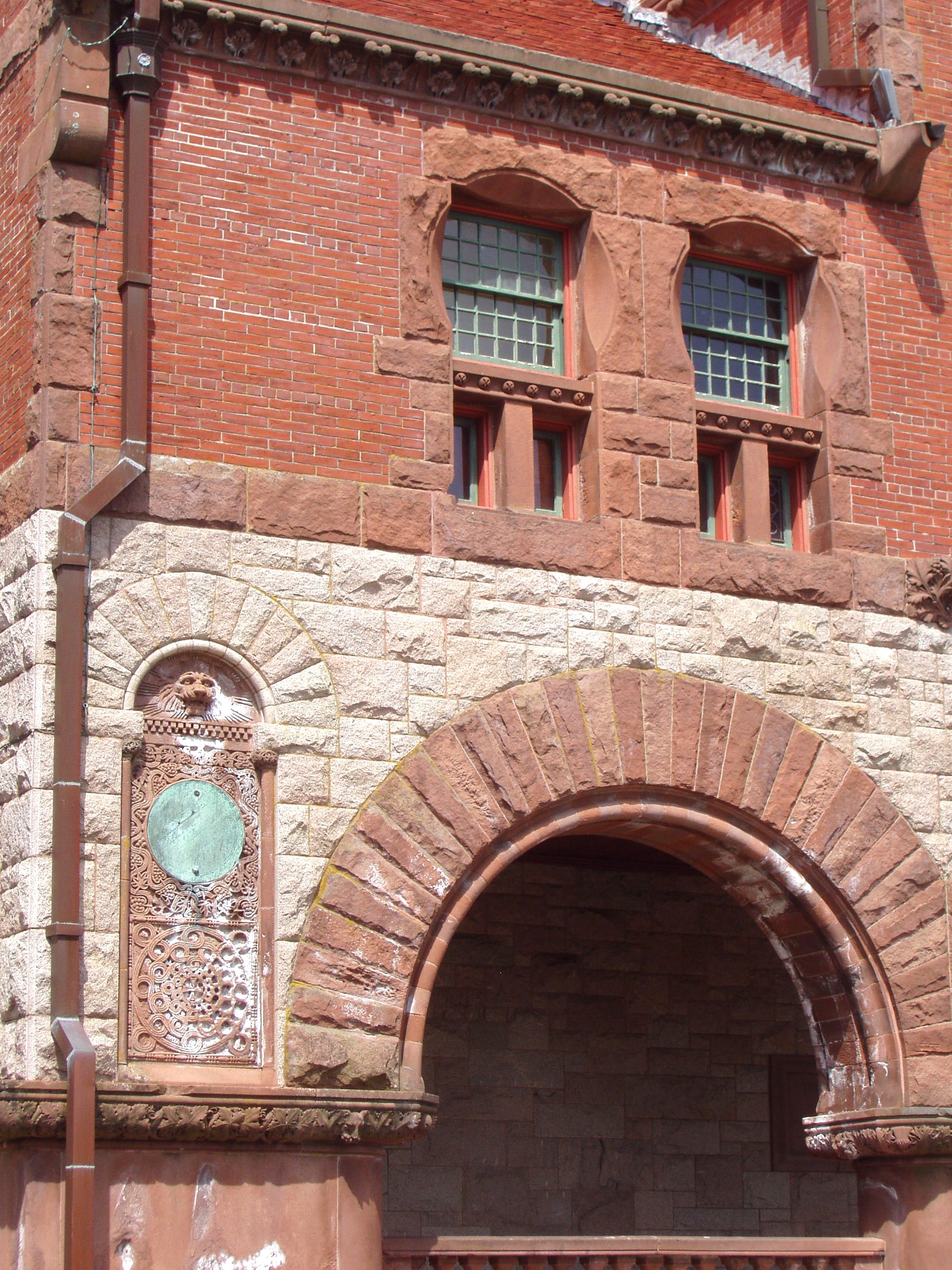
Detail

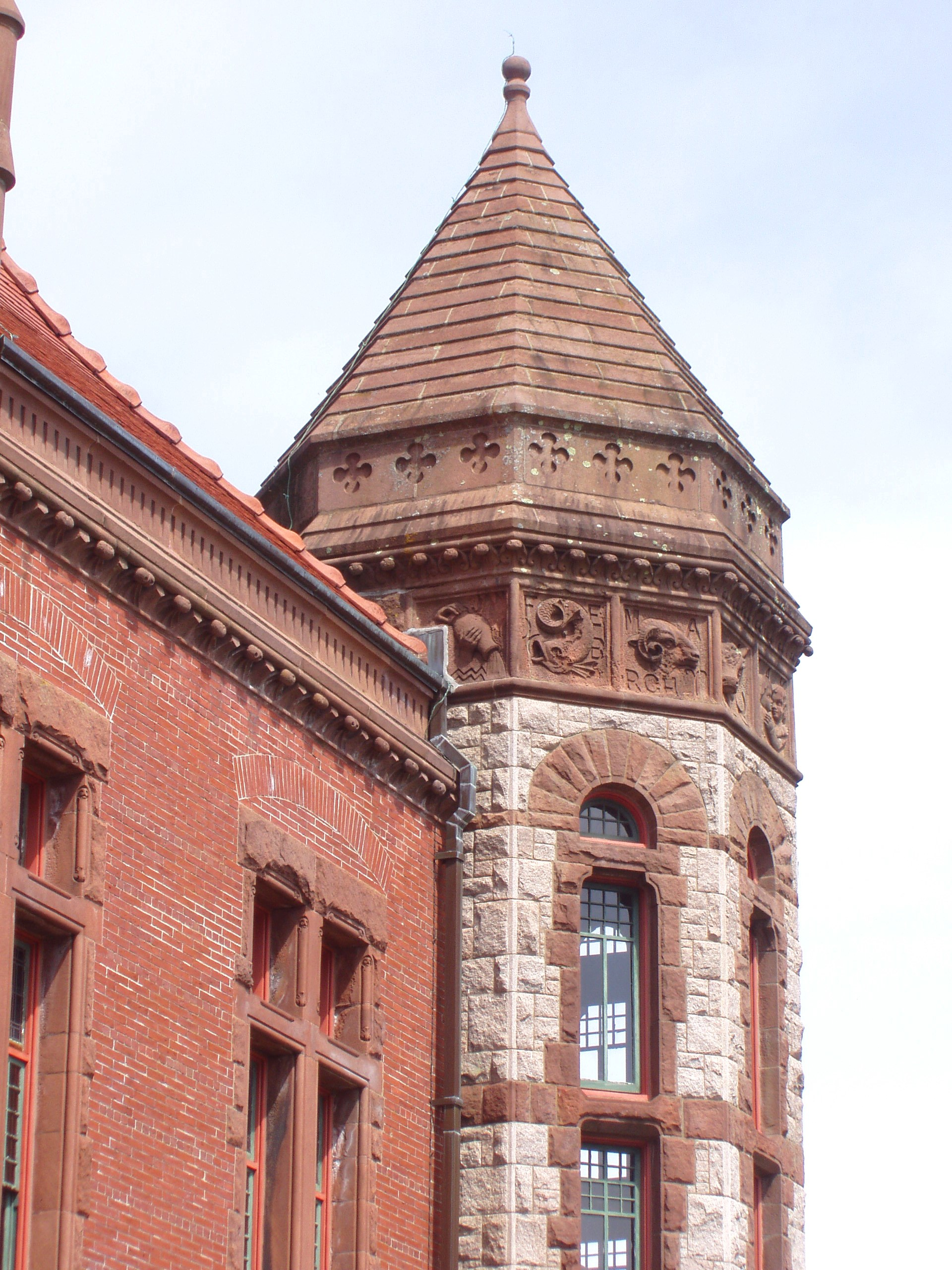
Tower detail

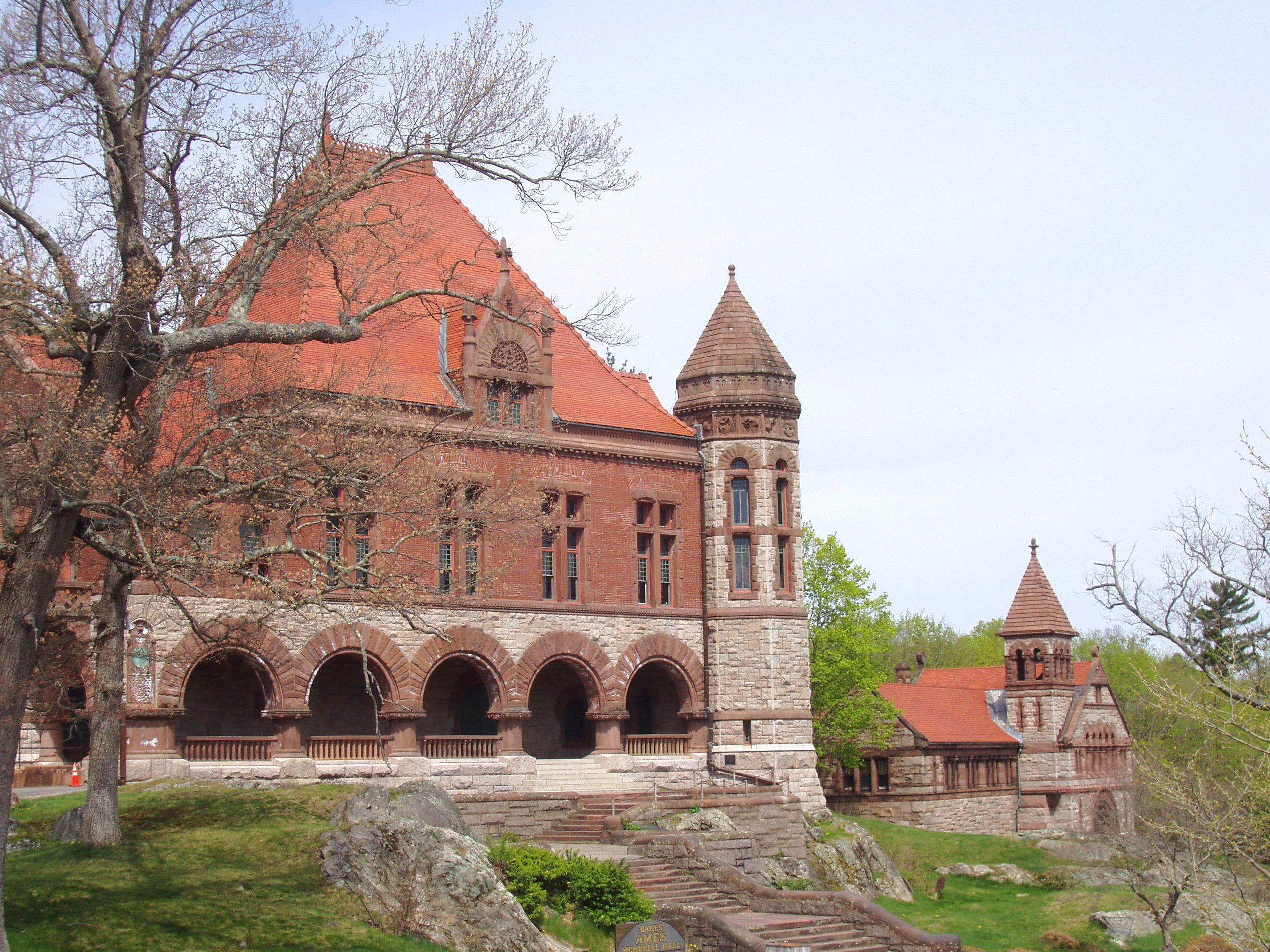
Oakes Ames Memorial Hall with Ames Free Library in background

== See also ==
- H. H. Richardson Historic District of North Easton
- North Easton Historic District
