= Statue of Liberty in popular culture =

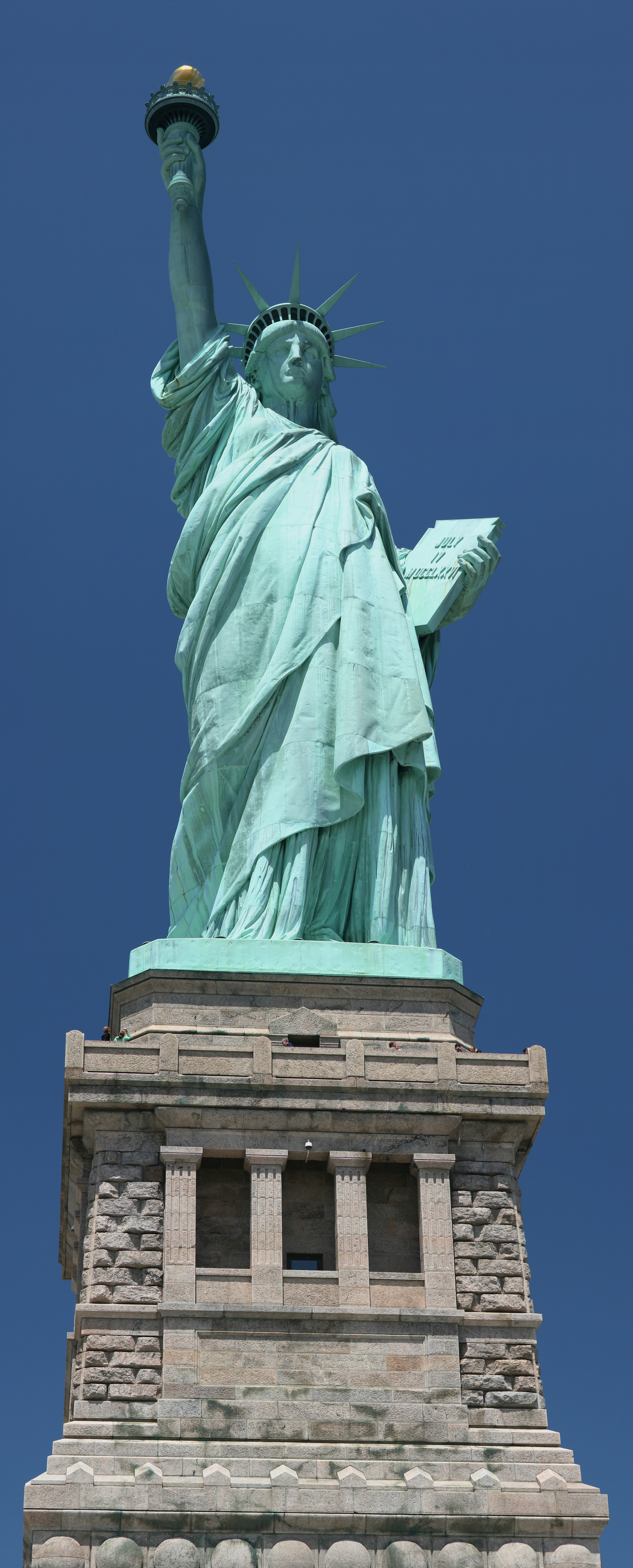
Statue of Liberty Liberty Enlightening the World Frédéric Bartholdi, 1886, Liberty Island, New York Harbor

After its unveiling in 1886, the Statue of Liberty (Liberty Enlightening the World), by Frédéric Auguste Bartholdi, quickly became an iconic symbol of American freedom, and began to be featured on posters, postcards, pictures, and books. The statue's likeness has also appeared on coins, currency, postage stamps, art, in films, television programs, music videos, and video games, and has been used in logos and in theatrical productions. The Statue of Liberty, prominently situated in New York Harbor, is a popular and recognizable local, national, and international icon and political symbol and has often been the first significant item seen by arriving immigrants.

== Symbolism ==
The Statue of Liberty has variously been seen to represent New York City, the United States, and human civilization as a whole. In political cartoons, it often represents the United States or "Freedom". David Glassberg, writing in 2003, identified six different political meanings the statue has been imbued with in different time periods since its 1886 erection: "1) as a monument to political cooperation between France and the United States; 2) as a monument to the end of slavery in America; 3) as a monument to American national unity; 4) as a monument to immigration and economic opportunity; 5) as a monument to political liberty and freedom around the globe; and 6) as a monument to the character and resilience of New York City and its residents." In Glassberg's view, these meanings have largely but not entirely replaced each other successively. John Clute, in The Encyclopedia of Science Fiction, commented that the statue began to be viewed shortly after its unveiling in negative ways in addition to positive ones, with the statue as a whole embodying "Ozymandian pride" and the torch representing a warning rather than merely serving as a beacon.

Depicting an altered form of the statue is a way to convey messages, used by various artists across different types of media. The torch is replaced by a weapon in some literary depictions, including Franz Kafka's posthumously-published 1927 novel Amerika (written c. 1913), where the statue is seen wielding a sword.

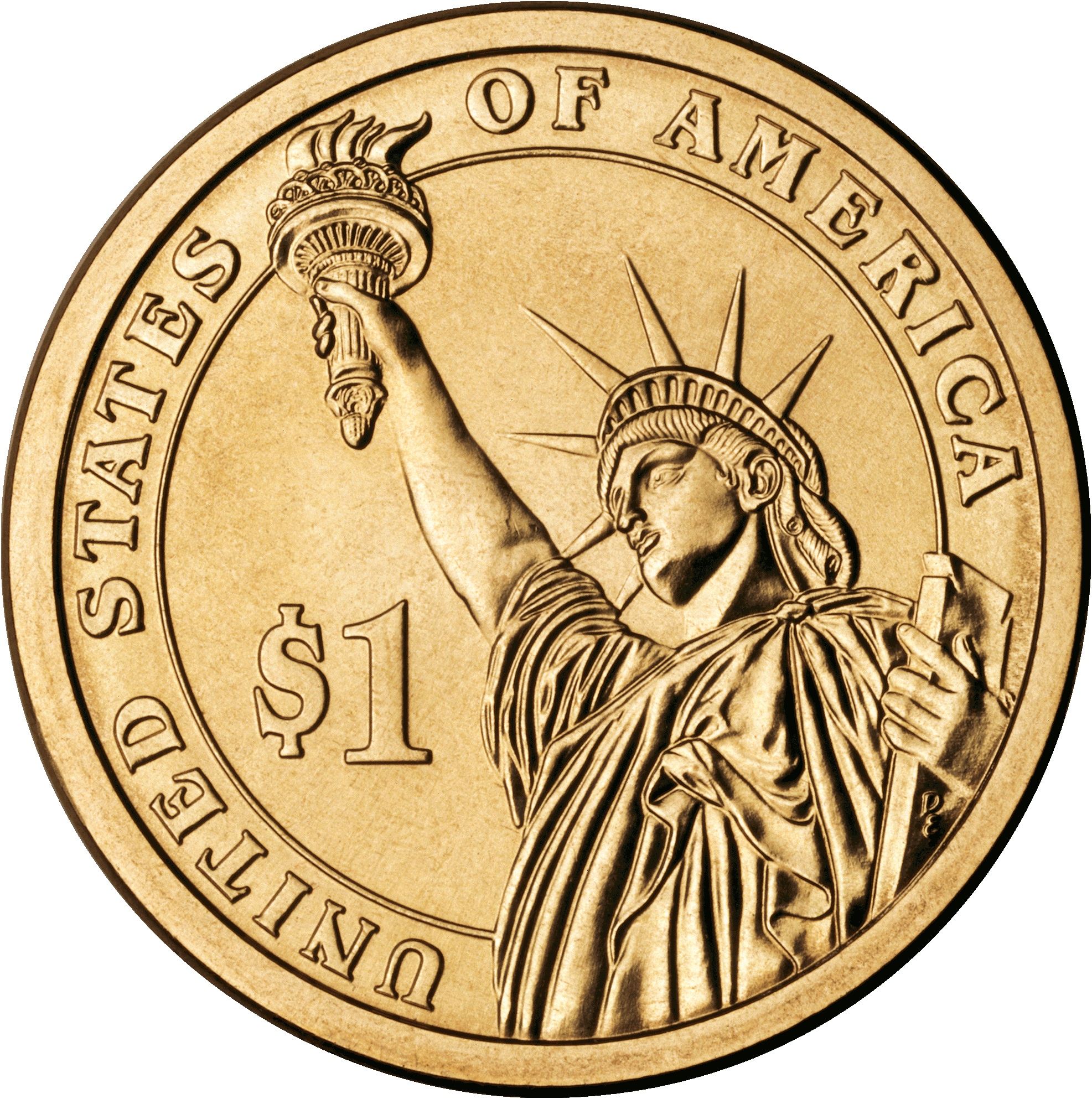
Reverse of a $1 presidential coin

== Currency and stamps ==
The Statue of Liberty has been depicted on various United States coins. currency, and postage stamps. In 1986, the United States Mint released a three-coin series, Statue of Liberty $5 gold coin, a silver dollar and a clad half dollar, for the centennial of the statue. In 2001, the Statue of Liberty was on the reverse side of the New York state quarter in the 50 State Quarters series. Since 2006, the United States ten-dollar bill has featured two portrayals of the Statue of Liberty's torch in red on the obverse. In addition, the statue is on the reverse of all presidential $1 coins issued between 2007 and 2016 and in 2020. It is also on the obverse of the half dollar of the 2026 United States Semiquincentennial coinage; its torch is shown on the reverse. The statue has also been depicted on the bullion American Platinum Eagle and American Palladium Eagle.

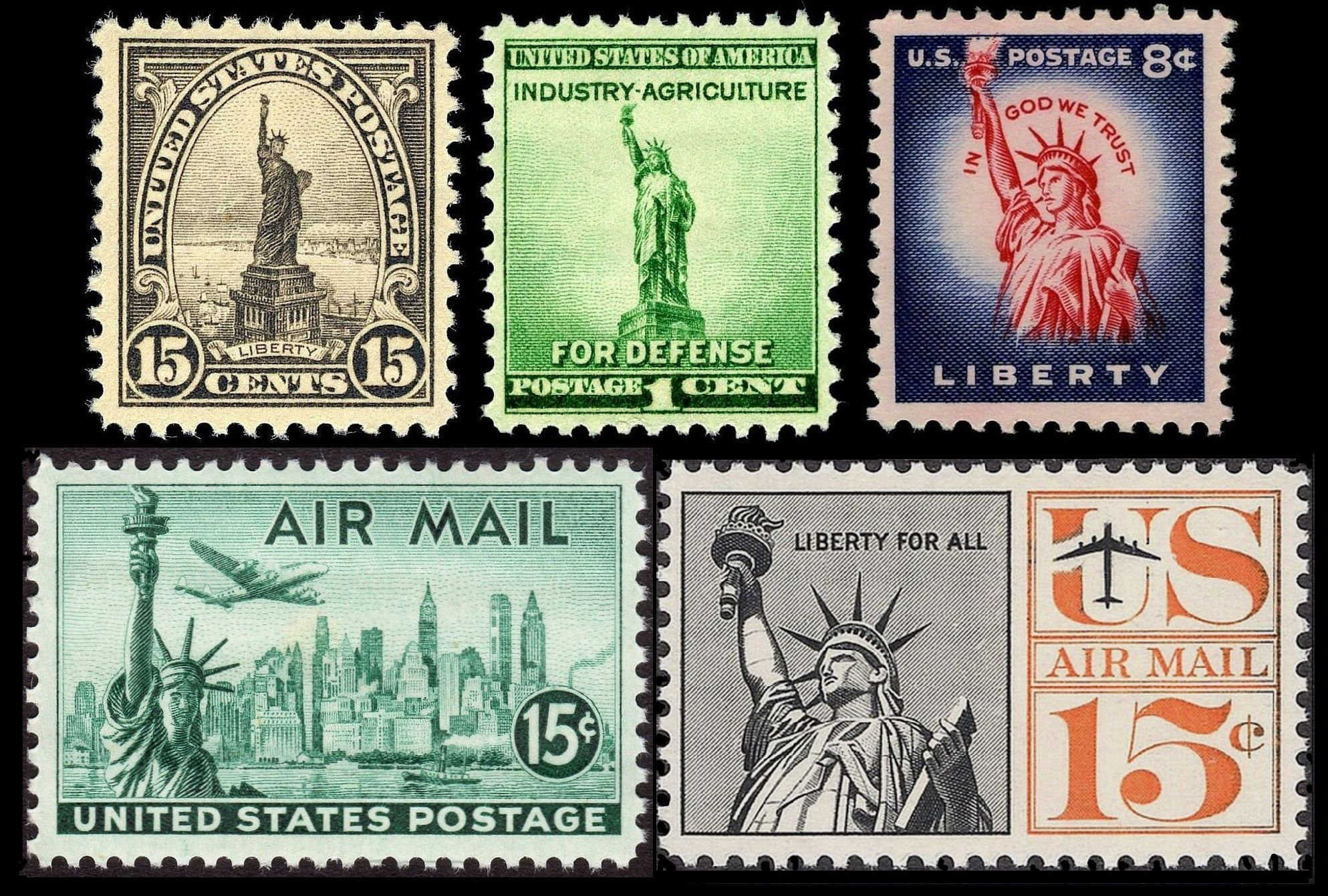
The Statue of Liberty has appeared on numerous US postage stamps. Selected issues, (clockwise) 1922, 1940, 1947, 1961, 1954 issues

The French commemorated the 100th anniversary of its gift of the Statue of Liberty to the United States by adding the statue's image to its 100 franc coin. For the 100th anniversary of the statue, the U.S. and France jointly issued a stamp featuring the Statue of Liberty. In addition, more than 100 countries celebrated the anniversary by issuing a postage stamp featuring the statue. Bangladesh, Morocco, Niger, Samoa, San Marino, and Sri Lanka recognized the United States Bicentennial by issuing stamps featuring the Statue of Liberty.

== Commercialization ==
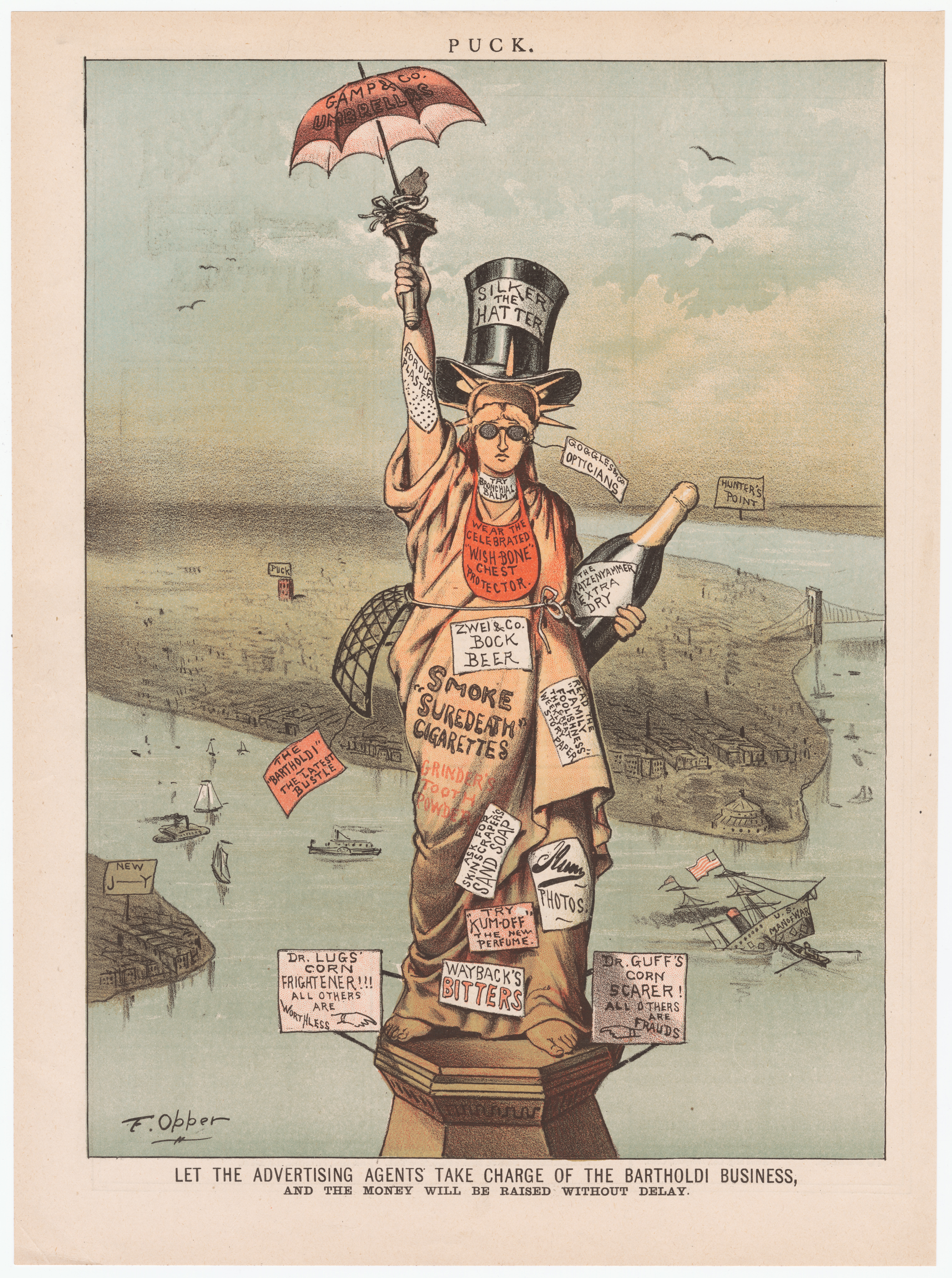
Satirical cartoon by Frederick Burr Opper depicting a commercialized Statue of Liberty, first published in Puck magazine, April 8, 1885

Imagery of the statue has been used for various commercial purposes, including advertising and merchandising. This began before it was unveiled; the statue's creator Frédéric Auguste Bartholdi licensed its image in both Europe and the United States, starting with France in 1875 and appearing on American products by 1877. For example, it was used to market Holmes & Coutts Famous Sea Form Wafers and Brainerd and Armstrong silk. Using the statue's imagery like this has been controversial and the subject of criticism, as parodied in a comic in Puck in 1885 that showed the statue covered in endorsements.

The Statue of Liberty continues to be used in corporate logos. The insurance company Liberty Mutual has used the Statue of Liberty as part of its logo since 1921. The Central Railroad of New Jersey used the statue in its logo from 1944 until it ceased operations in 1974, symbolizing its terminal at Liberty State Park. Its successor, NJ Transit Rail Operations's Raritan Valley Line, also uses the statue as its symbol. New York featured the Statue of Liberty on its regular license plate from 1986 until 2001, released shortly after the 100th anniversary of the statue.

Representing its origins in World War I with members from the New York City area, the United States Army 77th Sustainment Brigade uses a gold Statue of Liberty on a blue background as its identification badge and shoulder sleeve insignia. The division's official nickname is "Statue of Liberty". The mission flight insignia worn by the crew of STS-51-J, the debut launch of the Space Shuttle Atlantis in 1985, also features the Statue of Liberty.

The New York Rangers of the National Hockey League used the head of the Statue of Liberty as their logo on their third jersey from 1996 to 2007 and again in 2020–2021 and 2022–2023 seasons. Formed in 1996, New York Liberty of the Women's National Basketball Association tooks its name from the Statue of Liberty and also uses an illustration of the statue's torch as part of its team logo. The team selected its seaform green color from the copper patina of the statue.

== Immigration ==
"A Statue for Our Harbor," a cartoon by George Frederick Keller published in The Wasp depicting the Statue of Liberty in the San Francisco Bay, with a caricatured Chinese worker in place of Lady Liberty, November 11, 1881

There is a long association between the Statue of Liberty and immigration. Emma Lazarus wrote the sonnet "The New Colossus" (1883) to raise money to construct a pedestal for the Statue of Liberty. The poem is now on a plaque at the base of the statue, with the line "Give me your tired, your poor, Your huddled masses yearning to breathe free..."

Judge magazine was one of many in the 1880s and 1890s that used the statue in anti-immigration cartoons, such as its "Proposed Emigrant Dumping Site" which shows European ships leaving garbage at the base on the statue in response government's plan for immigrant processing facilities for processing immigrants on Liberty Island in 1890. In 1881, the statue was used to attack immigration in San Francisco by The Wasp, which published "A Statue for Our Harbor", showing the statue as a Chinese man holding an opium pipe as a torch. In 1917, concerns about possible communist immigrants was expressed in a political cartoon featuring the Statue of Liberty by James P. Alley in the Memphis Commercial Appeal and reprinted in The Literary Digest on July 5, 1919.

Numerous films use images of the Statue of Liberty to symbolize immigrations—the arrival to the United States and pursuit of the American Dream. An early example is Charlie Chaplin's The Immigrant (1917), where passengers stare at the Statue of Liberty as their ship arrives. In the opening credits of the film The Legend of 1900 (1998), an ocean liner enters New York harbor and the immigrant passengers cheer when they see the Statue of Liberary. In The Godfather Part II (1974), shots of the Statue of Liberty symbolize the American Dream for the young immigrant Vito Corleone. The Statue of Liberty is viewed from a boat approaching Ellis Island in the film The Immigrant (2013), mimicking the filmography of The Godfather Part II.

== Destruction ==
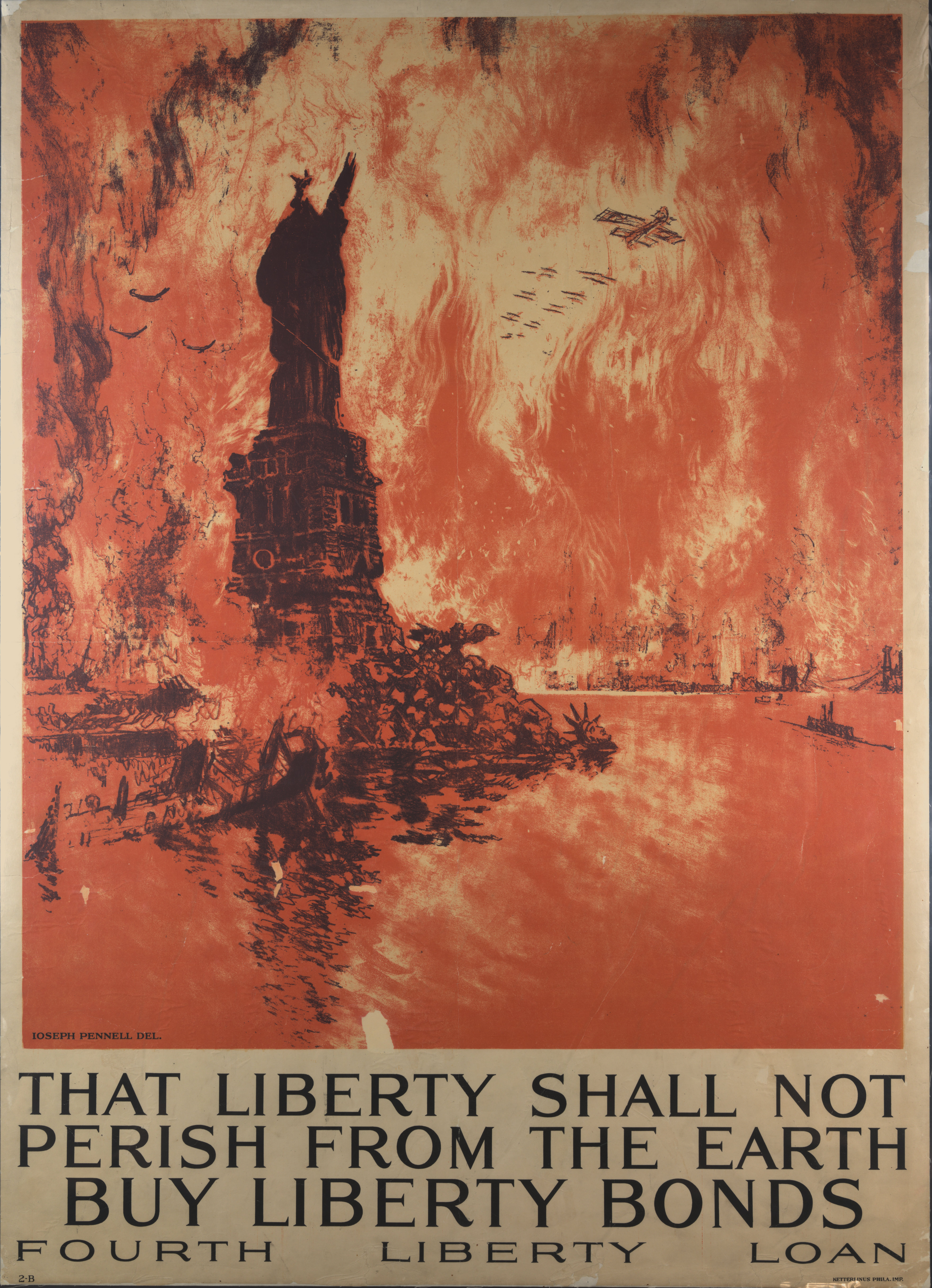
Joseph Pennell, That Liberty Shall Not Perish from the Earth (1918)

Damage to and destruction of the statue, or its remains appearing among devastated surroundings, is a recurring motif. The earliest known example is John Ames Mitchell's 1889 novel The Last American, where the statue overlooks the ruins of New York City a thousand years in the future. In George Allan England's novel Darkness and Dawn (1914), Statue of Liberty's torch is symbolically destroyed.

Joseph Pennell's 1918 poster "That Liberty Shall Not Perish from the Earth, Buy Liberty Bonds", created to sell war bonds during World War I, depicts the Statue of Liberty with her head and torch destroyed as war rages around her. The threat of destruction was a regular theme in fundraising advertisements for the statue's restoration ahead of its 1986 centennial.

Images of the statue's destruction in film often are a representation of the destruction of the United States. The 1968 film Planet of the Apes ends with a mostly submerged Statue of Liberty, revealing the destruction of human civilization. In Independence Day (1996), the statue is destroyed by alien invaders. In The Day After Tomorrow (2004), the Statue of Liberty is drowned by a tsunami. A depiction of the destroyed Statue of Liberty was used in the film and trailer for Cloverfield (2008), playing on post-9/11 fears for an attack on New York City.

== Film ==
Other films utilize the Statue of Liberty as a setting. For example, the Statue of Liberty's torch is the setting of the climax of Alfred Hitchcock's espionage film Saboteur (1942). In John Carpenter's Escape from New York (1981), the Statue of Liberty is the prison warden's headquarters; it is also Magneto's base in the film X-Men (2000). In the film Superman (1978), Superman takes Lois Lane on a ride flying around the Statue of Liberty.

Other films that feature the Statue of Liberty include the following.

- In Splash (1984), the mermaid Madison comes ashore in the nude during a tour of the Statue of Liberty.
- The film Liberty (1986) is a fictionalized account of the construction of the Statue of Liberty.
- In Ghostbusters II, (1989), the Statue of Liberty is brought to life by the Ghostbusters to help save New York City.
- The Statue of Liberty appears in the ending of the film Men in Black II (2002), where a neuralizer located in her torch is used to erase the memories of the entire population of New York City.
- The animated French comedy film The Triplets of Belleville (2003) parodies the Statue of Liberty as obese and holding a hamburger and a Coke.
- The finale of the film Meet Dave (2008) was filmed at the Statue of Liberty National Monument.
- In the film The Walk (2015), Phillippe Petit narrates from the torch of the Statue of Liberty.
- The climax of Spider-Man: No Way Home (2021) is set on and around the Statue of Liberty. The film was not released in China because its film board did not approve of the inclusion of the Statue of Liberty.

== Music ==
- Miss Liberty is a 1949 Broadway musical with a book by Robert E. Sherwood and music and lyrics by Irving Berlin that is based on the sculpting of the Statue of Liberty in 1886
- "Statue of Liberty' is a 1978 song by XTC. The BBC banned the single for the line "I sail beneath her skirt".
- The Dead Kennedys' depiction of the Statue of Liberty on the cover of the album Bedtime for Democracy (1986) to protest U.S policies.
- Toby Keith's 2002 song, "Courtesy of the Red, White and Blue (The Angry American)" refers to the Statue of Liberty to support the United States.
- Philthy Rich wrote and recorded the song "Statue of Liberty" in 2017.

== Politics and propaganda ==
Barry Moreno, in The Statue of Liberty Encyclopedia, writes that the statue was used for "patriotic art" during World War I, noting that its image was used to sell both French and American war bonds.

- During World War I, the Boston Committee of Public Safety issued a lithograph poster by Smith and Porter in 1917 that depicted the Statue of Liberty with a brightly shining torch. The poster was supposed to encourage enlistment into the United States Navy by creating feelings of patriotism and fear.
- The 1917 Liberty bond promotional poster "You, Buy A Liberty Bond / Lest I Perish" by Charles R. Macauley features the Statue of Liberty sternly pointing at the viewer.
- The Liberty bond poster "Remember Your First Thrill of American Liberty" targeted immigrants with its image of people viewing the Statue of Liberty from a ship. Another Liberty bond poster, published in Yiddish, features immigrants arriving to the image of the statue and notes:
  FOOD WILL WIN THE WAR
  You came here seeking freedom
  You must now help to preserve it
  WHEAT is needed for the allies
  Waste nothing
- Individuals who purchased a Liberty bond in 1917 and 1918 were rewarded with a "A Badge of Honor" pin that featured an illustration of the Statue of Liberty.
- The Libertarian Party of the United States uses the Statue of Liberty as its emblem.
- On the cover of the February 4, 2017 issue, the German magazine Der Spiegel showed the Statue of Liberty beheaded by Donald Trump.

== Television ==
The Statue of Liberty is a 1985 documentary film by Ken Burns on the history of the Statue of Liberty that was shown on PBS. The documentary was nominated for an Academy Award for Best Documentary Feature.

On April 8, 1983, CBS broadcast The Magic of David Copperfield V, where illusionist David Copperfield made the Statue of Liberty seemingly disappear. Copperfield said he chose the Statue of Liberty as a symbol of the "illusion of freedom". He said, "I thought that by making the Statue of Liberty – our symbol of freedom – vanish, I might make the audience aware of how important freedom is". The television show was watched by an estimated fifty million viewers, and is recognized by the Guinness World Records as "the largest illusion ever staged".

== Theme parks ==
- Epcot's The American Adventure attraction ends with Benjamin Franklin and Mark Twain standing on a life-size version of the Statue of Liberty's torch.
- The Liberty Arcade in Disneyland Paris features an exhibit about the Statue of Liberty and is a tribute to the statue and France's relationship with the United States.

== Visual arts ==
- Before the statue was completed, Currier and Ives published a print, The Great Bartholdi Statue, Liberty Enlightening the World, featuring its original design with a star lamp that could be used as lighthouse.
- Working on the Statue of Liberty, a 1946 painting by Norman Rockwell, shows workmen cleaning the torch held aloft by the statue. Originally created for the Saturday Evening Post, the painting now resides in the Oval Office of the White House.
- Pop artist Andy Warhol's painting Statue of Liberty (1962–63) sold for $43.8 million in 2012. He also produced the series Statues of Liberty (1986) for the centennial of the Statue of Liberty.
- Claes Oldenburg's Proposed Colossal Monument – Fan in Place of the Statue of Liberty (1967) is an artistic expression against monuments.
- Keith Haring, a graffiti artist, depicted the Statue of Liberty (1986) in his prints and as a statue covered with his drawings.
- Static (2009) by Steve McQueen is a seven-minute looping film of the Statue of Liberty, as viewed from a helicopter.
- Danh Võ's We The People (2010–2014) replicates the Statue of Liberty in 250 pieces at a scale of 1:1.

== Comics and cartoons ==
Before its completion, the Statue of Liberty became a subject for comedic and political cartoons in both the United States and abroad. Dani Aguila's Taking Liberty with the Lady (1986) is a collection of Statue of Liberty cartoons from around the world, demonstrating the versatility of the statue's image.

The Statue of Liberty has also been incorporated into comics. First introduced in 1941 during World War II, the DC Comics superhero Miss America was granted her powers by the Statue of Liberty in a dream, making her the embodiment of the statue's power. Using the Statue of Liberty as a symbol of America, comic books often have villains attacking or destroying the statue. This storyline was first used in 1942 during World War II, where the Human Torch (Jim Hammond) fought the Japanese spy Moppino who destroys the statue (All-Winners Comics #4, Marvel/Timely Comics). In later comics, the torch of the Statue of Liberty became the secret meeting place for the Human Torch (Johnny Storm) and Spider-Man.

Modern comics continue to include Statue of Liberty imagery. Swedish cartoonist Joakim Lindengren and Puerto Rican author Giannina Braschi created United States of Banana in 2017; in this parody comic book, Lady Liberty falls in love with a prisoner, Segismundo, who lives in a dungeon beneath her skirt. The statue complains, "I have inspired empires. I have destroyed empires. They turned me into the mausoleum of liberty".

== Video games ==
Numerous video games incorporate the destruction of the Statue of Liberty. After the War (1989) and Comix Zone (1995) both show a destroyed statue as part of apocalyptic settings. Double Dragon II (PC version 1993) shows the head of the Statue of Liberty on the spire of the Empire State Building, while Cyber-Lip (1990) calls upon patriotic players to avenge the destruction of the Statue of Liberty. Teenage Mutant Ninja Turtles: Turtles in Time (1992) use the theft of the statue as a plot device, while Tropico 6 (2019) allows the player to steal the Statue of Liberty, and Twisted Metal 2 (1996) allows players to ignite the Statue of Liberty's torch by firing missiles at it. In 1989's Ghostbusters II, a computer video game based on the film of the same name, the player must gain control of the Statue of Liberty and save New York City. The 2008 video game Grand Theft Auto IV features a parody of the statue called the Statue of Happiness, which holds a coffee cup instead of a torch.

== See also ==
- Reclining Liberty
- Replicas of the Statue of Liberty
- Statue of Liberty play, an American football tactic
