= The Last American =

The Last American may refer to:

- The Last American (comics), a 1990 comic book mini-series
- The Last American (novel), a novel by John Ames Mitchell
