= Queset House =

- 42°4′4.5″N 71°6′22.9″W
- Location: 51 North Main St, North Easton, MA

Other information
- Director: Uma Hiremath

Building details

General information
- Opened: 1854

Design and construction
- Architect: A.J. Downing

Website
- www.amesfreelibrary.org

Queset House is a house located at 51 Main Street, North Easton, Massachusetts next to the Ames Free Library. The house was built in 1854 from a design by noted architect Andrew Jackson Downing under commission from industrialist Oakes Angier Ames. In 1872 John Ames Mitchell designed its rear extension. Landscape architect Frederick Law Olmsted planned its grounds.

The Ames Free Library purchased the house in 2007. The building is used as an extension of the library's special programs, including monthly meetings of library groups.
