= Oakes Angier Ames =

American philanthropist and businessman

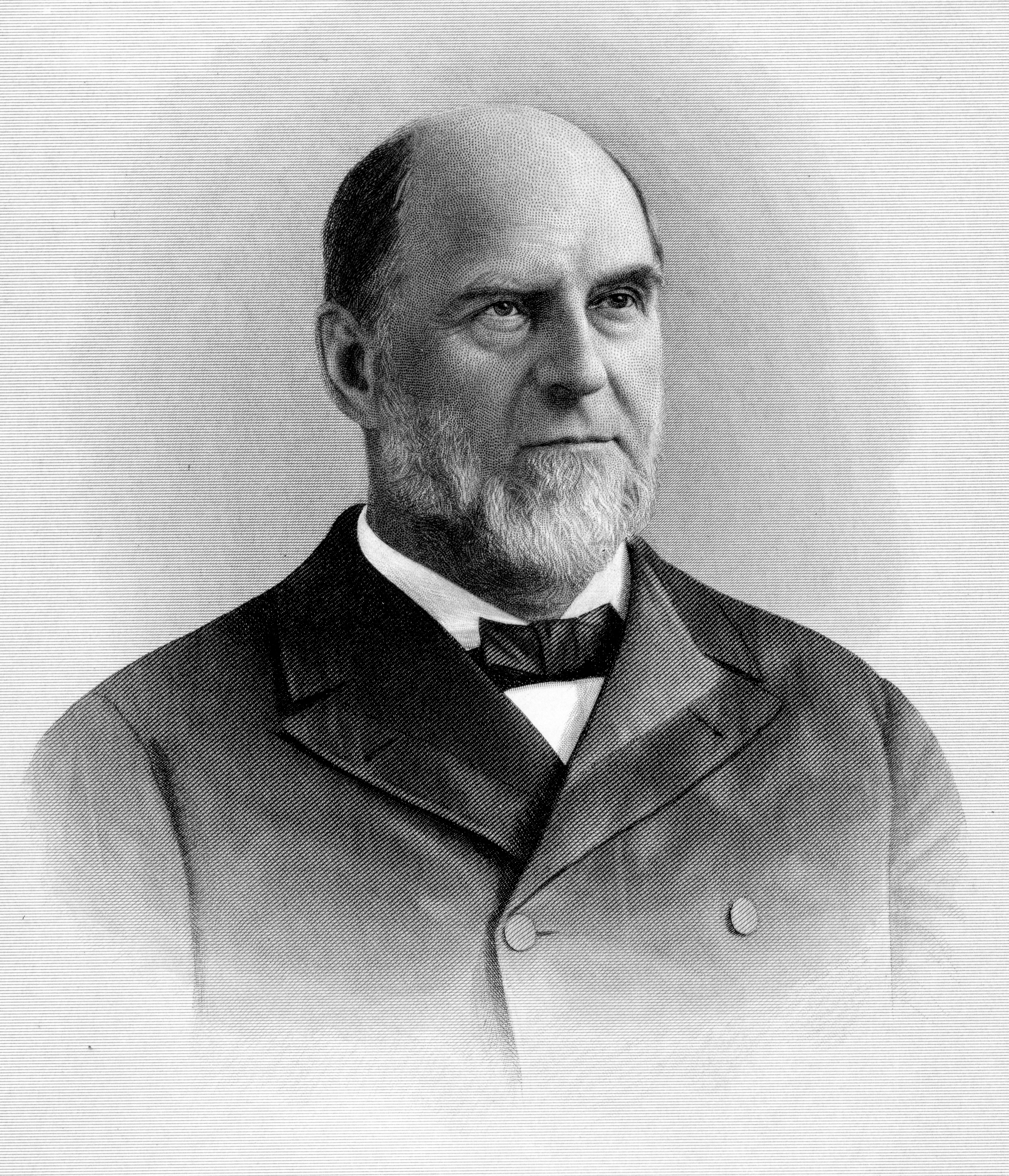
- Born: April 15, 1829; North Easton, Massachusetts
- Died: September 19, 1899 (aged 70)
- Occupations: Businessman, investor, philanthropist
- Known for: Ames Shovel Shop
- Parent(s): Oakes Ames, Evelina O. Gilmore
- Relatives: Oliver Ames (brother); Oliver Ames Sr. (grandfather); Capt. John Ames (great-grandfather)

Signature
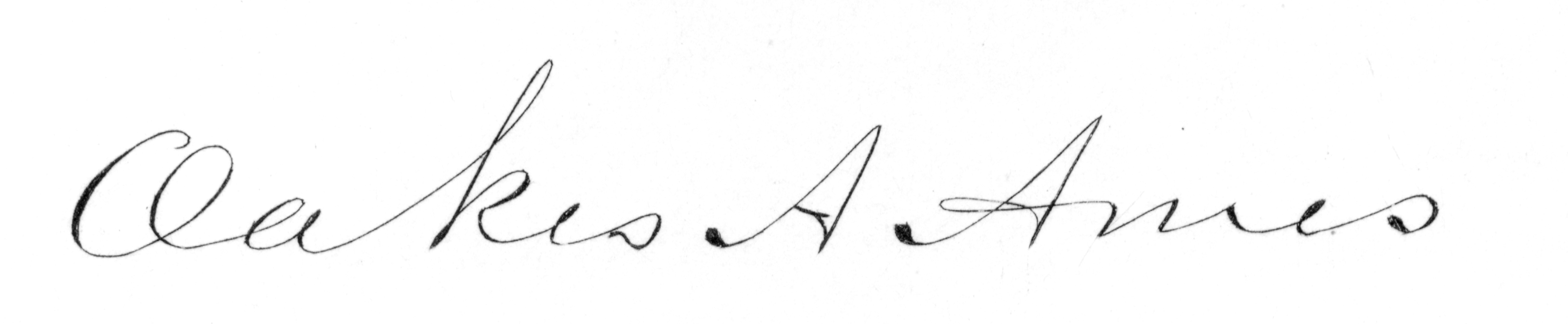

Oakes Angier Ames (April 15, 1829 – September 19, 1899) was an American businessman, investor, and philanthropist in the Ames family of North Easton, Massachusetts.

He was an heir to the Oliver Ames and Sons Corporation and Ames Shovel and Tool Company and was born into a family already known to be successful in business and philanthropic towards the townsfolk, many of whom were employed by the Ames'. He served as superintendent in 1873 and then President of the Company in 1877, overseeing all workings in the factory. He was credited with managing to resolve the most notable worker strike in the town's history that lasted for almost two months in 1889.

Before his death, Oakes Angier Ames had helped manage a highly prosperous family business and commissioned buildings for the betterment of the town of Easton (including a schoolhouse in North Easton). He served as President of the North Easton Savings Bank and Vice-President of the Easton National Bank, was a Director of the Lincoln National Bank of Boston and the Kingsley Iron Machine Company, trustee of the State Lunatic Asylum in Taunton, MA (Taunton State Hospital), Director of the American Loan and Trust Company and of the United Electric Securities Company, and co-owned a sugar plantation in Louisiana.

== Family ==
Oakes Angier Ames was the oldest son of Massachusetts Congressman Oakes Ames (1804-1873) (a major force behind the Union Pacific Railroad) and brother of Oliver Ames (governor) (1831-1895), 35th Governor of Massachusetts from 1887-1890, Frank Morton Ames, Henry Gilmore Ames and Susan Eveline (Ames) French. His mother, Evelina Orville Gilmore, was the daughter of Joshua and Hannah (Lothrop) Gilmore of Easton, Massachusetts. The Ames family lineage from which he was descended can be traced back to William Ames who emigrated with his brother John to New England in 1635 and settled in Bridgewater, Massachusetts. His great-grandfather Capt. John Ames and grandfather Oliver Ames Sr. founded the Ames Shovel Works during a time when shovels were needed to build canals and railroads. The Ames family was among the wealthiest in Massachusetts.

== Early life ==
Oakes Angier attended public school in Easton, MA. He then attended Fruit Hill Academy in Rhode Island and the Leicester Academy (Massachusetts) and entered the family business at the age of eighteen. He learned how shovels were made and became skilled in handling the affairs of the workers.

The Oliver Ames and Sons Company of Oakes Angiers’ grandfather Oliver Ames Sr. (known as Old Oliver) was originally located across from Shovelshop Pond in Easton, MA. On March 2, 1852, Oakes Angier witnessed the great fire that destroyed all buildings and subsequently became ill due to smoke inhalation while trying in vain to stop the destruction. It was believed at the time that he had contracted Consumption and was sent to Cuba to help his lungs heal. On December 28, 1852, Evelina Ames received word from her son that he had arrived in Cuba after departing from Charleston, S.C. six days prior. When he returned he was in much better health.

The watchman at the time of the fire was a man by the name of Patric Quinn. Quinn, during his nightly round, accidentally dropped a lantern into highly flammable varnish. The finishing shop burst into flames and quickly caught fire to the rest of the buildings. At the time, the Ames family was considering moving the shovel making operation to another location entirely and so there was a silver lining to this devastating event. It is suggested that the fire made such a lasting impression on Oakes Angier that he was the first family member to build his home, Queset House, out of stone. The new shovel factory was also built out of stone, as were many future Ames structures.

It was often customary at the time for previous generations to live with their sons and daughters. Oakes Angier lived into his mid-twenties with his father Oakes and his mother Evelina in the house originally built by his grandfather Old Oliver. Old Oliver continued to live in a section of the house with his son and daughter-in-law until his own death. Their house was located on Main Street across from the company shops and is no longer standing. When the Queset House was finished, Oakes brought his new bride, Catherine (Hobart) Ames to live there and raise a family.

== Business ==
In 1863, Oakes Angier Ames's grandfather, Oliver Ames Sr. (1779-1863), passed away leaving the Oliver Ames and Sons Company and all private property to the remaining Ames family members of Easton, Massachusetts. To his three grandsons, Oakes Angier, Oliver and Frederick Lothrop Ames, he bequeathed one-third of the Company interest divided equally, thus making them partners. His other grandson, Frank Morton Ames, became prosperous in his own right as President of the Kingsley Iron and Machine Company of Canton, Massachusetts. In the midst of the Civil War, the three grandsons of Oliver Ames worked together to maintain and expand the already thriving family business. Oliver became involved in business ventures relating to the Company outside of Easton, MA. Frederick was treasurer and secretary. Oakes Angier was supervisor, general manager, and then President from 1877 until his death. By that time the Company was producing approximately 117,500 dozen shovels per year, with 500 men working 10hr work days.

While supervisor, he obtained an antrim patent in 1863 for his welding furnace designed to balance the temperatures needed to weld a shovel blade and the strap.

In 1873, he and his brother Frank Morton Ames purchased what would become the Southside and Estelle Plantations in Jefferson Parish, Louisiana, for $180,000.The plantations were known at the time to be quite cutting edge in the methods of harvesting sugar and transporting the finished product. 60,000 to 70,000 pounds of sugar were produced a day. His time spent in Cuba as a young man may have influenced his interest in owning a sugar plantation.

In 1879, while President of the Company, he helped finance 50% of the cost for a church in the center of Easton. The cost was $1,400. Originally a Methodist church, the new denomination was affiliated with the Swedish Evangelical Covenant Church. Prior to the purchase of the new church, the growing number of Swedish immigrants who worked in the Company had to practice their religion in various private homes. Oakes Angier also lent the use of a hall on Main Street to the Swedish for services. Assistance in providing a place of worship was consistent with the Ames family tradition. They also had a chapel built on Pond St. for the Irish workforce.

=== Strike of 1889 ===
William Chaffin wrote in History of the Town of Easton that Oakes Angier had a temperament well suited for work as manager to the Company workers, and that he was also very knowledgeable to the process of making shovels. His character would serve him well in regards to the strike. His life was an example of integrity and compassion towards workers and other townspeople who sometimes required assistance. Although there had been a few documented instances of dissension among workers before the strike of 1889, none were as well documented, nor did they result in so many workers being let go or disruption in shovel production.

In shovel making, it is the handlers job to weld straps to steel-edged shovels. Handlers employed by the Oliver Ames and Sons Company at the time of the strike became disgruntled over a Company policy that had been put in place years prior.

On February 22, 1889, twenty-three handlers walked off the job, returning the following day after forming a committee to speak with General Manager Oakes Angier Ames regarding the rules. He responded that the rules put in place were necessary and explained why that was. Despite that, some of the Ames’ had been handlers themselves and the Company was known for good wages and fair business practices, the handlers did not return to work. Oakes Angier, after giving the strikers until March 4 to return, was forced to hire replacements. His son Hobart and Governor Oliver Ames' son William were in charge of training the Swedish replacement workers. Hobart was also in charge of protecting replacement workers from harassment by strikers. While Oakes Angier did request in writing that strikers leave tenement housing, he never evicted them. The only arrest was a James Riley for undue violence. On April 12, 1889, the strike ended and some sixteen strikers returned to work under the same rules. Only five strikers were not allowed to return to work as handlers. Two of them had already found work elsewhere and the other three were employed as gardeners on Ames estates. Shovel sales suffered but still managed to surpass previous years sales by $950.27.

== Queset House ==
Oakes Angier Ames' legacy to North Easton can still be seen in Queset House, his home beside the Queset Brook. Built of stone, Queset stands on property to the rear of the Ames Free Library. His son, famous theatrical producer Winthrop Ames, also lived in the house with his wife Lucy after inheriting it from his father. The property is now owned by the library and functions as a center for cultural programming. Queset was commissioned to be built in 1853 and it was completed the following year. The house's front portion design was drawn from a plan by noted architect Andrew Jackson Downing (who died in 1852). Downing collaborated with Alexander Jackson Davis who provided architectural drawings. It was built in the Gothic Revival style. Harvard educated architect John Ames Mitchell, (a first cousin of Oakes Angier and architect of the Unity Church of North Easton, MA) designed the rear in 1873. He also added the copper-clad chimneys and a new staircase. The landscape architect Frederick Law Olmsted planned its grounds and also, in consultation with Ames, created The Rockery nearby.

Together with his family, Ames commissioned Olmsted and architect H. H. Richardson to create a remarkable set of buildings and landscapes in North Easton, including:

- Ames Gate Lodge
- Oakes Ames Memorial Hall
- Old Colony Railroad Station
- The Rockery
- F.L. Ames Gardener's Cottage

== Personal ==
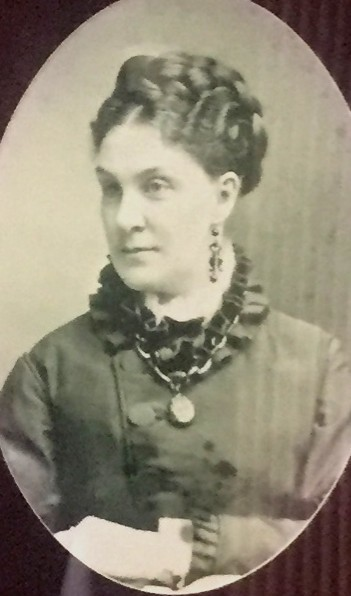
Catherine (Hobart) Ames

Oakes Angier was a Unitarian (Unitarianism). He was chairman of the Church Committee and rarely, if ever, missed Sabbath. He married Catherine Hobart in East Bridgewater, Massachusetts on July 19, 1855. They had six children, although two did not survive past infancy:

- Maria Hobart Ames born October 13, 1856, married Richard Hickman Harte
- Oakes Ames born May 8, 1858 - died May 8, 1859 ???
- Oakes Angier Ames born January 21, 1862 - died August 1, 1862
- Hobart Ames born August 21, 1865, married Julia A. (Hillis) Colony
- Winthrop Ames born November 25, 1870, married Lucy K. Fuller
- Katherine Hobart Ames born January 11, 1874, married Philip Leffingwell Spalding

Catherine Angier died on April 18, 1903. She had lived a quiet life but was remembered at the time of her death as being heavily involved in local charitable work. She was not connected with any particular organization.

== Selected works ==
- Oakes Ames and the Credit Mobilier, Boston, F. Wood, printer, 1880.
- The Architecture of Country Houses, Downing, A. Jackson, New York: Dover Publications, Inc., 1969.

== See also ==
- Ames family

== Bibliography ==
- US US548496A, Ames, Oakes, "Welding Furnace", issued 1895
- Dell Upton (1998) Architecture in the United States, Oxford University Press, page 95. ISBN 0-19-284217-X.
- Forest Systems: Queset House
- Diary of a Yankee Housewife, Sarah L. Ames
- "Mrs. Catherine H. Ames Dead", Boston Herald, Boston, MA, p. 4, April 19, 1903
- Ames, William (November 18, 2017). "Shovelshop Pond original supervisor" (interview).
- Ames, Winthrop (1938), The Ames Family of Easton, Massachusetts, Private Print.
- Chaffin, William L. (1886), History of the Town of Easton, Massachusetts, Cambridge: John Wilson and Son, University Press ISBN 0-88082-182-5.
- Chaplin, Ann T. (2004),Descendants of William Ames of Braintree, Massachusetts, Newbury Street Press ISBN 0-88082-182-5.
- Hands, Edmund: Second Vice-President Easton Historical Society (November 7, 2017). "Queset House and Oakes Angier international travel" (interview).
- Herringshaw, Thomas W. (1902), "Ancestry.com", Herringshaw's Encyclopedia of American Biography of the Nineteenth Century, Chicago, IL: American Publishers Association, p. 40
- Ingham, John N. (1983), Biographical Dictionary of American Business Leaders, Greenwood Press, page 16. ISBN 0-313-23907-X.
- Johnson, Rossiter (1904), "Ancestry.com", Twentieth Century Biographical Dictionary of Notable Americans, vol. 1, Boston, MA: The Biographical Society
- Johnson, Rossiter, ed. (1906). "Ames, Oakes Angier". The Biographical Dictionary of America. Vol. 1. Boston: American Biographical Society. p. 105.
- Kenneally, James J. (2013), "Even in the Best of Families: The 1889 Strike at the Ames Shovel Company", Easton Historical Society: Reminiscences, 4: 12–21
- McEntee, M.; et al. (1886–1974), History of Easton, Massachusetts, vol. 2, Lorell Press, Inc.
- Meninno, Frank: Easton Historical Society Curator (November 18, 2017) "Ames fund Catholic Chapel" (interview)
- New England Historic Genealogical Society (NEHGS), Oakes Angier Ames obituary
- Swanson, Betsy (2004),Historic Jefferson Parish: From Shore to Shore, Korea: Pelican Publishing Company ISBN 0-88289-048-4.
