= Win Sein Tawya =

Buddhist complex in Myanmar

- ဝင်းစိန်တောရ
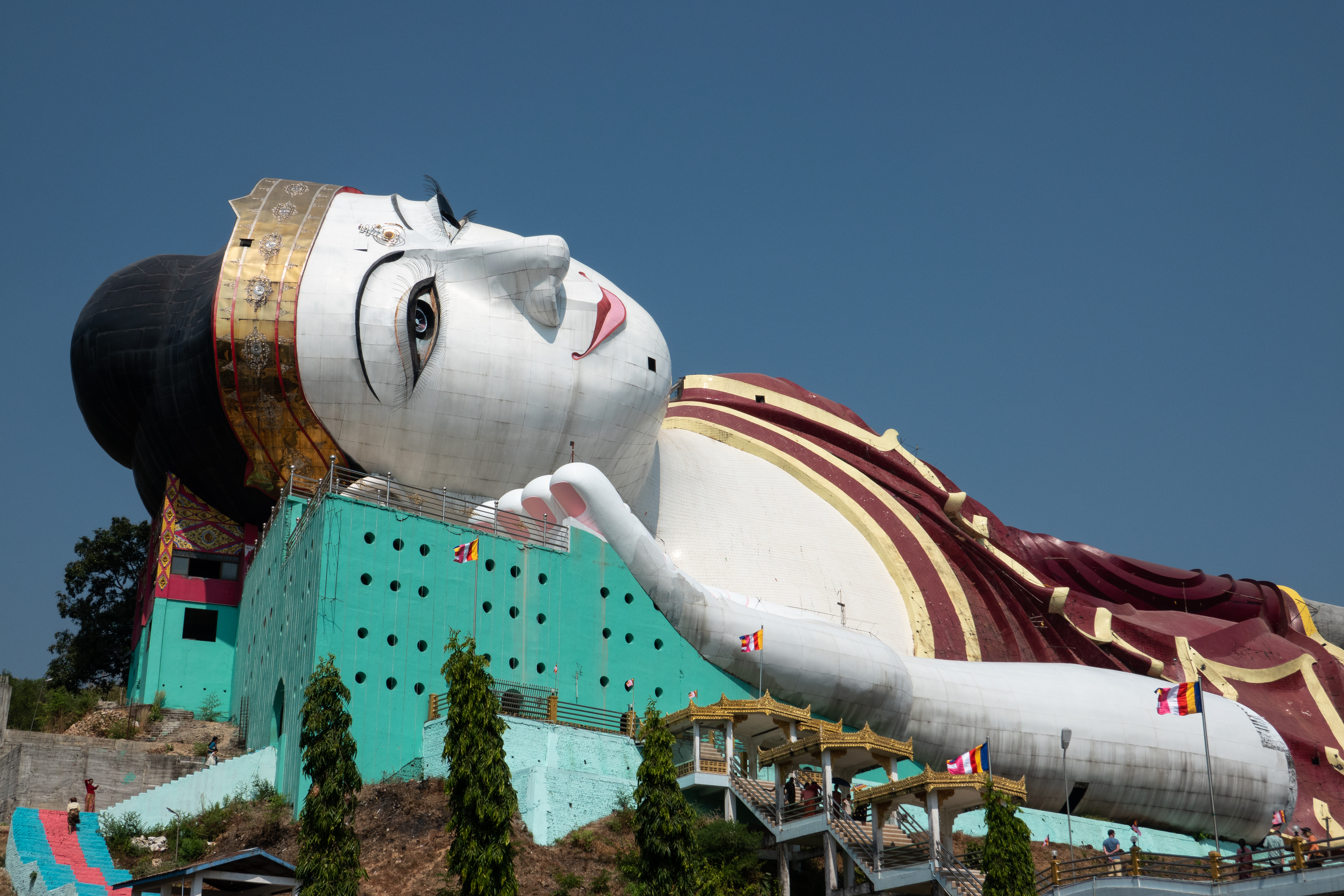

Religion
- Affiliation: Theravada Buddhism
- Deity: Buddha

Location
- Location: Mudon, Mon State
- Country: Myanmar
- Interactive map of Win Sein Tawya
- Coordinates: 16.32335°N 97.72447°E

Architecture
- Completed: c. 1300s

Win Sein Tawya (Burmese: ဝင်းစိန်တောရ; also spelt Win Sein Taw Ya) is a Buddhist complex near Mudon, Mon State, Myanmar. It is home to the world's largest free-standing reclining Buddha, which is 180 metres (590 ft) long and 30 metres (98 ft) tall. The site is surrounded by many stupas, monastic buildings, and statues. A temple festival is held every February to mark the birthday of Win Sein Sayadaw, the site's founding monk. In 2012, construction on a second reclining Buddha facing the original statue, began.

The construction of the reclining Buddha began on February 29, 1992, which was initiated by the revered monk Win Sein Taw Ya Sayadaw. The interior of the statue is designed as a multi-level museum featuring numerous chambers that depict scenes from the life of the Buddha, as well as representations of Buddhist teachings and interpretations of hell.
