= Statues of Liberty (Warhol series) =

Series of Andy Warhol paintings

Statue of Liberty
- Artist: Andy Warhol
- Year: 1986
- Medium: Acrylic and silkscreen ink on canvas
- Dimensions: 182.88 cm × 182.88 cm (72.00 in × 72.00 in)
- Location: The Broad, Los Angeles
- Accession: F-WARH-1P08.14

Statues of Liberty is a series of silkscreen paintings created in 1986 by American artist Andy Warhol. Produced during the centennial year of the arrival in New York Harbor of Frédéric Auguste Bartholdi's Statue of Liberty (Liberty Enlightening the World), the series is distinctive for its camouflage motifs. Already one of the most recognizable symbols of the United States, the Statue of Liberty became, in Warhol's interpretation, both a national emblem and a quintessential Pop icon, embodying ideas of freedom, consumerism, and the American Dream.

The series debuted at Galerie Lavignes-Bastille in Paris in April 1986. One of the paintings was featured on the cover of New York magazine in May 1986.

== Background ==
Pop artist Andy Warhol first depicted the Statue of Liberty early in his career, producing Statue of Liberty. This silkscreen composition repeated the monument's image twenty-four times in a grid-like arrangement. Based on a postcard image of New York Harbor, the early work reflected his developing fascination with repetition, mass media, and iconic American imagery.

More than two decades later, Warhol revisited the subject during a period of renewed artistic productivity in the mid-1980s. The latter series coincided with the 1986 centennial celebration of the Statue of Liberty, which received extensive media coverage throughout the United States.

The monument, designed by French sculptor Frédéric-Auguste Bartholdi and engineered by Gustave Eiffel, had originally been presented as a gift from France to the United States in honor of the alliance forged during the American Revolution. The centennial celebrations culminated during the Fourth of July weekend of 1986, when U.S. President Ronald Reagan presided over the unveiling of the newly restored statue following a two-year restoration campaign.

== Description ==
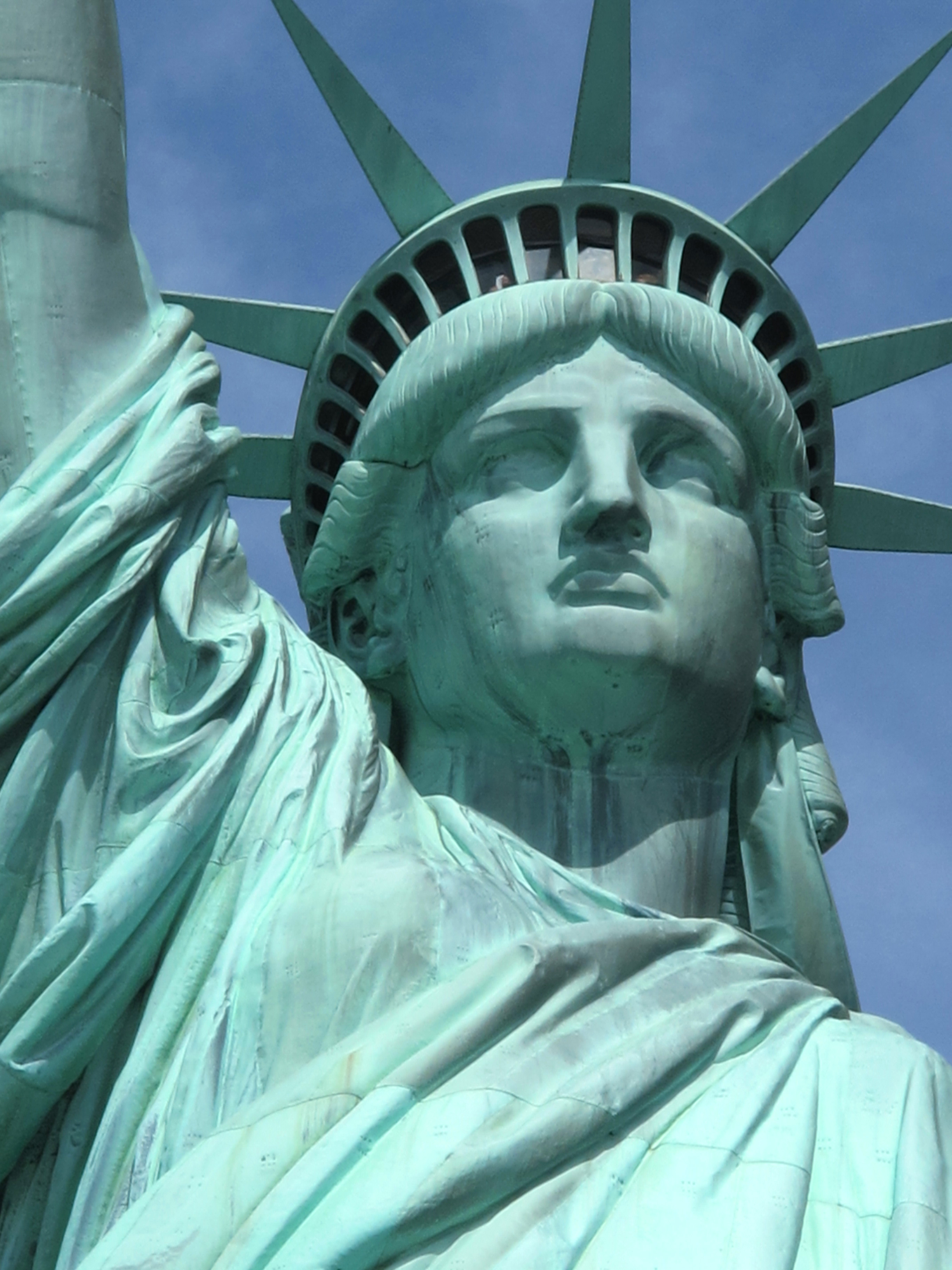
Close-up of the Statue of Liberty (Liberty Enlightening the World) in New York Harbor

Warhol created the Statues of Liberty paintings using his signature silkscreen technique based on a photographic source image. Warhol, long fascinated by advertising and media spectacle, drew inspiration for the series from a commemorative cookie tin featuring the Statue of Liberty. The paintings retain the branding from the original packaging, including the text "Fabis: les bon biscuits" alongside French and American flags.

The paintings are large-scale square compositions, measuring approximately 72 x 72 in. Unlike Warhol's early 1960s depictions of the full monument, the 1986 works isolate Lady Liberty's face and crown in a tightly cropped close-up format. Most of the portraits feature brightly colored camouflage patterns superimposed over the image, although Warhol also produced monochromatic versions.

== Interpretation ==
Warhol's use of camouflage in the Statues of Liberty series reflected a broader artistic interest that occupied much of his later work during the 1980s. He incorporated similar camouflage patterns into several painting series in 1986, including Camouflage, Last Supper and his Self-Portraits.

Warhol's fascination with camouflage has been connected to contemporary street culture among younger artists associated with graffiti and Neo-pop movements, including Keith Haring and Kenny Scharf. Camouflage also appealed to Warhol for its qualities as a form of readymade abstraction: a pattern designed simultaneously to attract attention and conceal identity.

In the Statues of Liberty paintings, camouflage performs a dual visual function by both highlighting and obscuring the monument. Christie's interpreted this strategy as a commentary on the contradictions embedded within "Reagan-era politics that shaped the nation and the provocative sentiment 'freedom isn't free.' A powerful political critique clad in the vivid candy-colors of Pop, Warhol’s Statue of Liberty is a potent reminder that his most iconic imagery is always more complex than its gleaming Pop surface would suggest."

== Exhibitions ==
The series premiered at Galerie Lavignes-Bastille in Paris, where the exhibition 10 Statues of Liberty 1986 was held from April 8 through May 30, 1986. The show was sponsored by the Club Pommery, which paid for the catalog to accompany the show. Although Warhol did not attend the official opening, he visited the gallery during a trip to Paris. In his diary, he recorded seeing the exhibition on April 12, 1986.

Four Statue of Liberty paintings were included in the exhibition Andy Warhol at Galerie de Bellecour-Jean-Marc Michali in Lyon from February to March 1987.

== Critical reception ==
Art critic Guy Burn of Arts Review described Warhol's Statues of Liberty as featuring "the rather grim head" of the statue staring "out of the huge canvases in the most intimidating manner," while noting that "the colours are often very seductive." Burn argued that "Warhol as usual injects doubt into the spectator, for we are three times removed from reality. It is a commercial reproduction of a photographic reproduction of a stone reproduction of a woman's head."

Art historian José María Faerna observed that "by bringing together into a single image a brand of cookies and one of the most distinctive emblems of American civilization, Warhol simultaneously presents two thematic veins that persist throughout his entire production."

== Collections ==
Paintings from the Statues of Liberty series have been included in several notable collections such as the Galerie Thaddaeus Ropac in Paris and the collection of Michali Gallery in Palm Beach. The Broad in Los Angeles holds a red, white, and blue camouflage version, while the Andy Warhol Museum in Pittsburgh holds a monochrome green version.

== Art market ==
In May 2001, Statue of Liberty (1986), in blue camouflage, sold for $391,000 at Christie's.

In November 2008, Statue of Liberty (1986), in pink, blue, and orange camouflage, sold for $2.2 million at Christie's.

In November 2016, Statue of Liberty (1986), in shades of steel blue camouflage, sold for $3.7 million at Christie's.

== In pop culture ==
One of the Statue of Liberty paintings, depicting a pink statue with red shadows against a blue background, was featured on the cover of the May 12, 1986 issue of New York magazine. His Camouflage Statue of Liberty, rendered in brown and beige military camouflage pattern, appeared on the cover of the February 4, 1991, issue.
