= Reclining Liberty =

2001 sculpture by Zaq Landsberg

- The sculpture in Chicago in 2026
- Artist: Zaq Landsberg
- Year: 2021

Reclining Liberty is a 2021 sculpture by Zaq Landsberg. The 25-foot-long statue weighs approximately 2,000 pounds. It has been installed in Harlem, in Jersey City, and at the Museum of Contemporary Art Arlington. It is currently installed at Millennium Park in Chicago. It is modeled after the Statue of Liberty (Liberty Enlightening the World) by Frédéric Auguste Bartholdi and the reclining Buddha statues of Asia.

Sign in Chicago, 2026

== See also ==
- Statue of Liberty in popular culture
