= Miss Liberty =

Musical

- Sheet music cover
- Music: Irving Berlin
- Lyrics: Irving Berlin
- Book: Robert E. Sherwood
- Basis: The Statue of Liberty
- Productions: 1949 Broadway

Miss Liberty is a 1949 Broadway musical with a book by Robert E. Sherwood and music and lyrics by Irving Berlin. It is based on the sculpting of New York City's Statue of Liberty (Liberty Enlightening the World) in 1886. The score includes the song "Give Me Your Tired, Your Poor", a musical setting of Emma Lazarus's sonnet "The New Colossus" (1883), which was placed at the base of the monument in 1903.

== Plot ==
In 1885, New York Herald publisher James Gordon Bennett assigns novice reporter Horace Miller to find the woman who served as Frédéric Auguste Bartholdi's model for the Statue of Liberty. In the artist's Paris studio, Miller sees a photograph of Monique DuPont and mistakenly believes she was the one. Bennett arranges for her and her grandmother to accompany Horace back to New York City, where she becomes a media darling. When rival publisher Joseph Pulitzer discovers it was Bartholdi's mother who actually posed for him, he exposes Monique as a fraud in his New York World. She faces deportation until a sympathetic Pulitzer comes to her rescue, paving the way for her to plan a future with Horace, who jilts his American girlfriend Maisie Doll in favor of the French beauty.

== Background and productions ==
During World War II, Robert Sherwood was deeply moved when he saw what the Statue of Liberty meant to American GIs who were being shipped overseas, and he wanted to write a story about this symbol of freedom. While crossing the Atlantic on the Queen Mary with 15,000 recruits, the playwright had been "deeply moved" and "greatly impressed by the emotion that sight of the statue generated among these soldiers." Upon meeting Irving Berlin in England, he invited him to compose the score, and Berlin suggested Moss Hart become part of the creative team as a co-producer and director. The book and score were completed in May 1949 and a cast of fifty-five began rehearsals. The musical opened in Philadelphia on June 13 and, despite mostly negative reviews, the four-week-long run was a sellout, resulting in a profit of $175,000.

With an advance sale of $500,000, the Broadway production opened at the Imperial Theatre on July 15, 1949, and closed on April 8, 1950, following 308 performances. Directed by Moss Hart and choreographed by Jerome Robbins, the cast included Eddie Albert as Horace Miller, Allyn McLerie as Monique DuPont, Mary McCarty as Maisie Doll, Philip Bourneuf as Joseph Pulitzer, and Charles Dingle as James Gordon Bennett, with Maria Karnilova and Tommy Rall among the supporting players. Oliver Smith designed the sets. Ward Morehouse of the New York Sun thought it was a "sharp disappointment," Richard Watts, Jr. of the New York Post felt it was "only pretty fair," and the Variety critic, citing an "overly-plotty book, undistinguished score, insufficient comedy and merely adequate performances," described it as "something of a clinker." Despite the poor reviews, many of its songs become popular hits, and 98 singles and three albums of the show's tunes were released. Weekly profits ranged from $5,000 to $9,000, although a six-week tour lost about $25,000.

42nd Street Moon in San Francisco produced the musical in November 2005.

== Songs ==
Act 1

- Extra, Extra - Newsboys and Ensemble
- What Do I Have to Do to Get My Picture Took? - Maisie Doll, Horace Miller, and Dancers
- The Most Expensive Statue in the World - Joseph Pulitzer, James Gordon Bennett, the Mayor, Singers, and Dancers
- A Little Fish in a Big Pond - Horace Miller, Maisie Doll, and the Sharks
- Let's Take an Old-Fashioned Walk - Horace Miller, Monique DuPont, Singers, and Dancers
- Homework - Maisie Doll
- Paris Wakes Up and Smiles - Monique DuPont and Ensemble
- Only for Americans The Countess - Horace Miller, Singers, and Dancers
- Just One Way to Say I Love You - Horace Miller and Monique DuPont

Act 2

- Miss Liberty - Entire Company
- The Train - Monique DuPont and the Train
- You Can Have Him - Maisie Doll and Monique DuPont
- The Policeman's Ball - Maisie Doll, the Dandy, and Ensemble
- Homework (Reprise) - Maisie Doll
- Follow the Leader Jig - Ensemble
- Me and My Bundle - Horace Miller, Monique DuPont, and Company
- Falling Out of Love Can Be Fun - Maisie Doll
- Give Me Your Tired, Your Poor (from the poem The New Colossus by Emma Lazarus) - Monique DuPont and Singers

== See also ==
- Statue of Liberty in popular culture
