= Reclining Buddha =

Major theme of Buddhist art

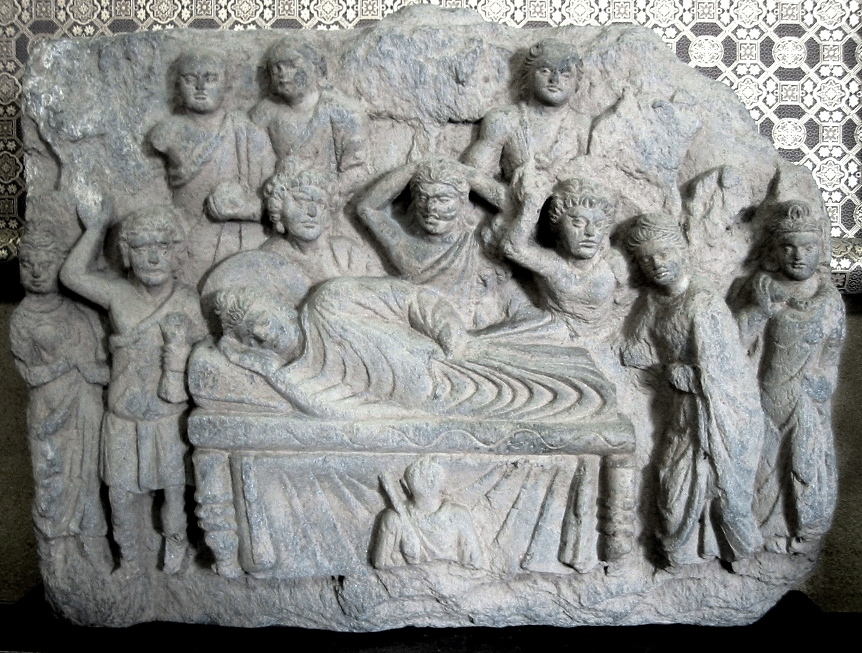
Buddha in parinirvana, Gandhara art, 2nd or 3rd century

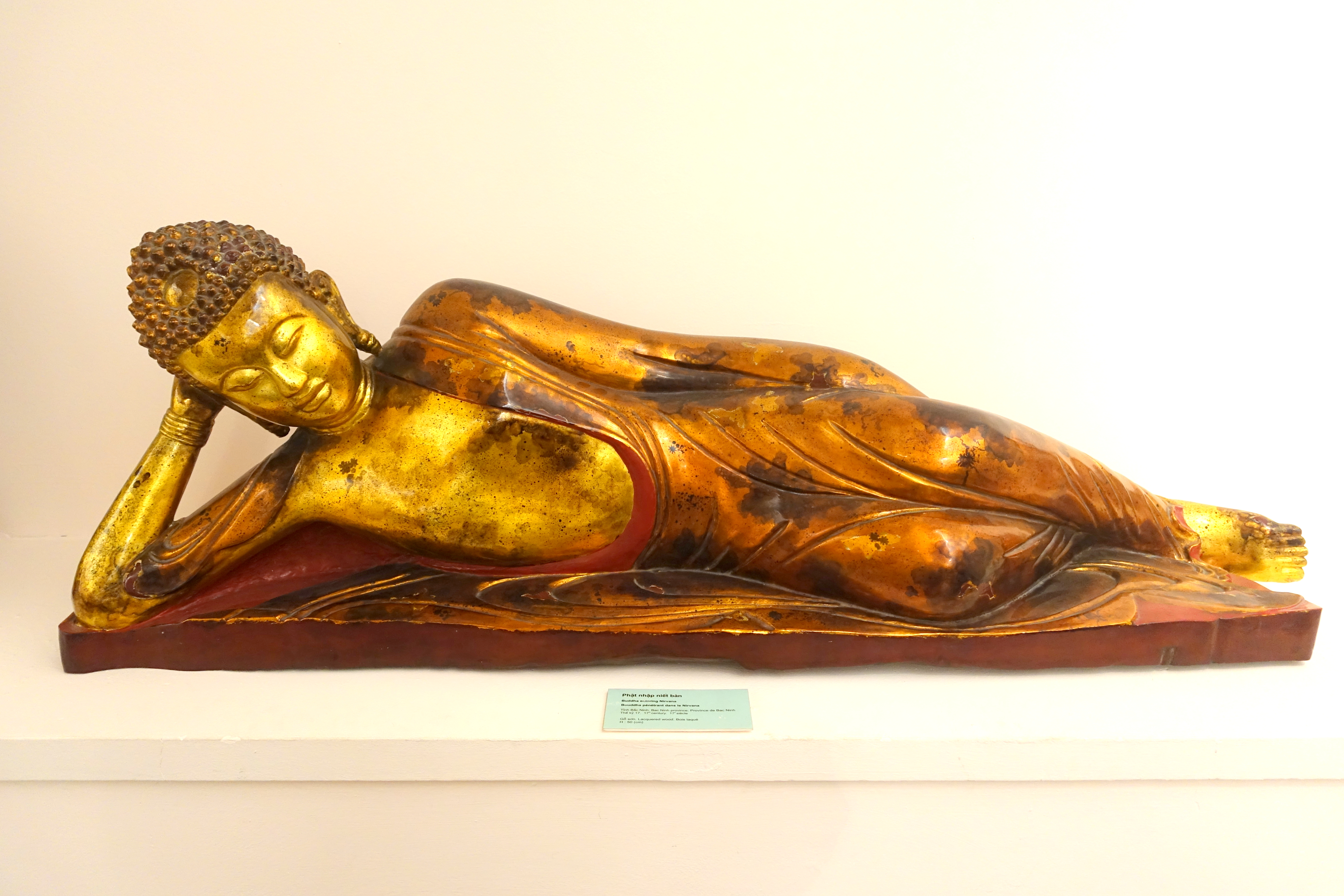
Buddha entering nirvana, Bắc Ninh province, Vietnam, 17th century AD

A reclining Buddha is an image that represents Buddha lying down and is a major iconographic theme in Buddhist art. It represents the historical Buddha during his last illness, about to enter the parinirvana. He is lying on his right side, his head resting on a cushion or relying on his right elbow, supporting his head with his hand.

This pattern seems to have emerged at the same time as other representations of the Buddha in the Greco-Buddhist art of Gandhara.

== In Thai art ==
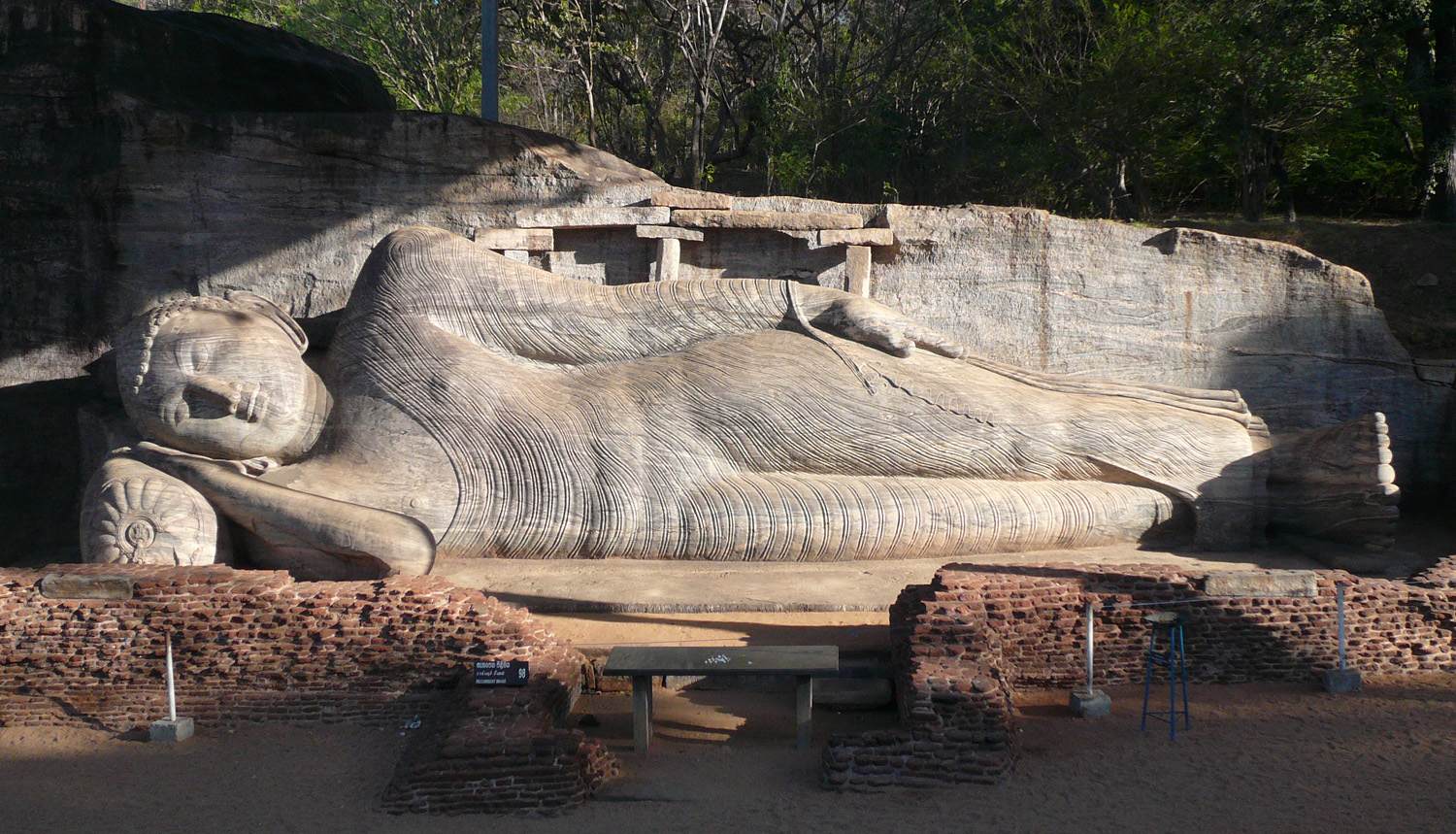
Reclining Buddha of Galvihara at Polonnaruwa (Sri Lanka, 12th century)

For Thai Buddha attitudes (Thai: ปางพระพุทธรูป; pang phra phut ta rup), the reclining Buddha (Thai: ปางไสยาสน์; pang sai yat) can refer to three different episodes, whilst the attribute of each remains unclear.

- Nirvana attitude (Thai: ปางปรินิพพาน; pang pari nipphan)
- Teaching the Rahu Asurin attitude (Thai: ปางโปรดอสุรินทราหู; pang prod asurintra hu)
- Sleeping attitude (Thai: ปางทรงพระสุบิน; pang song phra subin)

== Notable examples ==
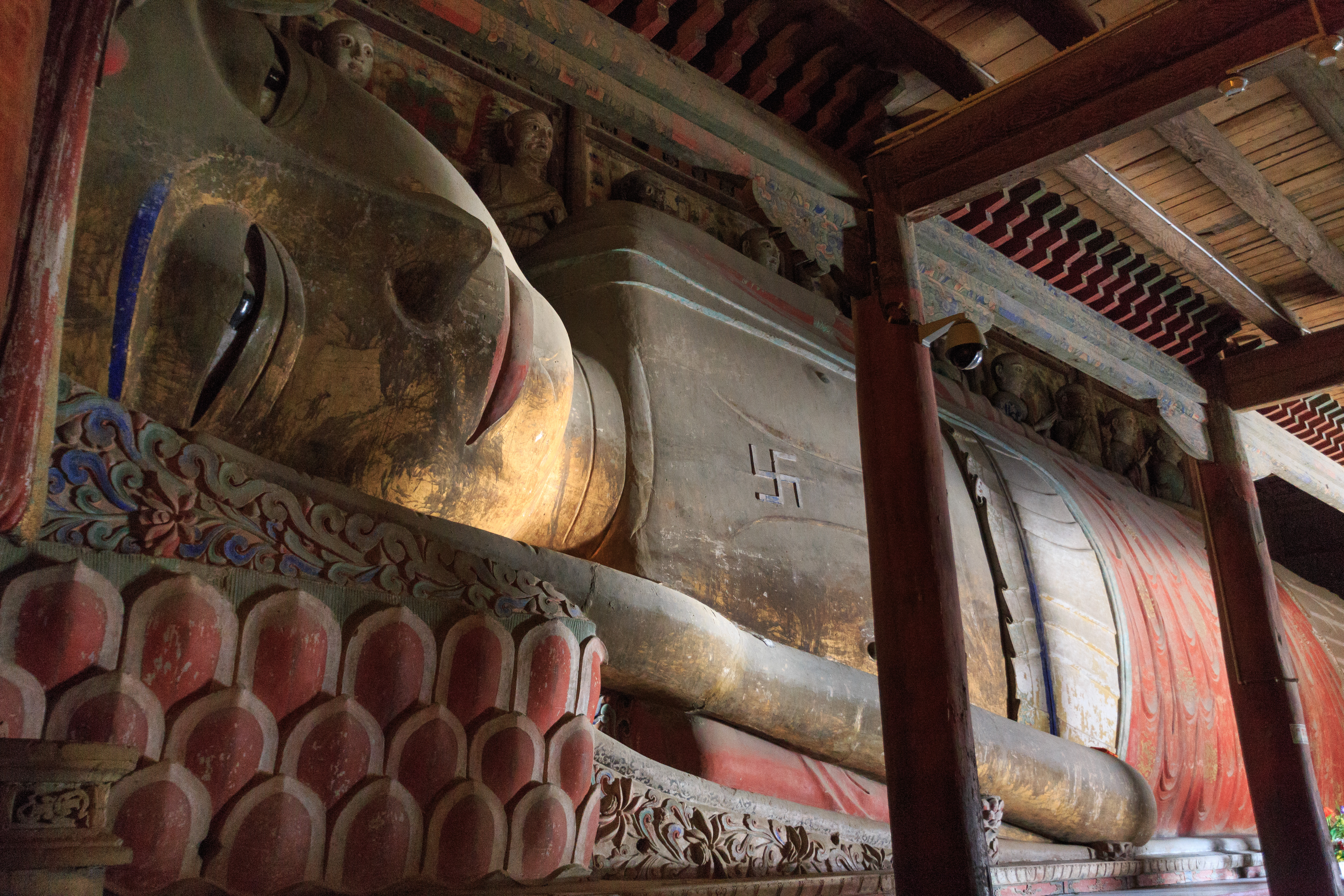
The reclining Buddha of Zhangye

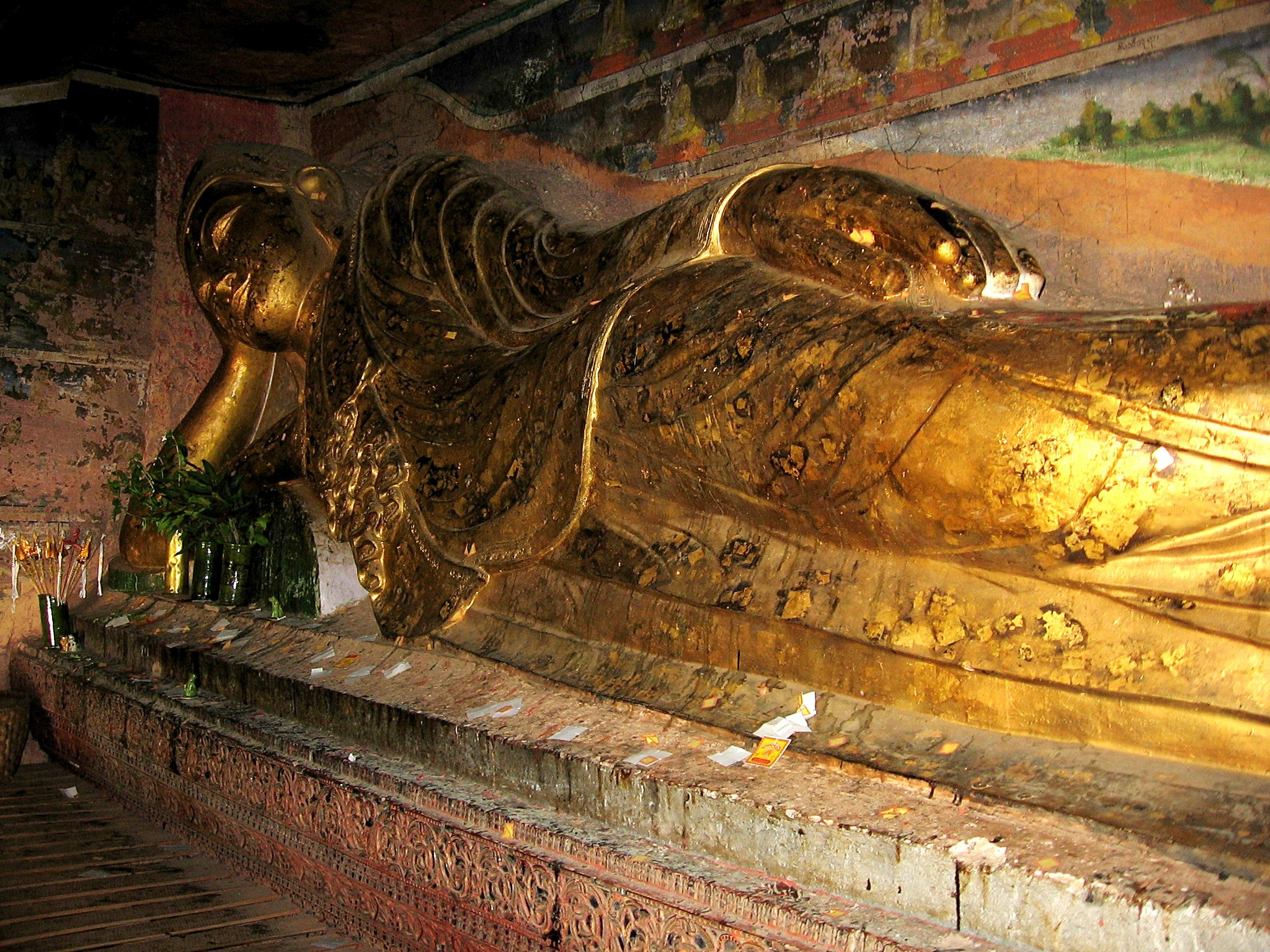
The reclining Buddha of the Hpo win caves

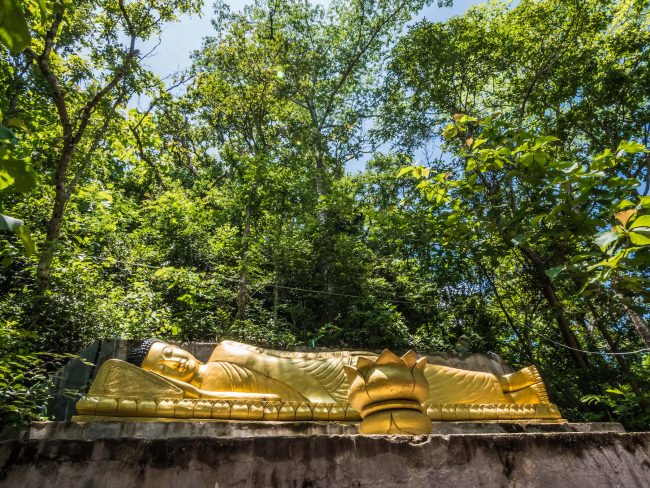
Golden gilded reclining Buddha at Sambok Mountain in Kratié, Cambodia

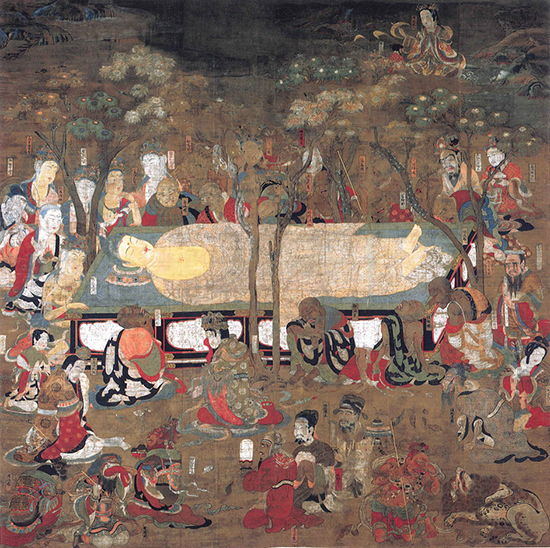
Butunehanzu (仏涅槃図) at Kongōbu-ji (Heian period)

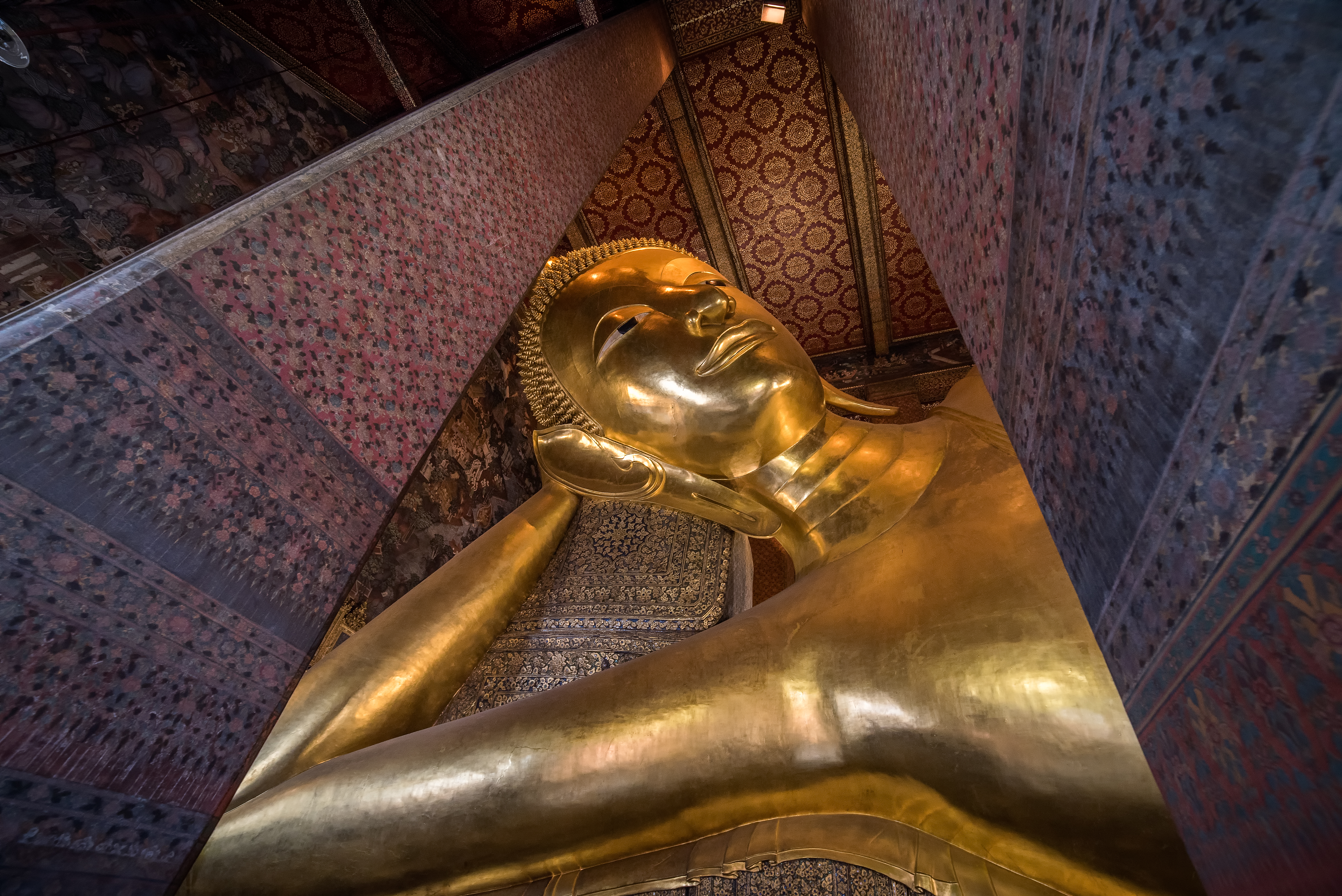
The reclining Buddha of Wat Pho

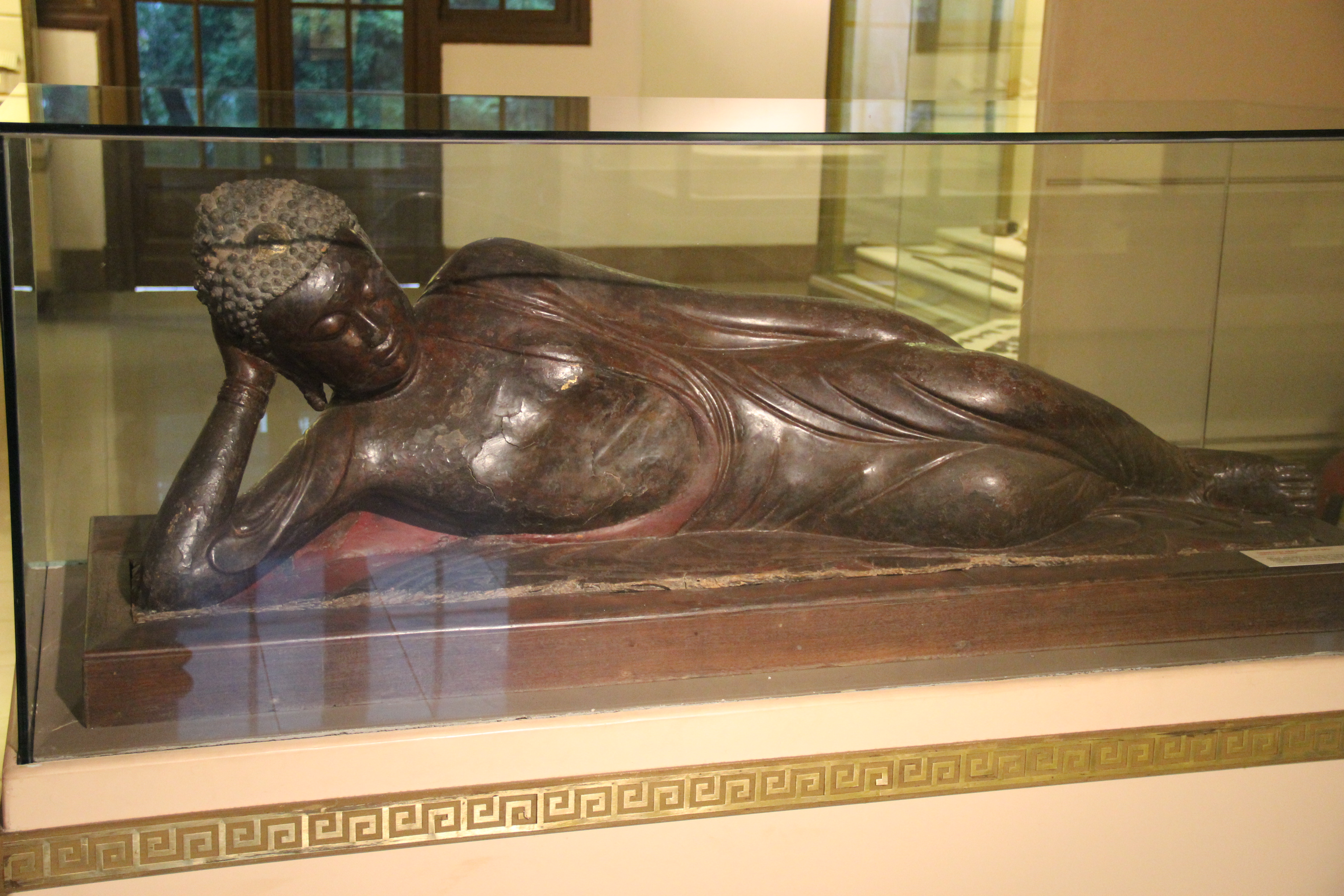
Reclining Buddha statue in the Revival Lê period

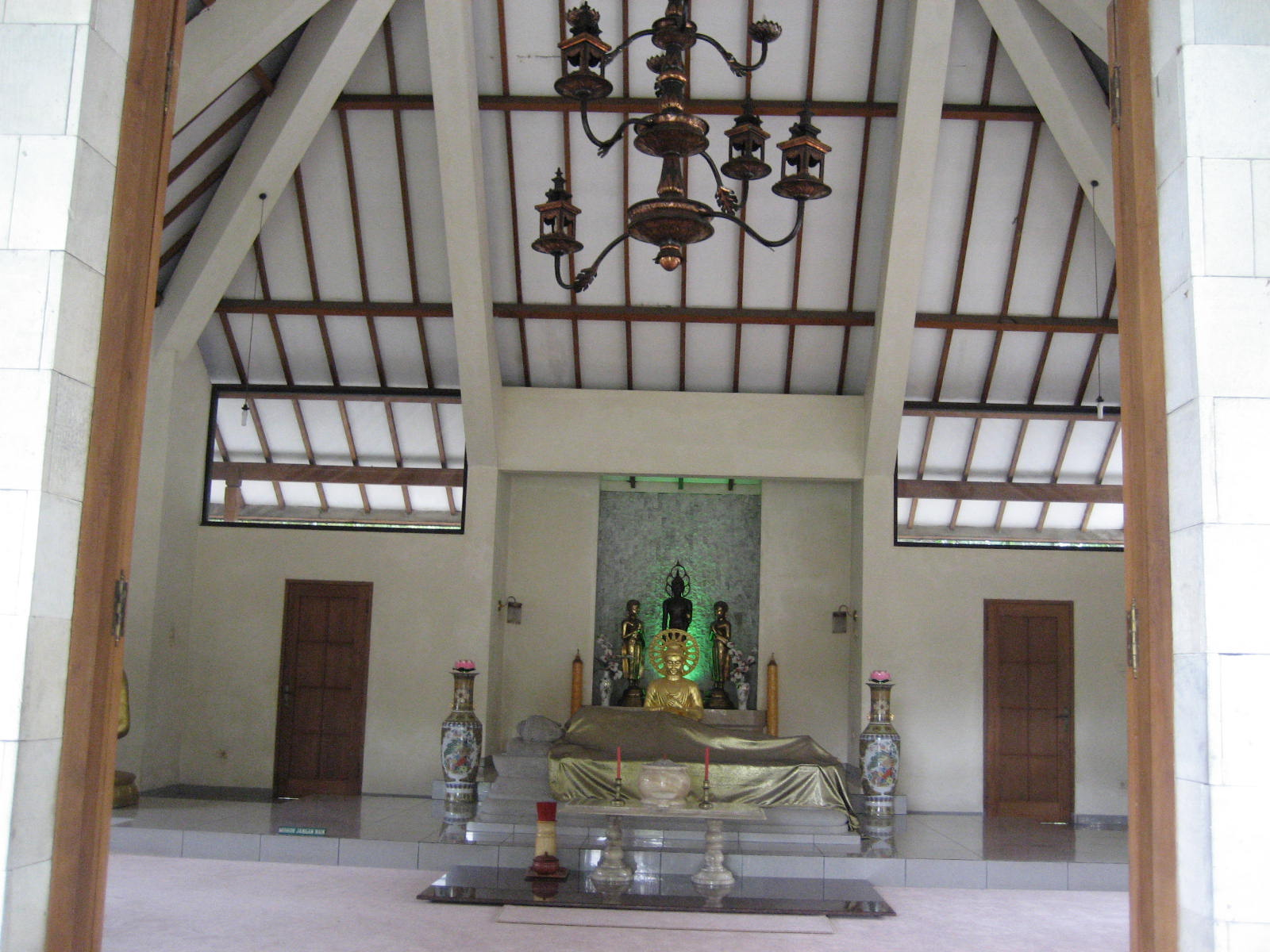
Reclining Buddha Statue in Mendut Temple complex, Indonesia.

Burma:

- Win Sein Tawya Buddha (Mawlamyaing) - 182.9 metres (600 ft)
- Thanboddhay Pagoda (Monywa) - 101 metres (331 ft)
- Myathalyaung Buddha (Bago) - 82 metres (269 ft)
- Lawka Tharahpu Buddha (Dawei) - 73.6 metres (241 ft)
- Chaukhtatgyi Buddha Temple (Yangon) - 66 metres (217 ft)
- Shwethalyaung Buddha (Bago) - 54.8 metres (180 ft)
- Manuha Temple (Bagan)
- Phowintaung, near Monywa

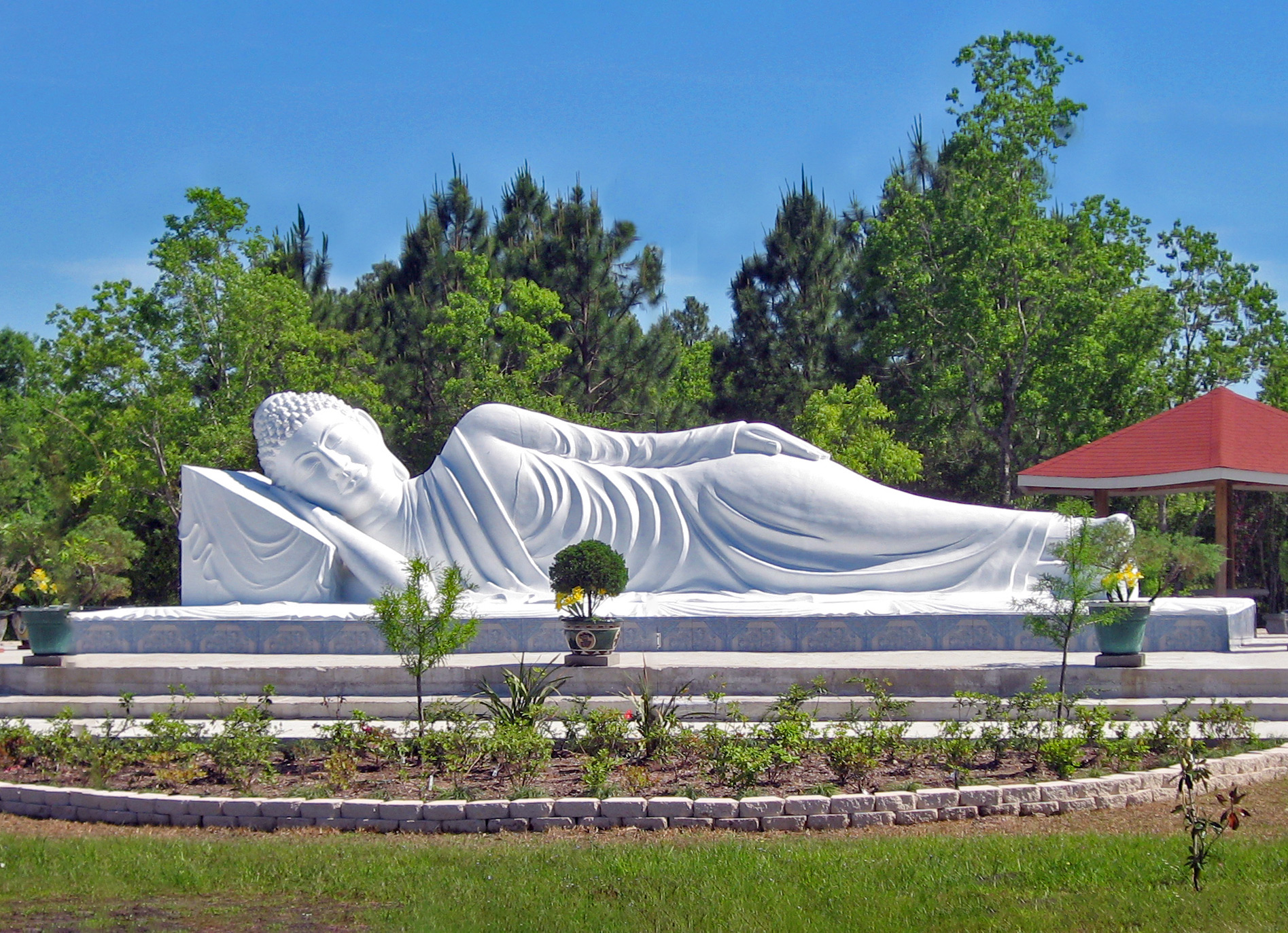
Reclining Buddha at Chua Linh-Son Buddhist Temple -- Santa Fe, Texas

Cambodia:

- West side of the Baphuon in Angkor
- Monolithic Buddha of the Phnom Kulen (lying on his left side)
- Golden gilded Buddha on Sambok Mountain in Kratié Province (on his right side)

China

- Dafo Temple, Zhangye

Pakistan:

- Bhamala Stupa contains a statue carbon dated to be 1,800 years old, making it the oldest reclining Buddha in the world.

India:

- Cave #26 of Ajanta

Indonesia:

- Maha Vihara Mojopahit, Trowulan, East Java.

Japan

- Kongōbu-ji at Mount Kōya.
- Nanzo-in, in Fukuoka Prefecture - 41 metres (135 ft)

Laos

- Buddha Park in Vientiane

Malaysia:

- Wat Chayamangkalaram in Pulau Tikus, Penang
- Sam Poh Tong Temple in Ipoh, Perak
- Wat Phothivihan in Tumpat, Kelantan

Sri Lanka:

- Dambulla
- Gal Vihara in Polonnaruwa (12th century)

Tajikistan:

- Buddha in Nirvana of Ajina-Tepa (13 meters long), on display in the National Museum in Dushanbe

Thailand:

- Wat Dhammachaksemaram in Nakhon Ratchasima - 13 metres (43 ft) the reclining Buddha of the 7th century in Dvaravati style coming from Muang Sema
- Wat Khun Inthapramun in Ang Thong - 50 metres (160 ft) an ancient temple that was constructed during the Sukhothai period
- Wat Lokkayasutha in Ayutthaya- 29 metres (95 ft) the biggest reclining Buddha in Ayuttaya
- Wat Pa Mok Worawihan in Ang Thong - 23 metres (75 ft) The reclining Buddha image was constructed during the Sukhothai period
- Wat Pho of Bangkok - 46 metres (151 ft)
- Wat Phra Kaeo in Kamphaeng Phet (15th century)
- Wat Phra Si Iriyabot in Kamphaeng Phet The 15th century temple with Buddha statues in four postures-walking, sitting, standing and reclining in the Sukhothai artistic style
- Wat Wichian Bamrung in Phetchabun - 50 metres (160 ft)
- Wat Thai Wattanaram in Mae Sot− 60 metres

United States

- Chua Linh-Son Buddhist Temple in Santa Fe, Texas

Vietnam:

- Hội Khánh Temple, Thủ Dầu Một, Bình Dương

== See also ==
- Reclining Liberty
- Reclining Vishnu
- Bhishma on bed of arrows
- list of tallest Buddha statues
