= The Young Rajah =

1922 film by Phil Rosen

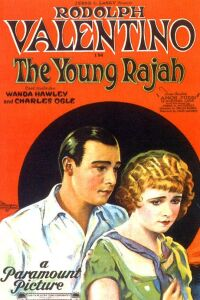
- 1922 theatrical poster
- Directed by: Phil Rosen
- Written by: John Ames Mitchell
- Screenplay by: June Mathis
- Based on: Amos Judd by John Ames Mitchell and play version by Alethea Luce
- Produced by: Jeffery Masino; Tracy Ryan Terhune
- Starring: Rudolph Valentino; Charles Ogle; Fanny Midgley; George Periolat; George Field
- Cinematography: James Van Trees
- Music by: Jon Mirsalis
- Production company: Famous Players–Lasky
- Distributed by: Paramount Pictures
- Release date: November 12, 1922
- Running time: 54 min - Eight reels (7705 feet)
- Country: United States
- Languages: Silent film English intertitles

The Young Rajah is a 1922 American silent romantic drama film directed by Phil Rosen and starring Rudolph Valentino. Based on the novel Amos Judd by John Ames Mitchell, the film follows an Indian prince raised in the United States who returns to his homeland and becomes entangled in political unrest and romantic conflict. Produced by Famous Players–Lasky and released by Paramount Pictures, The Young Rajah was Valentino’s final completed film before his 1923 strike against the studio.

Full movie

== Plot ==
After fifteen years, Joshua Judd tells his adopted son, Amos, that his real father was an Indian maharajah overthrown by Ali Khan. Amos, then a young boy, was rescued by General Devi Das Gadi and taken to America for his safety. (Joshua's merchant brother had been a trusted friend of the late maharajah.)

Amos attends Harvard University. There he incurs the hatred of Austin Slade, Jr., whom he beats out for a spot on the rowing team. At a party celebrating a rowing victory over arch-rival Yale, a jealous Slade calls Amos "yellow" and pours a drink on him, causing Amos to punch him. Slade grabs a chair as a weapon, but Amos ducks, and Slade falls through an open window to his death. Amos is cleared of all wrongdoing, but the newspaper story attracts the notice of Amhad Beg, Ali Khan's Prime Minister.

That summer, at a party hosted by close friend Stephen Van Kovert, Amos becomes attracted to one of the other guests, Molly Cabot. By chance, Molly and her family decide to vacation in Amos's hometown. As they become better acquainted, Amos overcomes Molly's initial dislike of him. However, Molly tells her father that she cannot marry someone who is not one of her "own people", however much she loves him. Instead, she agrees to marry longtime suitor Horace Bennett, who had been a good friend of Slade's. Bennett tells Amos to stay away from his future wife, but when he also calls Amos a murderer, Amos chokes him into apologizing. As he leaves, Amos is struck in the head by a rock thrown by Bennett. Seeing this, Molly rushes to Amos's side and breaks off her engagement to Bennett.

The happy couple decide on an early wedding, but Amos has a vision showing him being murdered the day before. He has had visions before; all came true, even if he tried to prevent them. His family is supposedly descended from Prince Arjuna; the god Krishna granted Arjuna and all his descendants the gift of prophecy. When he reveals this to his future father-in-law (who has already witnessed the accuracy of Amos's visions), the latter suggests he lock himself away in the sanatorium of a friend for the day.

Amos does so, but Amhad Beg and his men find and kidnap him. Just as they are about to kill him, Amos is rescued by the mystic Narada, who also can see into the future, and his followers. Narada convinces him to forgo his own happiness and return to India to overthrow the tyrant. When Amos is welcomed by his people and the army revolts, Ali Khan commits suicide. The new Maharajah of Dharmagar takes comfort in his latest vision, which shows his wedding to Molly.

== Cast ==
- Rudolph Valentino as Amos Judd
- Wanda Hawley as Molly Cabot
- Pat Moore as Amos as a Child
- Charles Ogle as Joshua Judd
- Fanny Midgley as Sarah Judd
- Robert Ober as Horace Bennett
- Jack Giddings as Austin Slade, Jr.
- Edward Jobson as John Cabot
- Josef Swickard as Narada
- Bertram Grassby as Maharajah Ali Khan
- J. Farrell MacDonald as Amhad Beg
- George Periolat as General Devi Das Gadi
- George Field as Prince Rajanya Paikparra Munsingh
- Maude Wayne as Miss Elsie Van Kovert
- William Boyd as Stephen Van Kovert
- Joseph Harrington as Dr. Fettiplace
- Spottiswoode Aitken as Caleb
- Julanne Johnston as Dancing Girl (uncredited)

== Reception ==
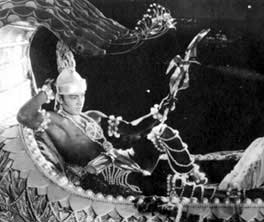
Valentino in a costume designed by Natacha Rambova.

This film was one of Valentino's most commercially and critically unsuccessful motion pictures. Photoplay described it as "The glamorous Rodolph Valentino's latest—and worst—vehicle."

Valentino expressed disappointment with The Young Rajah, the last film he completed before going on strike against Famous Players–Lasky. He stated that the dispute arose too late to prevent a production he felt fell below his standards, remarking, "I was terribly disappointed in it. I felt sick."

The film is perhaps best remembered today for its elaborate and suggestive costumes, which were designed by Valentino's wife Natacha Rambova. Photographs of Valentino wearing these outfits, some of which left little to the imagination, are still widely circulated today.

== Restored version ==
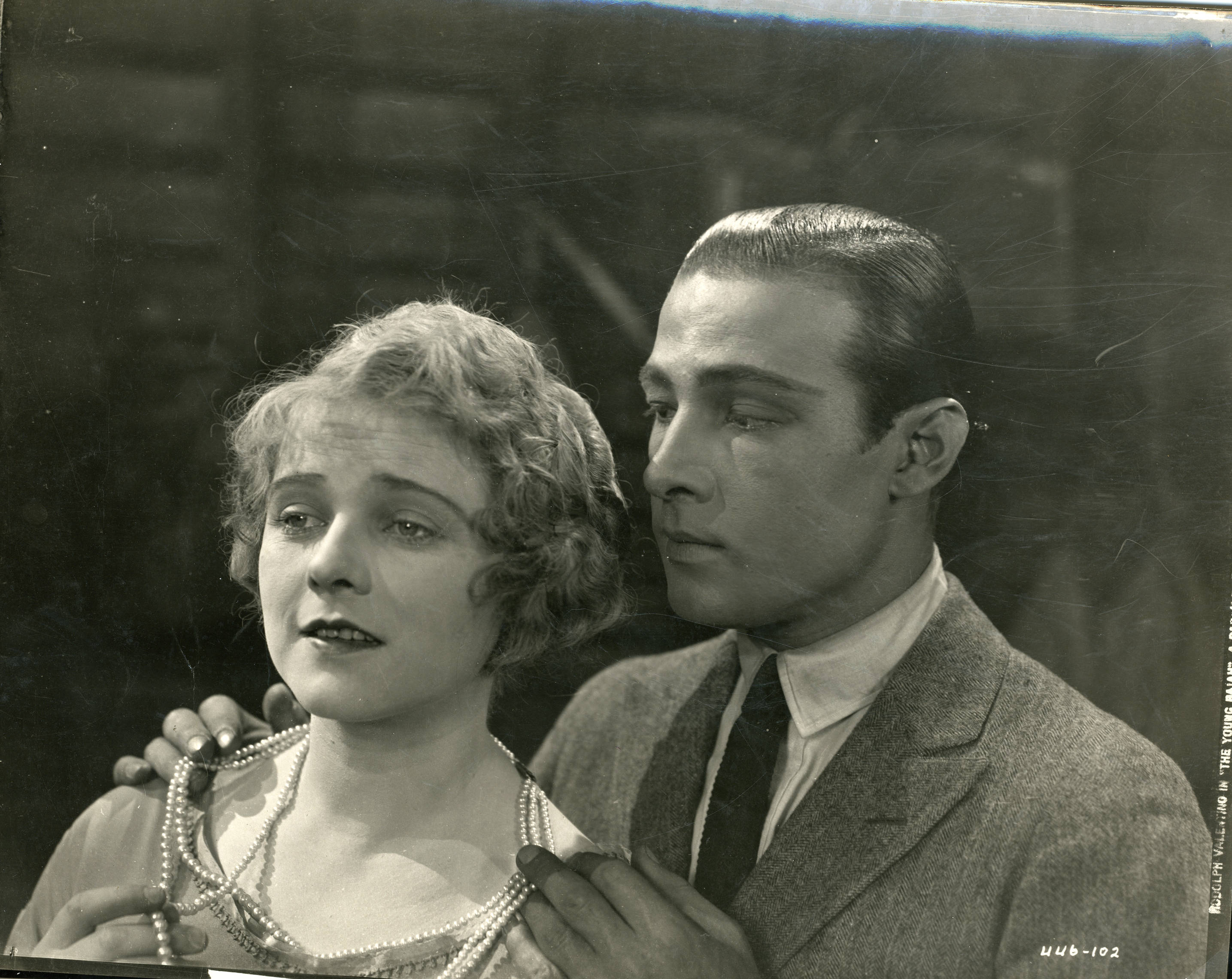
Film still of Wanda Hawley and Valentino in The Young Rajah

For most of the twentieth century, The Young Rajah was considered a lost film. However, in 2005, Turner Classic Movies announced that they were financing the restoration of the surviving footage of the picture, and the channel aired the resulting program in May 2006. The movie was assembled from poor-quality film clips and still photos, with additional title screens being added to bridge the gaps in the storyline. In addition, some intertitles were taken from a Spanish-language edition, and these were translated and replaced with new title screens.
