= Discovery Arcade (Disneyland Paris) =

Sheltered walkthrough area

Disneyland Park (Paris)
- Area: Main Street, U.S.A.
- Status: Operating
- Cost: Free With Admission
- Opening date: April 12, 1992

Ride statistics
- Attraction type: Walkthrough attraction
- Designer: Walt Disney Imagineering
- Wheelchair accessible

Discovery Arcade is a sheltered walkthrough area in Main Street, U.S.A. at Disneyland Paris. It is an exhibition about inventors of the 19th century, which opened with the park in 1992.

== Summary ==
The Arcade is a long walkway from Town Square to Edison Avenue, which also goes behind Main Street's shops and restaurants. It features many showcase windows, with each one displaying models and sketches from the U.S. Patent Office. These models were originally made in the 19th century. The arcade also presents a series of posters representing American cities of the late 20th century, as they were envisioned a century ago. The area provides shelter to guests during inclement weather.

== Development ==
When Imagineers were working on the creation of the European Disney resort, they had to envision a Main Street that would cope with the changing climate of the region of Paris. Although a huge Victorian-style glass roof covering the street could be built as in Tokyo Disneyland's World Bazaar, the decision was made to build two covered walkways parallel to Main Street instead.

In the very early days of Disneyland in Anaheim, Walt Disney had imagined two streets adjacent to Main Street, respectively named Liberty Street (themed to American values and history) and Edison Square (themed to this inventor's achievements). Although they were never made reality, these ideas became inspiration for both arcades in Paris. As such, Imagineers came up with Liberty Arcade, themed to the lasting friendship between France and the United States and embodied by Lady Liberty, and Discovery Arcade, themed to inventions of the 19th century.

== See also ==
- Liberty Arcade (Disneyland Paris)
