= Liberty Arcade (Disneyland Paris) =

Walkthrough area at Disneyland Paris

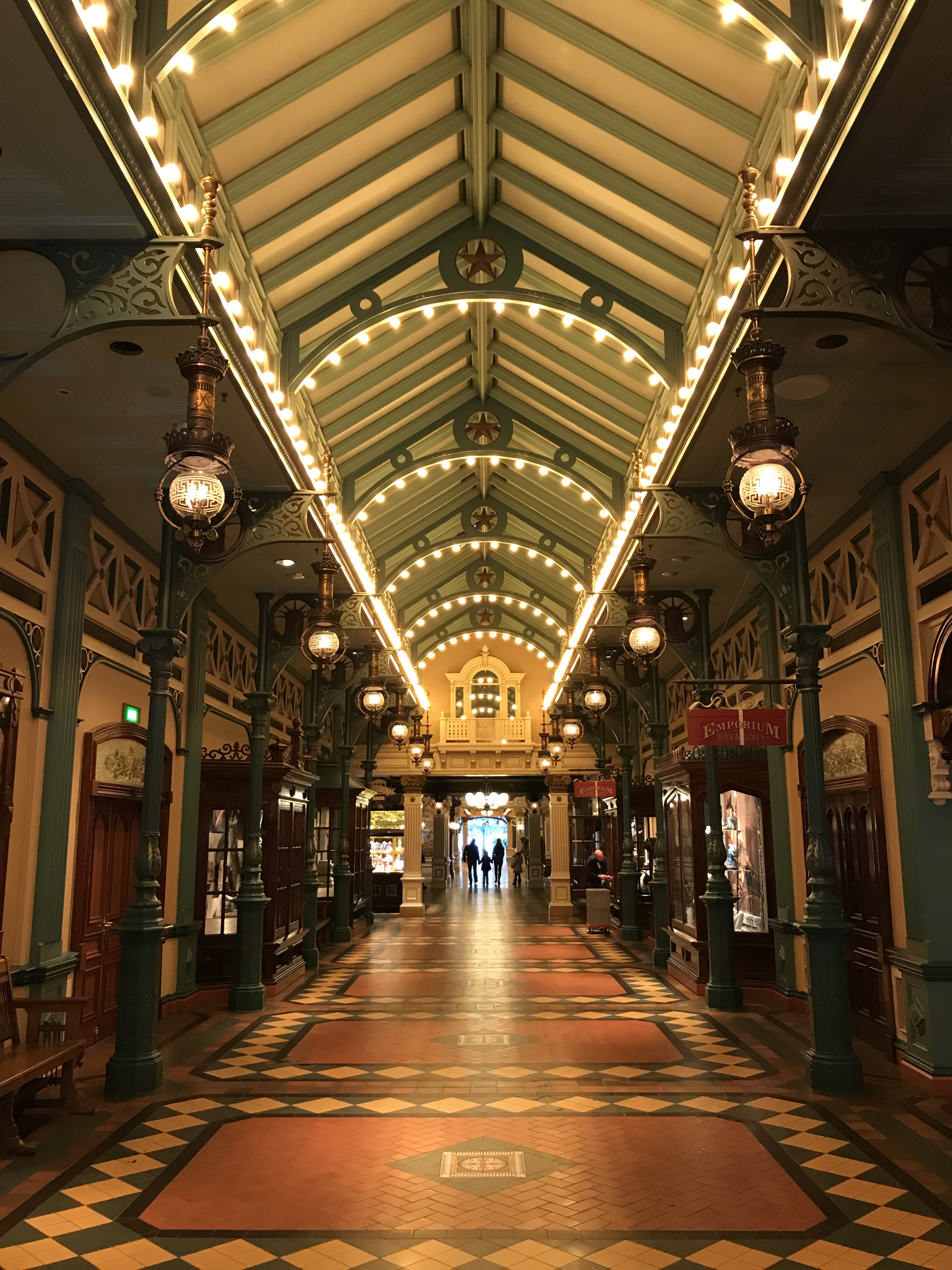

Disneyland Park (Paris)
- Area: Main Street, U.S.A.
- Status: Operating
- Opening date: April 12, 1992

Ride statistics
- Attraction type: Walkthrough attraction
- Designer: Walt Disney Imagineering
- Theme: Statue of Liberty
- Wheelchair accessible

Liberty Arcade is a covered walkthrough area in Main Street, U.S.A. at Disneyland Paris. It is an exhibition about the Statue of Liberty (Liberty Enlightening the World), and a walkway parallel to the main entrance. It opened with the park in 1992.

== Summary ==
The Arcade is a long walkway, from Town Square to Central Plaza, which takes guests behind Main Street's shops and restaurants. It is divided into three parts: The first is an exhibition presenting the making of the statue by Frédéric Auguste Bartholdi and Gustave Eiffel. Showcase windows, paintings and rare items are displayed. The second part, known as Liberty Court, is the central part of the Arcade. This rotunda, ornamented with American and French flags and Victorian paintings promoting the Statue's dedication ceremony, is accompanied by a dark room. In this dark room, guests can behold, through a glass window, a recreation of the inauguration of the Statue of Liberty, complete with wax figures commenting on the event and the recording of U.S. President Grover Cleveland's speech. The third part resembles the first one, but deals with the statue becoming a World symbol. Showcase windows present Ellis Island, or the rededication of the statue in 1986. The area provides shelter to guests during inclement weather.

== Development ==
When Imagineers were working on the creation of the European Disney resort, they had to envision a Main Street that would cope with the changing climate of the region of Paris. Although a huge Victorian-style glass roof covering the street could be built as in Tokyo Disneyland, the decision was made to build two covered walkways parallel to Main Street instead.

In the very early days of Disneyland in Anaheim, Walt Disney had imagined two streets adjacent to Main Street, respectively named Liberty Street (themed to American values and history) and Edison Square (themed to this inventor's achievements). Although they were never made reality, these ideas became inspiration for both Arcades in Paris. As such, Imagineers came up with Liberty Arcade, themed to the lasting friendship between France and the United States and embodied by Statue of Liberty, and Discovery Arcade, themed to inventions of the 19th Century.

== See also ==
- Discovery Arcade (Disneyland Paris)
