= Statue of Liberty (Warhol) =

Andy Warhol painting

- Artist: Andy Warhol
- Year: 1962
- Medium: Silkscreen inks, spray enamel and graphite on canvas
- Movement: Pop Art
- Subject: Statue of Liberty
- Dimensions: 197.5 cm × 205.7 cm (77.8 in × 81.0 in)

Statue of Liberty is a 1962 painting by American artist Andy Warhol. It depicts the Statue of Liberty (Liberty Enlightening the World), a symbol of freedom and the United States. Based on a commercially produced postcard, the silkscreen painting repeats the monument in a grid of offset red and green impressions, creating a stereoscopic three-dimensional effect. In 2012, it sold at auction for $43.8 million.

== Background ==
By 1962, Pop artist Andy Warhol turned to images of widely recognized American symbols such as Campbell's Soup cans, Coca-Cola, and dollar bills, abandoning hand-painted comic-strip imagery in favor of subjects drawn from advertising, newspapers, and other forms of mass communication. The Statue of Liberty represented an ideal Pop subject: a universally recognizable image that functioned simultaneously as a patriotic emblem and tourist attraction.

The dating of Statue of Liberty has remained inconsistent in the literature. Historically, museums and scholarly publications identified the painting as dating from 1963. More recently, however, auction houses have dated the work as 1962. Another version of Statue of Liberty at the Andy Warhol Museum is also dated as 1962.

== Technique and production ==
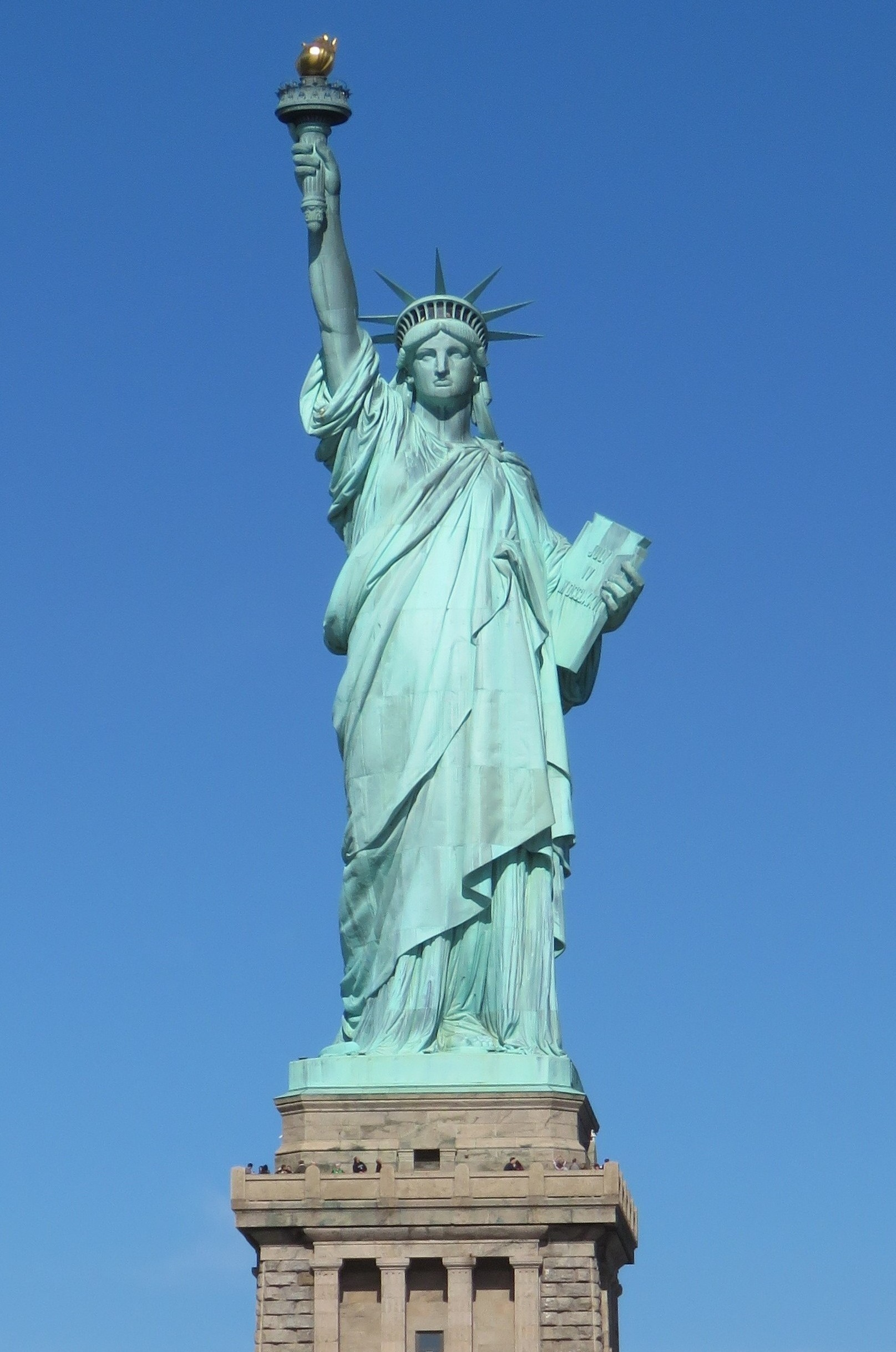
The Statue of Liberty (Liberty Enlightening the World) in New York Harbor

The image Warhol used for Statue of Liberty derives from a commercially printed postcard, which he enlarged and repeated 24 times across the canvas in a grid. He then silkscreened the image in slightly offset green and red, creating a stereoscopic effect. When viewed through red-and-green 3D glasses, the offset images create the illusion of depth. As Brett Gorvy, former chairman and international head of postwar and contemporary art at Christie's, explained, "If you put on 3-D glasses, it becomes a grainy, black and white 3-D photograph."

Warhol produced at least two Statue of Liberty paintings as part of a small group of works from the early 1960s that explored anaglyphic 3D imagery. Other examples include Album of a Mat Queen (1962), Patty Oldenburg (1962), and Optical Car Crash (1963).

== Description ==
Measuring 77¾ × 81 inches, the painting exhibits variations in the density of the silkscreen ink and slight differences in the registration of each impression create subtle changes among the repeated red and green images. In some impressions, the overlapping colors produce negative-like effects, while uneven layers of ink in the background create abstract forms that partially obscure the monument. These irregularities reflect Warhol's use of mechanical reproduction while allowing chance variations in the printing process to become part of the finished work.

A slightly smaller Statue of Liberty, measuring 80 × 61 inches, differs in its composition and printing. The silkscreen impressions do not cover the entire canvas, leaving a section of blank space along the left edge. The impressions are predominantly green rather than red, with greater variation in their density than in the larger version.

== Interpretation ==
Art historian Sidra Stich interpreted Statue of Liberty as an exploration of how mass reproduction transforms cultural symbols. She argued that Warhol's repeated image both magnifies and diminishes the monument's significance, observing that widely reproduced landmarks become instantly recognizable through postcards, advertisements, and other forms of mass media while simultaneously becoming "neutralized entities devoid of affective value."

Similarly, academic Timothy W. Luke argued that Warhol's Statue of Liberty exemplifies how civic symbols become "standardized, replicable, neutral signs with little intrinsic symbolic content" once detached from their "highly charged political context."

== Auction history ==
In November 2012, Statue of Liberty, measuring 77¾ x 81 inches, sold for $43.8 million at Christie's in New York.

== See also ==
- 1962 in art
