= The Last American (novel) =

1889 novel by John Ames Mitchell

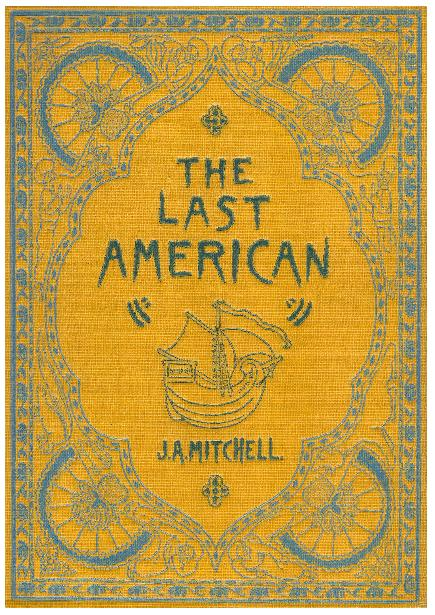
- Cover of the 1893 edition
- Author: John Ames Mitchell
- Language: English
- Genre: Science fiction
- Published: 1889 (A. Stokes & Brother)

The Last American is a short illustrated future history novel by John Ames Mitchell (1845–1918). First published in 1889, the novel is the fictional journal of a Persian explorer named Khan-Li, who sails across the Atlantic in 2951 and rediscovers America. Most of the narrative consists of a satirical and unflattering view of late 19th-century American society through the eyes of the Persians, who are simultaneously impressed by its grandeur and contemptuous of social developments Mitchell did not approve of, such as the equality of the sexes and the presence in America of the Irish. This book is among the anti-utopian disaster literature published in the late 19th century,

== Overview ==
Beginning around 1960, the world was devastated by drastic climatic changes, with North America becoming virtually uninhabitable; these had later partially reversed themselves, though the Persian explorers find the East Coast at the latitude of New York unbearably hot. The Irish apparently came to dominate America after a "Massacre of the Protestants" in 1927. During its final decades, the US had been ruled by a "Murphy Dynasty", explaining the Persians' discovery of a late coin from 1957 bearing a harp on one side and the portrait of an Irish dictator on the other.

The 1893 edition is a small hardcover book with 78 numbered pages. It is illustrated with half-page etchings inserted into the text and a few full-page etchings. One shows a reconstructed street scene with "costumes and manner of riding... taken from metal plates now in the museum at Teheran"; clearly indicating newspaper advertisements from a print shop. Another, "The Wooden God," is a cigar store Indian; and "The Ruins of the Great Temple" shows a devastated Capitol Building.

== Analysis ==
The book is, on the one hand, a satirical look at ways and customs of the United States as reconstructed from the ruins and the Persians' own spotty histories of the long-past era. It also seems to be a spoof of the archaeological discoveries that were being made at the time. All of the Persians have farcical names (Nōz-yt-ahl is the name of a historian, for example) and often speak in breathless wonder at what they see.

The Last American is among the anti-utopian disaster literature published in the late 19th century, along with Ignatius Donnelly's Caesar's Column and Park Benjamin Jr.'s The End of New York.

Montesquieu's Persian Letters may have provided some degree of inspiration. In its own turn, the book seems to have been a rough model for Aldous Huxley's Ape and Essence.

== Dedication ==
The dedication on the novella changed between the first edition in 1889 and the edition of 1902: the first through eighth editions have the following dedication:

TO THE AMERICAN WHO IS MORE THAN SATISFIED WITH HIMSELF AND HIS COUNTRY THIS VOLUME IS AFFECTIONATELY DEDICATED.

...In the 1902 edition, this was changed to:

TO THOSE THOUGHTFUL PERSIANS WHO CAN READ A WARNING IN THE SUDDEN RISE AND SWIFT EXTINCTION OF A FOOLISH PEOPLE THIS VOLUME IS DEDICATED
