= John Ames Mitchell =

American novelist and co-founder of Life magazine (1845–1918)

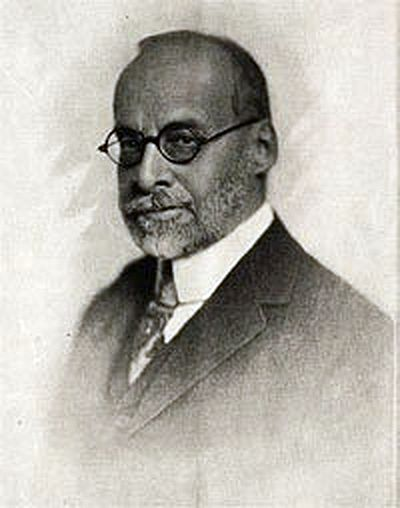
- Born: January 17, 1845; New York, New York
- Died: June 29, 1918 (aged 73); Ridgefield, Connecticut
- Education: Harvard University
- Occupations: Publisher; architect; artist; novelist
- Known for: Co-founder and editor of original Life Magazine; founded the Fresh Air Fund
- Notable work: Unity Church of North Easton (architect)
- Parent(s): Asa Mitchell, Harriet Ames (1819-1896)
- Relatives: Oliver Ames, Sr. (grandfather)

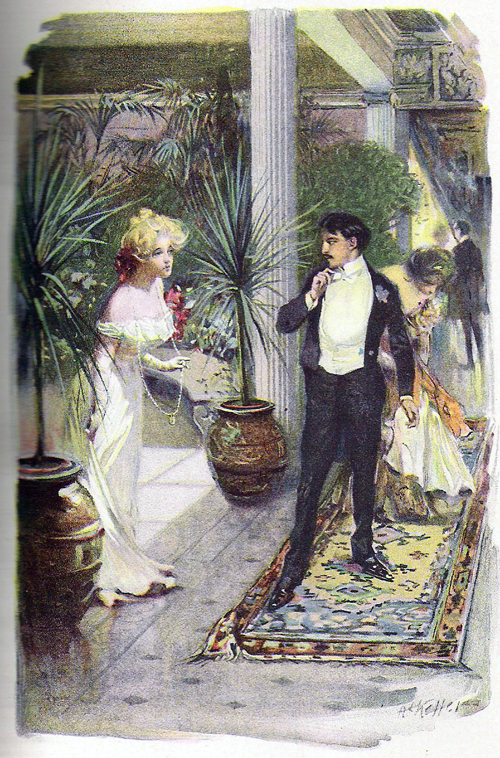
An illustration by A. I. Keller from the 1901 edition of Amos Judd by John Ames Mitchell

John Ames Mitchell (January 17, 1845 – June 29, 1918) was an American publisher, architect, artist and novelist. He was co-founder, editor, and publisher of the original Life magazine, in which he was a contributing artist, and the author of several novels.

== Biography ==
John Ames Mitchell was born in New York City on January 17, 1845. He was a Harvard University educated architect who studied at the École nationale supérieure des Beaux-Arts in Paris. In 1883 he co-founded Life magazine with Andrew Miller. Serving as president, Mitchell held a 75 percent interest in the magazine with the remainder by Miller in his job as secretary-treasurer. Both men retained their holdings until their deaths. Much more like today's New Yorker than the Life of the later 20th century, Mitchell's magazine discovered and encouraged many fine writers and artists at the turn of the century, such as Charles Dana Gibson, the illustrator who created the Gibson Girl. It covered the literary scene as well as political and social issues. He and Horace Greeley of the New York Herald Tribune founded the Fresh Air Fund, which for many years operated the Life Fresh Air camp for city kids on the site of today's Branchville School in Ridgefield, Connecticut, the town in which Mitchell also lived.

In 1875, Ames was hired by his uncle, Oliver Ames Jr., to design the Unity Church of North Easton.

Mitchell penned a half dozen novels. The Last American, a fictional journal about a Persian admiral who rediscovers America in the year 2951, was published in 1889. Amos Judd (1895) was made into the 1922 silent film, The Young Rajah, starring Rudolph Valentino. Life was purchased in 1936 by another Ridgefield resident, Henry Luce, who turned it into a picture-oriented magazine. The headquarters of Mitchell's Life is now the Herald Square Hotel in New York, a gift to Mitchell from Charles Dana Gibson in appreciation of the publisher's having seen and developed his potential as an artist.

== Death and burial ==
Mitchell died suddenly on June 29, 1918, at his home in Ridgefield, Connecticut, of apoplexy. He is buried in Fairlawn Cemetery in Ridgefield. Windover, his estate, was subdivided years ago, but the main house is still on West Lane. Its owner also operates the Herald Square Hotel, once Mitchell's Life headquarters.

== See also ==
- Ames family
