= 1976 Wichita Holiday Inn shooting =

Mass shooting in Kansas, US

Wichita Holiday Inn shooting
- Location: Wichita, Kansas, US
- Date: August 11, 1976
- Attack type: Mass shooting, murder
- Weapon: .30-30 rifle
- Deaths: 3
- Injuries: 9 (including the perpetrator)
- Perpetrators: Michael Ray Soles, 19
- Verdict: Guilty on all counts
- Convictions: First-degree murder (x3); Aggravated battery (x7); Aggravated burglary Aggravated assault against a law enforcement officer
- Sentence: Three consecutive life sentences with the possibility of parole after 15 years

On August 11, 1976, in Wichita, Kansas, United States, a 19-year-old man used a rifle to shoot multiple people on the street from the 26th floor of a Holiday Inn hotel. The shooting resulted in the deaths of three people and injuries to eight others. The shooter, Michael Ray Soles (born June 22, 1957), was wounded by the police and arrested at the scene, and he was charged with multiple counts of first-degree murder and aggravated battery. Soles, who became known as the Holiday Inn Sniper, was found guilty and sentenced to life imprisonment. As of 2026, he remains incarcerated at the Winfield Correctional Facility.

== Shooting ==
On August 11, 1976, in Wichita, Kansas, Michael Ray Soles, a 19-year-old teenager from Sand Springs, Oklahoma, entered the Holiday Inn building, the tallest building in Kansas. At that time, Soles was upset about losing his girlfriend, and this prompted him to drive to the hotel in downtown Wichita. Soles was armed with his 30-30 rifle, an extra gun and some self-made ammunition. Soles also stopped along the way to buy more ammunition.

After reaching the hotel, Soles parked his car and went up to the rooftop with his guns and ammunition. However, the rooftop was inaccessible, and Soles thus headed to the 26th floor, where he forced a maid to leave one of the rooms before he went in alone, locking the door behind him. Soles loaded his rifle and began to shoot multiple times out of the window toward the street below. The shooting resulted in the deaths of two people, 57-year-old glass company employee Elmer W. Hensley and 56-year-old freelance news photographer Joseph Goulart. Another eight people were injured during the shooting. According to Dr. Robert Hemphill, the Sedgwick County deputy coroner who performed an autopsy on both men, confirmed that both Hensley and Goulart died as a result of single gunshot wounds; one of them was shot in the back while the other was shot in the chest.

Subsequently, officers from the Wichita Police Department responded within minutes to reports of gunfire in downtown Wichita, and they managed to discover the hotel room in which Soles fired the shots. 34-year-old police lieutenant Mike Hill, who was accompanied by Officers Jerry Carter and Hank Salmans, entered the adjacent room to access the shared balcony area. Hill managed to aim his 12-gauge shotgun and fired through the glass and partition separating the balconies, wounding Soles before he could shoot more people. Hill and Salmans would continue shoot at Soles, who continued attempting to aim. Soles ultimately surrendered to the police after being wounded in the legs and feet. The shooting itself lasted a total of 11 minutes.

The wounded victims of the attack were later rushed to hospital for treatment. One of the injured victims, 23-year-old Mark Falen, died of a gunshot wound to the neck at St. Francis Hospital on August 13, 1976, thus becoming the third deceased victim in the shooting. As for the remaining casualties, four of them were discharged the day after receiving treatment, while two other people remained hospitalized with gunshot wounds. In total, eleven people were shot, including the deceased victims Hensley, Goulart and Falen. The injured victims were Larry Ade, Arnold Merritt, Janice Goodwin, Forrest Hudlin, Denise Guseman, Penny Guseman, Steven Morgan and Chris Hoy.

== Murder trial of Michael Soles ==
Michael Soles, who became infamously known as the "Holiday Inn Sniper", was charged with three counts of premeditated murder, seven counts of aggravated battery, one count of aggravated burglary and one count of aggravated assault against a law enforcement officer.

The trial of Soles was originally scheduled for October 25, 1976, but the trial date was postponed to November 15, 1976, to allow more time to await psychiatric test results for the defence. The trial date was later pushed back to December 6, 1976.

On December 6, 1976, Soles's murder trial began at the Sedgwick County District Court, and jury selection commenced on that same day. During the trial, the prosecution argued that Soles's motive was to get back at the world and seek attention after facing the loss of his girlfriend, while the defense argued that Soles, who pleaded not guilty by reason of insanity, was tormented by a split personality with an "untamed tiger" that surfaced during the times of stress in Soles's life.

On January 14, 1977, the jury found Soles guilty of three counts of first-degree murder, seven counts of aggravated battery, one count of aggravated burglary and one count of aggravated assault on a law enforcement officer. For the most serious charges of first-degree murder, life imprisonment was the mandatory sentence under Kansas state law. At the time of Soles's conviction, the state of Kansas did not have the death penalty for murder, given that the state outlawed the practice four years prior in 1972. Capital punishment was not re-introduced in Kansas until 1994, 18 years after the mass shooting.

On January 28, 1977, Sedgwick County District Court Judge Tom Raum sentenced Soles to three consecutive life sentences for all three counts of murder, in addition to consecutive terms of 5-to-20 years on each of seven counts of aggravated battery, one count of an aggravated burglary and one count of aggravated assault on a law enforcement officer.

In the aftermath of his trial, Michael Soles filed an appeal to the Kansas Supreme Court. On October 28, 1978, the Kansas Supreme Court upheld Soles's conviction and dismissed his appeal.

== Imprisonment ==
After his sentencing, Michael Soles was transferred to the Hutchinson Correctional Facility on February 2, 1977, where he began to serve his life sentences for the shooting. Since then, Soles had been transferred multiple times between several prisons in Kansas, one of which was the El Dorado Correctional Facility, a maximum security prison where Soles was incarcerated from 1998 to 2020. As of 2026, Soles is serving his life term at the Winfield Correctional Facility.

During his incarceration, Soles had completed two offender skills programs. The first was building maintenance, which he completed on October 31, 1991, and the other was industries technology, which was completed on December 23, 1994. Between 1997 and 2018, Soles had seven prison disciplinary violations, which consisted of fighting, disobeying orders, possession of dangerous contraband, work performance and misuse of state property.

Under Kansas state law prior to its 1978 amendment, life imprisonment carried the possibility of parole after a minimum of 15 years. Given that Soles was sentenced prior to 1978, he became eligible for parole in June 1991, even though he had been given three consecutive life terms. When it was announced that both Soles and the notorious serial killer Francis Nemechek would attend their initial parole hearings, the news sparked intense public backlash, as both men had been convicted of some of Kansas's most infamous crimes. Nemechek had been sentenced to life for murdering four women and one boy. Survivors and family members of the victims petitioned the state parole board to deny Soles's release, joined by relatives of Nemechek's five victims. In July 1991, Soles was denied parole for the first time.

In July 1994, three years after he was first denied parole, Soles was reviewed for parole a second time, and the families of the victims opposed releasing Soles in light of the serious nature of his crimes. Soles was subsequently denied parole a second time. After the rejection of his parole, Soles appealed to Governor Joan Finney for clemency, with hopes of commuting his sentence. However, the appeal attracted the opposition from the August 11 Council, a group formed to fight for victim's rights and to oppose the possibility of release for Soles.

In June 1997, a third parole hearing was scheduled for Soles. However, Soles's parole application was refused for the third time. In July 1998, one year after Soles was denied parole, a victims' rights law took effect mandating that inmates serving life sentences be reviewed for parole every ten years after completing the minimum required portion of their sentence.

In May 2007, Soles's fourth parole hearing took place, and during the hearing, the surviving victims and their families appealed to the parole board to not release Soles and keep him locked away for life. At that point in time, Soles was one of at least 22 prisoners who had served more than 30 years out of their respective life sentences in Kansas. Ultimately, Soles was denied parole for the fourth time, and he was ordered to remain behind bars for another ten years.

In May 2017, a fifth parole hearing was scheduled for Soles ten years after his fourth parole rejection. Former Sedgwick County Sheriff Mike Hill and former Sedgwick County District Court judge Keith Sanborn (who was the original trial prosecutor) appeared in the parole hearing, and they both urged the parole board to not release Soles. Two months later, the Kansas Prisoner Review Board refused parole for Soles the fifth time in July 2017. The board cited the seriousness of the offenses, the extent of violence exhibited and the objections to Soles's release, and therefore ordered that Soles be further incarcerated until 2027, the year when he will get his sixth parole hearing.

By February 2026, Soles ranked among the seven longest-serving inmates in Kansas. Having been incarcerated since February 2, 1977, he was the third longest-serving prisoner in the state, surpassed only by Michael D. Pyle (1972) and Charles J. Wey (September 6, 1973).

== Aftermath ==
The Wichita Holiday Inn shooting was regarded as one of Kansas's high-profile murder cases.

The 1976 Holiday Inn shooting was one of three most notable mass shooting incidents where the shooter opened fire at their victims from a high floor or rooftop of a building. One of them was the 1966 University of Texas tower shooting, where Marine veteran Charles Whitman shot and killed 15 people from atop the tower, while the other was the 2017 Las Vegas shooting, where 64-year-old Stephen Paddock opened fire from the 32nd-floor of the hotel, killing 60 people and wounding at least 413 others.

In June 1978, nearly two years after the shooting, the surviving victims of the attack filed a lawsuit, suing the Holiday Inn on the grounds that the hotel personnel were negligent in allowing Soles to enter the premises with firearms that were used in the shooting. Ultimately, in 1981, a judge ruled the owners of the Holiday Inn were not responsible for the shooting attack and hence dismissed the lawsuit.

Keith Sanborn (April 27, 1922 – August 1, 2022), the District Attorney who prosecuted Soles back in 1976 for the mass shooting, would become a judge in 1980, four years after the incident. He retired at the age of 70 in 1993, and he died at the age of 100 on August 1, 2022. The Holiday Inn Sniper case was one of Sanborn's most notable cases during his career as a prosecutor.

== See also ==
- List of mass shootings in the United States (1900–1999)
