= Shelby bookstore murders =

1987 mass shooting in North Carolina, United States

- Part of mass shootings in the United States and violence against LGBT people in the United States
- Location: Shelby, North Carolina, U.S.
- Date: January 17, 1987
- Target: Shelby III Bookstore
- Attack type: Mass shooting, arson
- Weapons: .22 LR and .45 ACP firearms, gasoline
- Deaths: 3
- Injuries: 2
- Accused: Douglas Sheets, Robert Jackson
- Verdict: Not guilty (Sheets), charges dropped (Jackson)

On the night of January 17, 1987, three men were killed and two more were seriously wounded in a mass shooting at the Shelby III Bookstore in Shelby, North Carolina. The bookstore was an adult bookstore that was known to attract a gay male clientele. In November 1987, Douglas Lawrence Sheets and Robert Eugene Jackson, two followers of white supremacist leader Frazier Glenn Miller Jr., were indicted for the murders after Miller claimed the two had told him they committed the shooting. Sheets was tried and acquitted for the murders in 1989 and charges were dropped against Jackson after Sheets' acquittal. As of 2024, the murders are officially unsolved.

== Shootings ==
On January 17, 1987, three or four masked gunmen entered the Shelby III Bookstore in Shelby, North Carolina, an adult bookstore that was known to attract gay male customers. The gunmen ordered the five men inside the store to lay face-down on the floor before shooting them in the head. Three of the men: 19-year-old Travis Melton, 29-year-old Kenneth Godfrey and 26-year-old Paul Weston were killed. The two other men, James Parris and Jon Anthony, survived with serious injuries.

Before the gunmen fled the scene, they stole from the store's cash register and rigged gasoline-filled plastic jugs with detonators and set the bookstore on fire. Parris and Anthony managed to escape the bookstore as the fire began to spread. Parris and Anthony reached their vehicles and were able to alert a passing motorist on U.S. Route 74 to call police.

== Investigation ==
Initially law enforcement investigated a number of possible motives for shooting, including a mafia-hit, a business dispute or a crime of passion involving a jilted ex-lover of one of the men. Authorities later turned their attention to Frazier Glenn Miller Jr., leader of the North Carolina-based White Patriot Party (WPP). On April 6, 1987, Miller and the WPP declared war on the United States federal government. Weeks later on April 30, Miller as well as Douglas Lawrence Sheets, Robert Eugene Jackson and Anthony Wydra were arrested at a mobile home in Ozark, Missouri. Inside the mobile home was a large cache weapons that included C-4 and dynamite explosives, automatic assault rifles and a half-ton of ammunition. Not long after his arrest, Miller gave a statement to police implicating Sheets and Jackson in the murders. Sheets and Jackson were indicted for the murders in November 1987. Two other WPP associates, Hugh Black and Jeff Johnston, were also implicated in the shooting by Miller and another WPP member, Robert Stoner, though neither were charged in the attack. Black spent 16 months in jail for refusing to testify about the incident to a federal grand jury.

== Trial ==
Sheets and Jackson were set to be tried separately in 1989. Sheets was tried first in April and May 1989. During Sheets' trial, Miller testified that Sheets and Jackson had bragged to him about committing the murders. Miller said that Jackson told him that Sheets pistol-whipped one of the men, causing his gun to discharge. The gunmen then shot the men. Three other witnesses testified that Sheets had talked about the murders while they were incarcerated with him. Additionally, fibers found on the plastic jugs used to set the Shelby bookstore on fire were matched to fibers from gloves found in the Missouri mobile home where the men were arrested in April. However, prosecutors could not place either Sheets or Jackson (both Oklahoma residents) in Shelby, North Carolina on the night of the shooting. Sheets had an alibi placing him in Kansas the day before the murders, January 16. A blizzard struck Kansas on January 16, making it almost impossible for Sheets to have arrived in North Carolina by the night of January 17. Sheets was acquitted of the murders and charges were subsequently dropped against Jackson.

During Sheets' trial attention began to turn to Miller as a suspect in the murders. Unlike Sheets and Jackson, Miller did not have an alibi for the night of the murders. Miller testified about a two-way mirror inside the bookstore, a feature he likely would not have known about unless he had visited the bookstore. Sheets testified that Miller had told him he "made a big boom in Shelby" and one of Sheets' lawyers alleged that in pretrial detention Miller had told Sheets and Jackson "I'm going to be pointing the finger at you, but don't worry. You can't be convicted because it's all hearsay evidence".

== Aftermath ==
While Douglas Sheets and Robert Jackson were not convicted in the Shelby murders, they both received 20 year sentences on weapons charges relating to the weapons cache in Ozark, Missouri. Miller was sentenced to a reduced sentence of 5 years in exchange for his guilty plea and testimony and was released after serving 3 years.

On April 13, 2014, Miller killed three people in two separate shootings at Jewish centers in Overland Park, Kansas. Following the murders, it was reported that North Carolina authorities wanted to question Miller regarding the Shelby murders. Two of Sheets' attorneys at his 1989 trial, Les Farfour and Kirk Lyons, have said they believe Miller was one of the perpetrators of the shooting. Farfour said that, a year after the shooting, Miller's White Patriot Party published a pamphlet claiming credit for burning an adult bookstore in Shelby.

Miller died at the El Dorado Correctional Facility on May 3, 2021.

== See also ==
- Leaderless resistance
- Murders of Gary Matson and Winfield Mowder
- Murder of Blaze Bernstein (2018)
- Orlando nightclub shooting (2016)
- Overland Park Jewish Community Center shooting
- The Order
