= Debora Green =

American doctor and convicted murderer

- Green in 1996
- Born: Debora Jones; February 28, 1951 (age 75); Havana, Illinois, U.S.
- Occupation: Physician
- Spouses: Duane Green (m. 1974; div. 1978) Michael Farrar (m. 1979; div. 1995)
- Children: 3
- Status: Incarcerated
- Convictions: Capital murder (2 counts); Attempted first degree murder (2 counts); Aggravated arson
- Penalty: Life imprisonment (minimum of 40 years)

Details
- Imprisoned at: Topeka Correctional Facility

Debora Green (née Jones; born February 28, 1951) is an American physician who pleaded no contest to setting a 1995 fire that burned down her family's home and killed two of her children, and to poisoning her husband with ricin with the intention of causing his death. The case was sensational, and covered heavily by news media, especially in the Kansas–Missouri border region, where the crimes occurred. Though Green has petitioned for a new trial twice in recent years, her requests have not been successful.

Green married Michael Farrar in 1979 while practicing as an emergency physician. The marriage was tumultuous, and Farrar filed for divorce in July 1995. Between August and September of that year, Farrar repeatedly fell violently ill, and despite numerous hospitalizations his doctors could not pinpoint the source of his illness. Green's emotional stability deteriorated, and she began to drink heavily, even while supervising her children. On October 24, 1995, the Farrar family home, occupied by Green and the couple's three children — Timothy (age 13), Kate (age 10) and Kelly (age 6) — caught fire. Green and Kate escaped without harm. Despite the efforts of firefighters, Timothy and Kelly died in the blaze. Investigation showed that trails of accelerant in the house led back to Green's bedroom, and that the source of Farrar's intractable illness had been ricin, a poison served to him in his food by Green.

Upon her arrest on November 22, 1995, Green was charged with two counts of first-degree murder, two counts of attempted first-degree murder and one count of aggravated arson. She was held on $3,000,000 bail—the highest ever required by Johnson County, Kansas—and maintained her innocence throughout pre-trial motions and a show cause hearing. However, when the defense's own investigators verified the strength of forensic evidence against Green, she agreed to an Alford plea to all charges. On May 30, 1996, Green was sentenced to two concurrent forty-year prison sentences. Green has petitioned for a new trial twice since her conviction. Her first request, which she eventually withdrew, was based on a claim of having been rendered incompetent for plea bargaining by the psychiatric medications she was taking at the time of her hearings; her second, which was denied by a judge, claimed that the evidence used to convict her of arson had been rendered obsolete by scientific advances.

== Early life and medical training ==
Debora Green was born on February 28, 1951, in Havana, Illinois, the second of two daughters of Joan and Bob Jones. Green showed early intellectual promise, and is reported to have taught herself to read and write before she was three years old. She participated in a number of school activities at the two high schools she attended and was a National Merit Scholar and co-valedictorian of her high school class. (Note: Green attended Metamora Township High School in Metamora, Illinois, for the first two years of her high school career; the family then moved to Peoria, and Green attended Peoria (Central) High School.) Those who knew Green at the time later described her as "[fitting] right in" and someone who was "going to be successful."

Green attended the University of Illinois from the fall of 1969, where she took a major in chemistry. Though she had intended to pursue chemical engineering as a career, she opted to attend medical school after graduating in 1972, believing the market was flooded with engineers. Green attended the University of Kansas' (KU) School of Medicine from 1972 to her graduation in 1975. She chose emergency medicine as her initial specialty and undertook a residency in the Truman Medical Center emergency room after her graduation from medical school.

Throughout her undergraduate and medical school attendance, Debora dated Duane M. J. Green, an engineer. The couple married while she was studying at KU. The couple lived together in Independence, Missouri, while Debora finished her residency, but by 1978 they had separated and then divorced. Debora cited basic incompatibility as the reason for the divorce—"[...W]e had absolutely no common interests", she was later quoted as saying—but the divorce was amicable.

During the period of her marital separation, Green met Michael Farrar, a student in his twenties completing his last year of medical school. Farrar was struck by Green's intelligence and vitality, though he was embarrassed by her habit of explosively losing her temper at minor slights. In contrast, Green felt that Farrar was a stable, dependable presence. The couple were married on May 26, 1979. When Farrar was accepted for an internal medicine residency at the University of Cincinnati (UC), the couple moved to Ohio. Green went into practice at Cincinnati's Jewish Hospital as an emergency physician but grew dissatisfied and eventually switched specialties. She began a second residency in internal medicine, joining Farrar's program.

== Farrar–Green marriage ==
=== Children and medical career ===
By the early 1980s, Green had developed a number of medical issues, including surgery on an infected wrist, cerebellar migraines and insomnia. The Farrars' first child, Timothy Scott, was born on January 20, 1982. After a six-week maternity leave, Green returned to her fellowship in hematology and oncology at UC.

On December 27, 1984, the Farrars' second child, Kate, was born. Green again returned to her studies after maternity leave, and by 1985 had completed her fellowship. She went into private practice in hematology and oncology while Farrar finished the last year of his cardiology fellowship. Later the couple both joined established medical practices in the Kansas City, Missouri, area. After a year, Green started her own private practice, which prospered until she became pregnant and took time off work for another maternity leave. The Farrars' third child, Kelly Christine, was born on December 13, 1988.

As the Farrar children grew older, they were enrolled in The Pembroke Hill School, a private school in Kansas City. Green was reportedly a good mother who wanted the best for her children and encouraged them in their activities of choice. Though she attempted to resume her medical career after her last maternity leave, her practice faltered and her chronic pain increased. In 1992, Green gave up her practice and became a homemaker, working part-time from the family's house on medical peer reviews and Medicaid processing. Medical professionals who worked with Green during this time described her as being distant and cold towards her patients and displaying obsessive behavior towards her husband.

Farrar later alleged that Green had been self-medicating with sedatives and narcotics to treat pain from infections and injuries periodically throughout their marriage. He recounted several episodes to author Ann Rule in which he had confronted Green with issues regarding her demeanor, handwriting and speech patterns that indicated drug intoxication, and said that Green had agreed to stop using the medications each time he confronted her.

The Farrar children were all engaged in activities outside the home. Timothy played both soccer and ice hockey, while Kate was a ballerina with the State Ballet of Missouri by the age of ten. During this time, Farrar worked long hours and Green accompanied the children to their activities, though perception of her by other parents at the activities varied—some felt she was a supportive mother, while others believed she drove her children too hard and put down their efforts too often.

=== Green and Farrar ===
Farrar admitted that the marriage was never ideal. He later said that neither partner had expressed their love to each other, even at the early stages of marriage. Farrar recounted that Green seemed to lack the coping skills most adults bring to bear in challenging times; when she went into a rage, she sometimes harmed herself or broke things, and rarely gave any thought to whether she was in a private or public setting during these episodes. By the early 1990s, Farrar worked long hours away from the home to avoid arguments and what he perceived as his wife's shortcomings as a homemaker. When the couple fought, Green responded by treating the children, especially Timothy, as small adults and telling them about what their father had done wrong. Swayed by their mother's opinions about their father, the children began to resent and disobey Farrar, to the point where Timothy and Farrar had physical altercations.

In January 1994, Farrar asked Green for a divorce. Although she believed Farrar was having affairs outside the marriage, she later claimed to have been taken by surprise by his desire to end the marriage and responded to his asking for a divorce explosively, shouting and throwing things. Farrar moved out of the family home, though the two remained in contact and informally shared custody of the children. With the pressure of living together removed, the couple attempted reconciliation, and decided that a larger house would ease some of the disorganization that had affected their marriage. In May, after four months of separation, they put in a bid on a six-bedroom home in Prairie Village, Kansas, but backed out before the sale went through. Farrar later said that he had "backed down" in the face of his ongoing worries about the state of his marriage and the couple's debt load.

Shortly after (Note: Dates for this are uncertain; The Kansas City Star cites "the day after" their purchase of the Prairie Village home was cancelled, while Ann Rule's Bitter Harvest cites "two or three days".) the Prairie Village home purchase fell through, however, the couple's Missouri home caught fire while the family was out. Insurance investigators later determined that the fire was caused by an electrical short in a power cord. Though the house was repairable and the couple's home insurance paid out on the damage and lost property, the couple decided to move on, and Green and the children moved into the apartment in which Farrar had been living during the separation while the purchase of the Prairie Village home was renegotiated .

The couple put extra effort into avoiding the issues that had caused strife before their separation: Despite being an indifferent cook and housekeeper, Green tried to focus on cooking and keeping the new house cleaner, while Farrar vowed to curtail his work hours so that he could spend more time with the family. The improvements lasted mere months, however, and by the end of 1994, both Green and Farrar had fallen back to their old habits and the marriage was again floundering. Fearful of another confrontation with Green, and looking forward to a trip to Peru the family had planned for June 1995, Farrar nevertheless decided to wait until after the trip to raise the issue of a divorce again.

=== Divorce ===
During their trip to Peru in June 1995, sponsored by The Pembroke Hill School, Farrar met and befriended Margaret Hacker, whose children also attended the school. Hacker was a registered nurse married to an anesthesiologist, and also unhappy with her marriage. The two began an affair shortly after both families returned from Peru. In late July, Farrar again asked Green for a divorce. Green responded hysterically and told the children that their father was leaving them. Green was especially upset that a broken home might later disqualify the children from debutante events such as the Belles of the American Royal.

Despite the impending divorce, Farrar initially declined to move out of the family home. He was concerned that Green, who had never been a heavy drinker of alcohol, was suddenly consuming large quantities while supervising the children. Though Green continued her routine of ferrying the children to after-school activities, she would spend her evenings drinking at home, sometimes to the point of unconsciousness and nearly always until she lost what inhibitions she had left about her language in front of the children. On one occasion, Farrar was called home from work by the children, who had found their mother unresponsive. Green had disappeared from the home by the time Farrar arrived there, and though he eventually discovered that she had been hiding in the basement while he searched for her, she claimed at the time to have been wandering the town, hoping to be hit by a car. Farrar moved out of the house in early autumn due to concerns about his personal safety.

== Fire ==
On October 24, during the early morning, Farrar received a phone call at his apartment from a neighbor who shouted that his house—meaning the Farrar–Green family home in Prairie Village—was on fire. Farrar immediately drove there. A 9-1-1 call placed from the house at 12:20 a.m. alerted police dispatchers to possible trouble, though the caller did not speak before hanging up. A police cruiser found the house on fire. Fire trucks were dispatched at 12:27 to what was classed as a "two-alarm" fire. The first firefighters on the scene reported that Green and her ten-year-old daughter Kate, both wearing their nightclothes, were safely outside the house by the time they had arrived. Kate begged firefighters to help her brother and sister, thirteen-year-old Timothy and six-year-old Kelly, who were still inside. Green stood next to her daughter and was reported to have been "very calm, very cool." At least two firefighters attempted to search inside the home for the missing children, but the building was so consumed by flames that they could only access a small portion of the ground level before the structure became unsafe.

By the time the fire was under control, the house was almost totally destroyed, leaving behind only the garage and some front stonework. The fire had spread rapidly, and although high winds contributed to the intensity, authorities deemed the speed with which the house had become fully involved suspicious enough to bring in arson investigators. The bodies of Timothy and Kelly were not recovered until the following morning, when the house had cooled enough to permit safe searching. Kelly had perished in her bed, most likely of smoke inhalation. Timothy's body was found on the ground floor, near the kitchen. Investigators at first assumed he had died trying to escape, but later determined that he had perished in or near his bedroom, most likely of smoke inhalation and heat, and that his body had fallen through burned flooring to where it was discovered.

== Police questioning ==
The surviving members of the Farrar–Green family were taken from the fire scene to police headquarters for questioning. Detectives were sent to the house to begin an investigation. Local Prairie Village detectives separated Green, Farrar and their daughter Kate (who was accompanied by Farrar's parents) and began to question Green.

=== Green's account ===
According to video of the police interview, Green reported that the family had a normal day before the fire. The children went to school and performed their chores before attending various after-school activities—Kate went to her dance class, Timothy to a hockey game. Farrar had taken Timothy and Kelly to the hockey game, while Green took Kate to ballet lessons. The family regrouped around 9 p.m. when Timothy and Kelly were dropped back at the Prairie Village house for dinner.

Green told police that she had one or two drinks after dinner and went to her bedroom, leaving it only to speak to Timothy in the kitchen sometime between ten and eleven in the evening, shortly before he went to bed. Kelly and Kate had gone to bed earlier, each taking one of the family's two dogs with them. Green said that she had fallen asleep around eleven-thirty. At some point before falling asleep, she recalled, she had spoken to Farrar, who had phoned asking which member of the household had paged him. She told police that she and Farrar were in the process of divorce, though she did not know how far along they were, and that although the children were very upset at the prospect, she herself was not and was looking forward to being able to rebuild her life.

Green was awakened some time after midnight by the sound of the home's built-in fire alarm system. She initially assumed that the sound was a false alarm caused by her dogs triggering the burglar alarm, but when she tried to shut off the alarm at the control panel in her bedroom and it continued sounding, she opened her bedroom door and found smoke in the hallway. Green exited the house using a deck that connected to her first-floor bedroom. While standing on the deck, she heard her son Timothy on the home's intercom system, calling to ask her what he should do. "He used to be my thirteen-year-old," Green explained to police, and said that she had told him to stay in the house and wait for firefighters to rescue him. She had then knocked on a neighbor's door to ask them to call 9-1-1. When she returned to the house she found Kate, who had climbed through her second-floor bedroom window, on the roof of the home's garage. Green called to Kate to jump, and Kate landed safely on the ground in front of Green.

Detectives noted that during her interview Green did not appear to be or have been crying, and her manner was "talkative, even cheerful." She repeatedly referred to Timothy and Kelly in the past tense and referred to all of her children by their ages rather than their names. Her accounts of times from the previous evening varied, and she seemed uncertain what time she had done things such as going to bed.

At 5:30 a.m., a detective arrived from the fire scene to advise those at the police station that Timothy and Kelly had been found dead in the home. Green initially reacted with sadness that quickly changed to anger. She shouted at detectives, claiming that firefighters had not done enough to save the children. Where previously she had been cooperative and friendly with the detectives interviewing her, she now began to attack them verbally, calling investigators and their methods "pathetic," alleging that they had withheld from her knowledge of the children's deaths and demanding to be allowed to see Farrar and the remains of the family's house. Though Green stressed to police that she wanted to be the one to "tell my husband our babies are dead," her request was not granted.

Green was released from the police station in the early morning of October 24 after questioning. With the family home burned down, she had nowhere to stay. Farrar refused to let her stay in his apartment but gave her some cash, and she rented a room in a local hotel. Ellen Ryan, Green's divorce lawyer, found her there later in the day in a distraught state. She repeatedly asked Ryan whether her children had died, chanted rhythmically about their deaths and seemed unable to care for herself. Green was transported to a local hospital for treatment but remained emotionally unstable, suffering from insomnia and appearing to Ryan to be unable to take care of day-to-day life, even after her release from the hospital.

=== Farrar's account ===
Police interviewed Farrar at 6:20 a.m, informing him immediately that the bodies of Timothy and Kelly had been recovered. Farrar told police about the deterioration of his marriage and health over the previous six months.

In August 1995, Farrar had fallen ill with nausea, vomiting and diarrhea. He initially assumed it was a residual effect of the traveler's diarrhea many people on the Peru trip had contracted while there. Though he recovered from the initial bout of symptoms, he relapsed about a week later, and on August 18 he was hospitalized with severe dehydration and high fever. In the hospital, Farrar developed sepsis. Doctors identified Streptococcus viridans, which had probably leaked through damaged digestive tissue as a result of Farrar's diarrhea, as the source of the sepsis; however, they could not pinpoint the root cause of the illness itself. Though his illness was severe and possibly life-threatening, Farrar eventually recovered and was released from the hospital on August 25. That night, however, shortly after eating a dinner that Green had served him, Farrar again suffered vomiting and diarrhea and had to be hospitalized. A third bout of symptoms struck on September 4, days after he was released from the hospital for the second time. Basing their conclusions on the likelihood that his illness was related to the Peru trip, doctors narrowed down the possible causes for Farrar's gastrointestinal issues to a handful, though none fitted his symptoms perfectly: typhoid fever, tropical sprue or gluten-sensitive enteropathy. Farrar had noticed that each time he returned home from the hospital, he became ill again almost immediately, and speculated that it may have been due to the stress of his dissolving marriage or the change from a bland hospital diet to a normal home one. When Margaret Hacker, Farrar's girlfriend, told him she suspected Green was poisoning him, he initially wrote off the idea as ridiculous.

Though Green was caring for Farrar in the family home while he recovered from his repeated bouts of illness, she was also continuing to drink heavily and, increasingly often, claiming to be contemplating suicide or to want Hacker dead. In late September, Farrar searched the house and her belongings. In her purse, he discovered seed packets labeled as castor beans, a copy of a supposedly anonymous letter that had been sent to Farrar urging him to not divorce Green and empty vials of potassium chloride. He removed all three items from her purse and hid them.

The next day, Farrar asked Green—who had no interest in gardening that he knew of—what she had intended to do with the seeds. Though she initially claimed that she was going to plant them, when pressed she said that she intended to use them to commit suicide. Green's drinking was especially heavy that day, and as her behavior grew stranger, Farrar contacted police for assistance in placing Green into psychiatric care. Police who responded to the home described Farrar and the children as "shaken" and Green's behavior as "bizarre." Though she did not seem to hold the police's presence against them and gave them no resistance, Green denied being suicidal and called Farrar a series of obscenities. Farrar showed police the seed packets and other items he had found in her purse the day before.

After police transported Green to a nearby emergency room, the attending doctor found Green to be smelling strongly of alcohol but not visibly drunk. Though she appeared unkempt, the doctor felt her demeanor was not unusual for someone going through a bitter divorce and noted that Green professed no desire to hurt herself or others when the doctor interviewed her privately. However, when Farrar came into view in the hospital, Green's demeanor changed. According to the doctor, Green spat at him, called him obscene names and stated, "You're going to get these kids over our dead bodies." Though Green, with some persuasion by the doctor, initially agreed to a voluntary commitment, she shortly thereafter left the ER without informing anyone. She was found hours later, apparently having decided to walk home from the hospital, and was brought back. There, she agreed again to a voluntary commitment to the Menninger Clinic in Topeka, Kansas.

While in the hospital for treatment, Green was diagnosed with "major bipolar depression with suicidal impulses" and placed on Prozac, Tranxene and Klonopin. She returned home after four days in the hospital. Farrar, who had researched castor beans in the interim and came to the conclusion that Green had poisoned his food with the ricin that could be derived from the beans, moved out immediately upon Green's return home.

Farrar recalled that the day of the fire, about a month after his last release from the hospital, he had taken the day off from work—the first day of what he intended to be a week-long vacation to recover some strength after restarting his job post-hospital. He had spent the afternoon with Hacker and then picked up Timothy and Kelly for Timothy's hockey game. After dropping the children back off with their mother at about 8:45, he had dinner with Hacker, leaving her around 11:15 in the evening.

Throughout the evening on October 23, a series of phone calls between Green and Farrar escalated into a confrontation. Farrar was convinced that Green was continuing to drink heavily while supervising the children, told Green that he knew she had poisoned him and told her that social services might be called to protect the children if she failed to get her life in order. After the last call between the couple, Farrar watched television alone in his apartment until about 12:30, when a neighbor's phone call alerted him to the fire.

During his police interview after the fire, Farrar's red eyes and trembling voice were apparent to detectives. He stated that Green had been "very concerned about money" in the context of their impending divorce, and that she may have set fire to the house to garner an insurance payout, but that she had never given any indication of intending to harm her children.

After his interview with the police, Farrar immediately filed for divorce from Green and for custody of Kate, who had been taken in by his parents while Green and Farrar dealt with the police. A court later awarded temporary custody of Kate to Farrar's parents, due to Green's instability and Kate's professed anger with her father. Green was allowed supervised access during this period, while Farrar's visits were not required to be supervised.

=== Kate's account ===
Kate Farrar was interviewed by investigators on October 26. She stated that on the night in question she had woken up to find the fire already burning. Seeing smoke seeping into her room, she opened the bedroom door and called to her brother Timothy, then closed the door and placed the hang-up 9-1-1 call that alerted police. She then crawled out of her bedroom window to escape the fire.

Kate reported that when she called to her mother after escaping onto the garage roof, Green had been "terribly upset" and called to Kate to jump into her arms. Though Green missed catching her daughter when she did jump, Kate was not hurt. When the two ran into Farrar minutes later, Kate said that Farrar had been accusatory toward Green while Green had been crying and worried about her missing children.

According to Kate, Farrar had moved out of the family home and spurned Green's desire for an amicable separation. She stressed that she loved and respected her mother and that all of the children had had good relationships with her, but that she was angry at her father for upsetting her mother by leaving. Pressed, Kate acknowledged that her mother had begun to drink large quantities of alcohol. She denied that she had ever seen matches in the house and expressed surprise that Timothy had not escaped by the same route she had, which was via a bedroom window onto the roof.

== Investigation ==
=== Fire investigation ===
The Eastern Kansas Multi-Agency Task Force was called to conduct an arson investigation on the Prairie Village house on October 24. Staffed by arson investigators and search teams from throughout the area, they focused on determining the origin and cause of the fire, searching through debris for usable evidence and interviewing witnesses. A dog trained to detect the scent of fire accelerants was brought in to assist in searching the house.

Investigators ruled out common causes of accidental fires, including electrical panels and furnaces. They determined that the basement level of the home, which contained the furnaces, had not been a point of origin, though two small orphan fires unconnected to the main burning had occurred in that area. Pour patterns were found on the ground and second floors, indicating that a flammable liquid had been poured there and covered many areas of the ground floor, blocked off the stairway from the second floor to the ground floor and covered much of the hallway on the second floor. The pour patterns stopped at the door of the house's master bedroom but had soaked into carpeting in the hallway leading to the children's bedrooms. Investigators could not determine the precise liquid used as an accelerant, though they proved that a can of gasoline the family kept in a shed had not been used. The amount of accelerant used was identified as between 3 and 10 US gallons (11 and 38 L). Concluding that the fire was a result of arson, the investigators on October 26 called in a second area task force, this one focused on homicide investigation. On October 27, the district attorney for Johnson County was informed that the investigation was now criminal.

=== Police investigations ===
==== Arson case ====
In seeking to find who had set fire to the Farrar–Green house, investigators looked first for physical evidence of fire-setting upon those who had been inside. They suspected that because of the use of accelerant, the fire may have flashed over at the point of ignition and singed or burned the setter. Accordingly, they tested clothing worn by both Farrar and Green that night and took samples of the hair of both. Neither Green's nor Farrar's clothing showed evidence of having been in contact with accelerant; Farrar's hair showed no singeing, but Green's—which had been cut twice between the time of the fire and the time the police took hair samples from her—showed "significant singeing." Detectives recalled that Green had denied ever having been in close proximity to flames; she had reported leaving the house after seeing smoke and not coming into contact with the fire either on the deck outside her bedroom or in the process of coaxing Kate off the garage roof. Neighbors of the family reported that when Green had come to their door to ask them to call for help, her hair had been wet. Though their suspicions pointed to Green, investigators continued to receive tips attributing the fire to any number of people and the investigation continued with no public statement about suspects.

==== Poisoning case ====
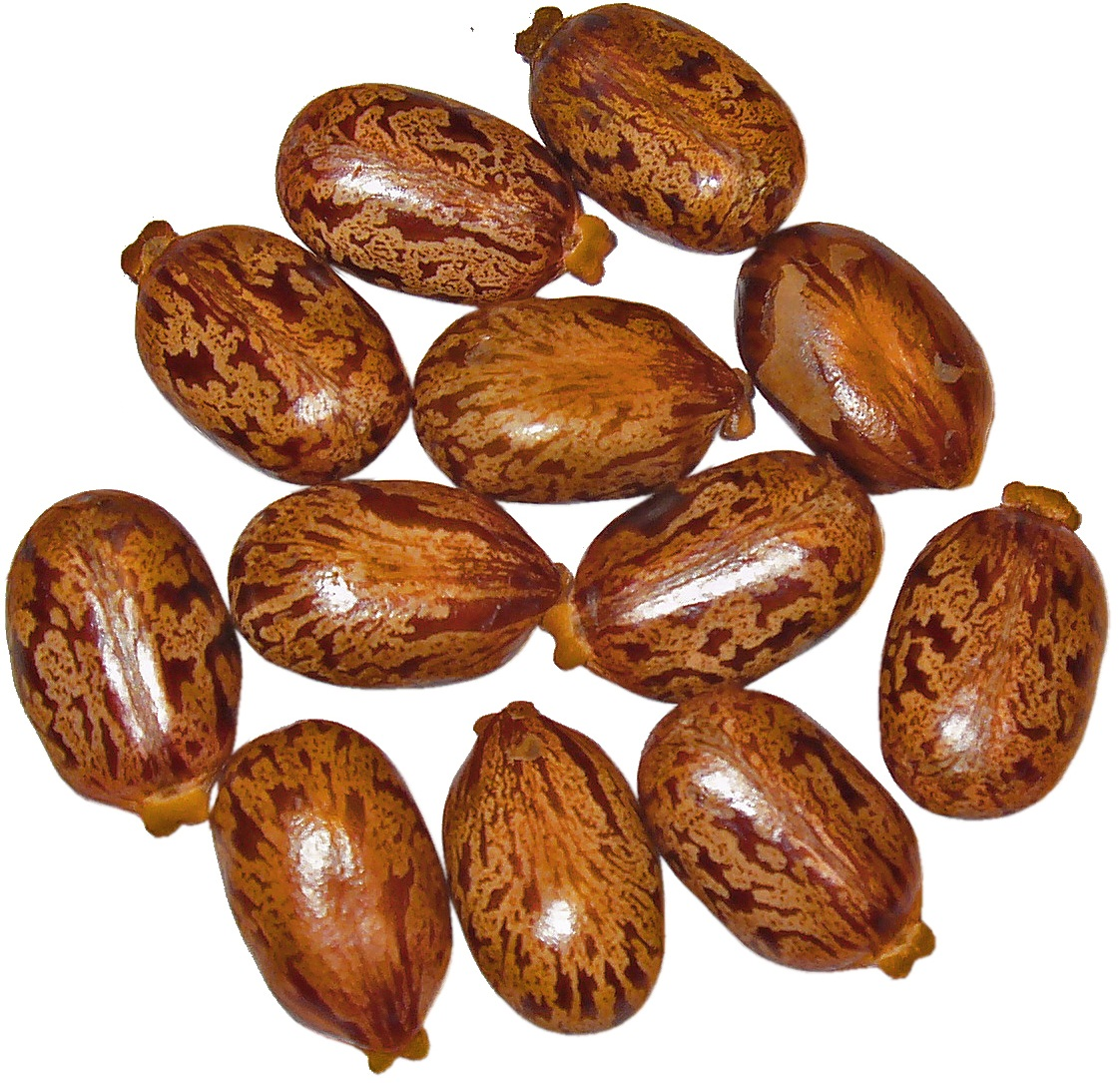
Castor beans, when ground, yield a highly lethal poison called ricin.

When alerted to the possibility of Farrar having been poisoned in the months before the fire, detectives investigated the origin of the castor beans that had led to police investigating the September domestic dispute. The label on the seed packets identified them as a product of the Earl May chain of stores. An officer found contact information for the Olathe, Kansas, Earl May store in Green's address book. The detectives contacted nearby Earl May stores to find if any employees remembered selling castor beans, which are out of season in the fall. A clerk in Missouri recalled that in September a woman had ordered ten packets of the out-of-season seeds and explained that she needed them for schoolwork. The clerk gave a description of the buyer that corresponded to Green and tentatively identified her in a photo line-up as the buyer. Register tapes in the store's records showed that a purchase price corresponding to ten packets of castor beans had been rung up on either September 20 or 22. No records were found in any Earl May store of earlier such purchases that would have corresponded to Farrar first having become ill earlier in the year.

Farrar underwent surgery in November 1995 to treat an aneurism that his doctors believed had been caused by the poisoning. Before the surgery, he submitted blood samples to Johnson County's crime lab to be tested for ricin antibodies.

=== Arrest ===
Media reports in the first week of November 1995 suggested the investigation had narrowed the field of suspects, first to those intimately familiar with the house, and later to one person. Based on the trajectory of the police investigation, news reports in the following days speculated that the apparent poisoning of Farrar may have been linked to the case, but officials declined to name the person suspected in either the arson or the poisoning.

Green was arrested on November 22 in Kansas City, shortly after dropping off her daughter for ballet practice. Though her attorneys had requested that if arrested, Green be allowed to turn herself in voluntarily, the police and district attorney felt that her behavior was too unpredictable and chose to arrest her without warning. Green was charged with two counts of first-degree murder, two counts of attempted first-degree murder and one count of aggravated arson. In a subsequent press conference, District Attorney Paul J. Morrison cited a "domestic situation" as the motive for Green's alleged crimes. Green was initially held in a Missouri jail, then extradited to Johnson County Adult Detention Center in Kansas, on $3,000,000 bond, the highest bail ever asked for in that county.

== Show cause hearing ==
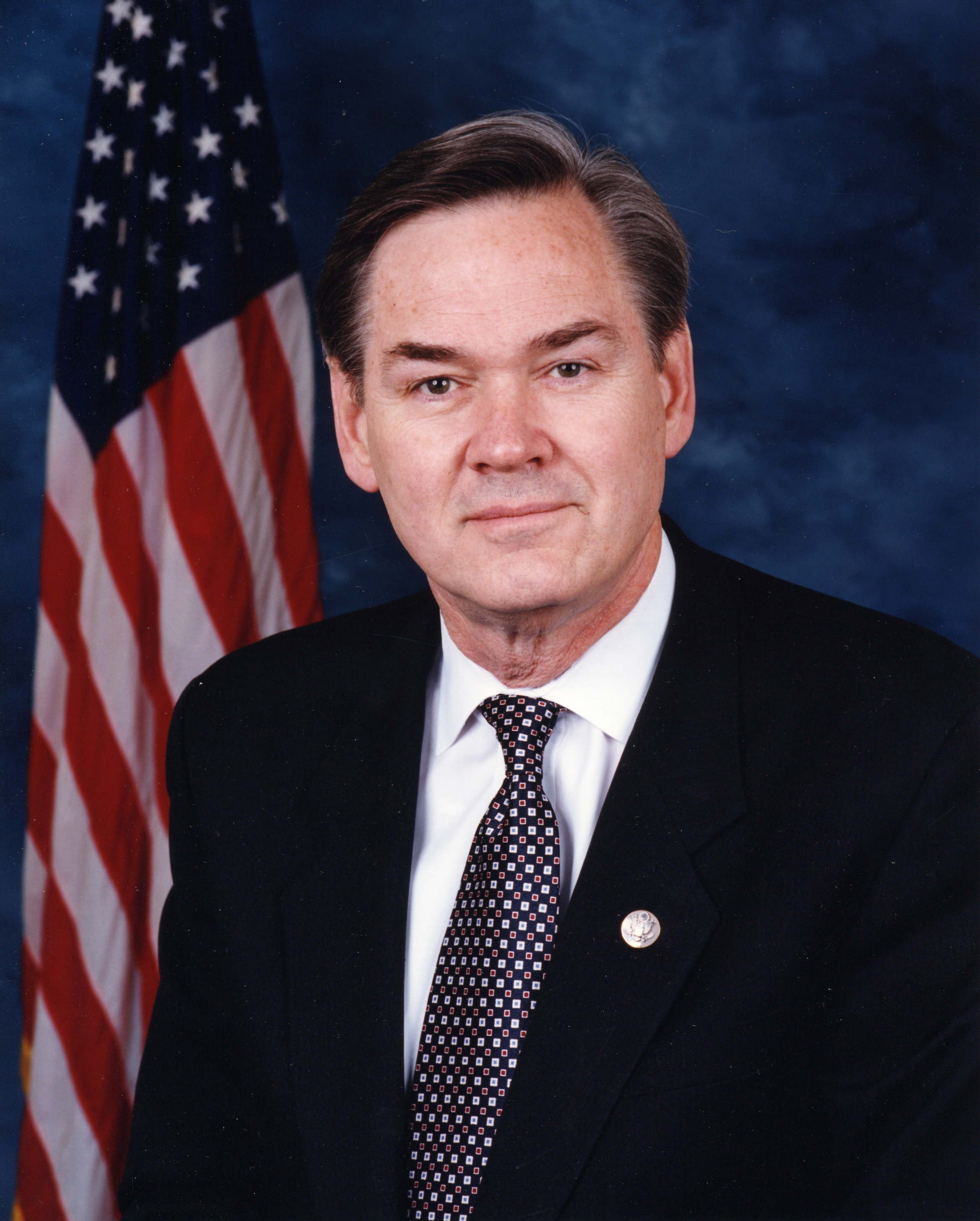
Dennis Moore, later a U.S. Representative, was one of Green's defense attorneys.

A pretrial show cause hearing in the Green case began in January 1996, with Green represented by Dennis Moore and Kevin Moriarty. Green's defense claimed that the fire had been set not by Green, but by her son Timothy, who had once been caught by local police setting off Molotov cocktails. The defense also attempted to attribute Farrar's poisoning to Timothy, who did much of the cooking in the household.

=== State testimony ===
Farrar underwent surgery in December 1995 to treat an abscess in his brain caused by the poisoning. Fearful that he would not survive the proceedings, and knowing that his testimony was key to their case, prosecutors videotaped his testimony beforehand. The surgery was successful, and Farrar testified in person and recounted Green's problems with alcohol and the break-up of their marriage. Under cross-examination by Green's counsel, he admitted that both he and Green had contributed to their marital problems and that his relationship with his son had been so adversarial that they had sometimes come to blows.

Witnesses called by the State supported Farrar's and the prosecutors' earlier claims that police had been called to the home a month before the fire, that Green's behavior had been cause for concern at the time and that Farrar had turned in to police at that time seed packets containing castor beans. The Earl May store clerk who had identified Green as the purchaser of multiple packets of castor bean seeds testified to that effect. Medical evidence was presented that Farrar's illness had not fit neatly within the parameters of any known disease, but that its presentation matched the symptoms of ricin poisoning. An FBI criminologist provided testimony that he had tested for ricin antibodies in Farrar's blood approximately two months after his last acute symptoms and found antibodies there in such large amounts that he could confidently state that Farrar had been subjected to repeated exposures to ricin.

A police officer testified that, as the first responder to the fire scene in the early morning of October 24, he had found Kate to be "very frantic" with worry over her siblings, but that Green had shown little, if any, emotion or concern. The defense argued that the psychiatric medications Green had been taking since her September hospitalization could cause blunted affect, which could have led police and fire personnel to erroneously report that Green had been unemotional.

Arson investigators testified as to how they had located the origin and cause of the fire, stressing that the multiple unconnected, small fires they had found in the home's basement were evidence of the fire having been set purposely and that char patterns on the house's floors were evidence of a liquid accelerant having been used to start the fire. The living room floor had contained the most significant amount of accelerant, and the trail of accelerant had ended at the door of the master bedroom, which had been open while the fire burned. The state of the bedroom door contradicted Green's prior testimony to investigators that her bedroom door had been closed and she had only opened it briefly to look into the hallway.

Detectives who had spoken to both Green and Farrar the night of the fire testified as to Green's unusual demeanor during their interview, and a videotape of the questioning was played, including Green's statements about having urged Timothy to stay in the burning house and her references to her children in the past tense.

The State rested on January 31, 1996.

=== Defense testimony ===
Defense testimony focused on the theory that Timothy, angry at his father, had set fire to the home. Friends of Timothy's testified that he had had a fascination with fire and that he had told friends that he knew how to make bombs. A neighbor testified that he had once caught Timothy burning some grass in the neighbor's yard. A former nanny testified that she had heard Timothy speak about wanting his father dead and planning to burn down the family's house, and had caught him multiple times setting or with the implements to set fires. On cross-examination, the nanny admitted that she had not seen Timothy for years and agreed that she had not reported his fascination with fire to his parents or the police when he had expressed it to her.

The defense rested on February 1. The presiding judge ruled that probable cause had been shown to hold Green for trial. Her arraignment date was set for February 8, with her trial being projected to start in the summer.

== Post-hearing events ==
As the crime involved more than one victim, prosecutors decided to request the death penalty when the case went to trial. When faced with this possibility, Green's defense team brought in Sean O'Brien, a representative of a Missouri anti-capital punishment group.

A series of legal maneuverings involving both sides took place in the late winter and early spring of 1996. Defense attorneys requested that cameras be barred from Green's eventual trial, but the request was rejected. Green was judged by court-appointed psychologists to be competent to stand trial and denied a reduction in bail. The presiding judge ruled that she would stand trial once, for all of the charges against her, rather than be tried separately on each.

Green's defense team undertook its own investigation, hoping to disprove state witnesses' testimony identifying the fire as arson. They found that accelerant had, indeed, been used to stoke the fire and that a robe belonging to Green had been on the floor of the master bathroom, burned in a manner that indicated it had been worn while one of the unconnected fires was set. According to her divorce lawyer Ellen Ryan, when confronted with this evidence, Green acknowledged having set the fire that destroyed her home but denied any clear memory of the event. She continued to claim that Timothy had been the one who poisoned his father. Green agreed to place an Alford plea of "no contest."

=== Plea bargain ===
On April 13, Green's defense team notified district attorney Paul Morrison that she would agree to a plea bargain. On April 17 the plea was made public when Green appeared in court to plead no contest to five charges—two counts of capital murder, one of arson and two of attempted first-degree murder. In exchange for avoiding the death penalty, the no contest plea called for Green to accept a prison sentence of a minimum of forty years without the possibility of parole. Green denied being under the influence of any drug that would affect her judgment in making her plea or her ability to understand the proceedings in which she was participating.

The death of a child, any child, under any circumstances, is a terrible human tragedy. The death of these children under these circumstances is a tragedy almost too great to bear. It is nevertheless a tragedy that I must bear for the rest of my life, and one for which I also must bear responsibility. Nothing that I can do or that can be done to me can bring my children back. In accepting responsibility for this crime, I recognize that I must face and accept the punishment as judged by the court and must also face the sorrow of the loss of my children and the reality of my role in their deaths.

— Excerpt from the sentencing statement of Debora Green, as quoted in Rule, p. 366

After listening to a reading of the prosecution's case against her, Green read a statement to the court in which she said that she understood that the State had "substantial evidence" that she had caused her children's deaths, and that though her attorneys were prepared to provide evidence that she had not been in control of herself at the time of the children's deaths, she was choosing not to contest the state's evidence in the hope that the end of the case would allow her family, especially her surviving daughter, to begin to heal. In a subsequent press conference, defense counsel Dennis Moore told reporters, "She is accepting responsibility for [the crimes]" but said that "I don't think she ever intended to kill her children."

Green was formally sentenced on May 30, 1996, following testimony by the psychologist who had adjudged her competency. According to Dr. Marilyn Hutchinson, Green was immature and lacked the adult-level ability to cope with emotion. Green read another statement to the court and was formally sentenced to two concurrent forty-year prison sentences, minus the one hundred and ninety-one days she had already served. Green is serving her sentence at the Topeka Correctional Facility. As of August 2012, Kansas Department of Corrections records show her earliest possible release date as November 21, 2035—when she will be 84 years old.

== After conviction ==
After her sentencing, Green continued to maintain that her recall of the night of the fire was limited. In the summer of 1996, she wrote to surviving daughter Kate, claiming that she had taken more than the recommended doses of her medications that night. Similar letters to Farrar varied from claims that she had no recollection of the night to firmly stating that she was innocent of the arson. She theorized that Margaret Hacker, Farrar's girlfriend, had set fire to the family's house and reiterated her claim from the show-cause hearing that Timothy had been the one to poison his father. Green wrote to author Ann Rule in 1996 asserting that, due to alcohol abuse, she had not had the mental capacity to start a fire. In a later interview with Rule, she blamed her cloudy thinking during the court hearings on her Prozac prescription and stated that once she was off the drug, her mind became much clearer.

In 2000, represented by a new legal team, Green filed a request for a new trial on the basis of having been rendered incompetent by the psychiatric medications she was taking at the time of her hearings. She alleged that her original attorneys had failed to represent her adequately, instead focusing on avoiding a trial and the death penalty. Green withdrew the request when prosecutors determined that they would seek the death penalty if a new trial was awarded. When, in 2004, the Kansas Supreme Court ruled the state's death penalty unconstitutional, Green filed a second request for a new trial based on a claim of "manifest injustice." Her attorneys claimed that new scientific techniques invalidated the evidence that the fire had been caused by arson. The request was denied in February 2005.

=== Evaluations of psychological state and motivation ===
Though Green has granted no interviews regarding her mental state, a number of sources have attempted to classify her pathology, if any, and her motivation for committing the crimes of which she was convicted. During her sentencing hearing, Marilyn Hutchinson, a psychologist hired by the defense, testified about Green's mental state and capabilities. She characterized Green as cognitively competent and capable of controlling her emotion at a basic level, (Note: "Can the person manage their behavior during the trial? Are they likely to get up and scream or are they going to be unable to stop crying[?] ... The other one that I see as purely emotional is: Is the person motivated toward self-defense? And I found that in both of those purely emotional ones and in the ones that were purely cognitive, she was competent.") but noted that she appeared to be lacking in emotion beyond the level of basic competence. Green was prone to monosyllabic answers during her interview with Hutchinson, and described herself as "tuning out" to avoid excessive emotion. Hutchinson described an affidavit from the doctor who had treated Green during her commitment to the Menninger Clinic, which reported that she had been admitted on the basis of having either major or bipolar depression. Evaluations at the Clinic showed Green to be minimally able to cope with the world, and her treating physician reported that Green had been found to have the emotional capabilities of "a very young child," pursuant to unspecified "life experiences" she had undergone as a preadolescent. Hutchinson's diagnosis for Green was schizoid personality disorder. Her opinion was that Green's intelligence had generally allowed her to compensate for her limited emotional ability in day-to-day life, but that the external stressors of her impending divorce and the interpersonal conflict between Michael and Timothy had overwhelmed her ability to compensate. Hutchinson denied that Green was sociopathic.

Ann Rule began corresponding with Green in 1996 and interviewed her in person in 1997. Rule recalls in her book on the case that Green's letters denied any unhappy childhood memories. Green claimed that though her behavior in the summer and fall of 1995 had been neglectful, she had neither the desire nor the wherewithal to set fire to her house or harm her children or her husband. Rule—who was neither a doctor nor a psychologist but had a background in criminology and law enforcement—believed that even Green does not understand what caused her to attempt to murder Farrar beyond the fact that she had come to hate him. Rule's theory was that in destroying Farrar, Green would have been able to preserve her own ego, in that Farrar would not have been able to leave her for another woman. Psychiatrist Michael H. Stone, using Rule's book as a source of information about Green, identifies Green as showing characteristics of psychopathy, borderline personality disorder and narcissistic personality disorder.

Authors Cheryl Meyer, Michelle Oberman and Michelle Rone, discussing the Green case in their book Mothers Who Kill Their Children: Understanding the Acts of Moms from Susan Smith to the "Prom Mom", point out that Green was adjudged psychologically competent at what would be commonly considered the least-controlled point of any mental illness from which she was suffering: she was on a cocktail of drugs which could treat the symptoms of mental illness but not the illness itself, she had been drinking alcohol in amounts which she had been warned could interfere with her medications and she was coping with the loss of her children. Nevertheless, she spoke for her own mental competence at the time, a judgment which was echoed by the court. Meyer, Oberman and Rone speculate that Green could meet the diagnostic criteria for several mental illnesses, including antisocial personality disorder, but add that the fact that her crimes were a combination of impulsive—arson and the murder of her children—and premeditated—the poisoning of Farrar—makes any mental illness extremely difficult to diagnose.

== In media ==
A May 1996 issue of Redbook magazine featured an essay by Ann Slegman, a friend of Green's who lived in the same neighborhood as the Farrar family. The article covered the author's personal history with Green, the fire and the subsequent investigation (Note: Though published after Green's plea bargain in 1996, the essay's coverage ended with Christmas 1995 and was likely submitted for publication some months before May, to accommodate magazines' typical editorial lead time.) and ended with the author's statement that "It is also possible that an entirely different personality—disassociated from the Debora I knew—committed this crime.[...] The Debora I knew would not have killed her children."

Crime author Ann Rule covered the case in her book Bitter Harvest: A Woman's Fury, a Mother's Sacrifice, which provided extensive detail on both the case's development and Green's personal biography. The book was a New York Times Bestseller, though one reviewer felt that Rule failed to address Green's motivation for her crimes and that she had treated Green unsympathetically and Farrar over-sympathetically.

Green's murders and poisoning cases formed the basis for many media portrayals. The forensic science documentary series Forensic Files, episode "Ultimate Betrayal", which originally aired October 1999, was based on the case. Deadly Women, a true-crime documentary program that focuses on crimes committed by women, featured Green's case in a 2010 episode about women who kill their children. Debora Green was portrayed by Stephanie March in the 2021 Lifetime movie A House on Fire.

A 2002 working paper on bioterrorism, intended to "enable policymakers concerned with bioterrorism to make more informed decisions", included the Green case in a survey of illegal uses of biological agents. The paper noted that Green had refused to provide any detail on the manner in which she extracted and administered the ricin she used against her husband.

== Bibliography ==
- Rule, Ann (2000). Bitter Harvest: A Woman's Fury, a Mother's Sacrifice. Simon and Schuster. ISBN 978-0743202787.
