= Frazier Glenn Miller Jr. =

American white supremacist and murderer (1940–2021)

- 2014 mugshot
- Born: Frazier Glenn Miller Jr. November 23, 1940; North Carolina, U.S.
- Died: May 3, 2021 (aged 80); El Dorado Correctional Facility, El Dorado, Kansas, U.S.
- Other names: Glenn Miller, Frazier Glenn Cross Jr.
- Known for: Overland Park Jewish Community Center shooting
- Political party: White Patriot Party (1980–1987); Democratic (1984); Republican (1986); Independent (2006–2010)
- Spouse: Marge Miller
- Children: Frazier Glenn Miller III; Jesse Miller; Michael Gunjer Miller; 2 daughters
- Motive: Neo-Nazism
- Convictions: Capital murder Attempted first degree murder (3 counts); Aggravated assault Criminal discharge of a firearm
- Penalty: Death

Details
- Date: April 13, 2014
- Locations: Overland Park, Kansas, U.S.
- Killed: 3–6 (Note: Miller was potentially involved in the Shelby bookstore murders in 1987, in which three people were killed. However, he was not charged for the murders and the case is officially unsolved.)
- Weapons: Remington Model 870; Handgun

Frazier Glenn Miller Jr. (November 23, 1940 – May 3, 2021), commonly known as Glenn Miller or Frazier Glenn Cross, was an American murderer, and leader of the defunct North Carolina-based White Patriot Party (formerly known as the Carolina Knights of the Ku Klux Klan) who was the perpetrator of the Overland Park Jewish Community Center shooting. Convicted of murder as well as criminal charges related to weapons, and the violation of an injunction against paramilitary activity, Miller was a perennial candidate for public office. He was an advocate of white nationalism, white separatism, Odinism, and antisemitism.

On April 13, 2014, Miller was arrested following the shooting in Overland Park, Kansas. Johnson County prosecutors initially charged him with one count of capital murder and one count of first-degree murder. On October 17, 2014, the separate charge for first-degree murder was dismissed and all three deaths were included in a single capital murder count. Miller was also charged with three counts of attempted first-degree murder for allegedly shooting at three other people. On December 18, 2014, he was found competent to stand trial, and prosecutors announced that they would seek a death sentence against him.

On August 31, 2015, Miller was found guilty in the Overland Park shooting of one count of capital murder, three counts of attempted murder and assault and weapons charges. Eight days later, the same jury recommended that Miller be executed. On November 10, 2015, he was formally sentenced to death. Miller passed away before he could be executed on May 3, 2021.

== Early life and education ==
Frazier Glenn Miller Jr., a native of North Carolina, was raised in the town of Angier. In his later life, he dropped out of high school and joined the United States Army, where he served 20 years and rose to the rank of master sergeant in the Special Forces. He served two tours of duty in South Vietnam during the Vietnam War.

Miller was introduced to white racialist politics by reading a copy of The Thunderbolt, a newsletter published by Edward Reed Fields of the National States' Rights Party, which had been given to him by his father. He was present as a member of the National Socialist Party of America during the Greensboro massacre on November 3, 1979. He was discharged from the U.S. Army later that year for distributing racist propaganda.

== White Patriot Party ==
In 1980, Miller founded the Carolina Knights of the Ku Klux Klan, a local chapter, which later developed into the White Patriot Party (WPP). He was the leader and principal spokesman for the organization until his arrest in 1987, after which the organization soon dissolved. The WPP was avowedly pro-Apartheid, adhered to the racist Christian Identity theology, and openly advocated the establishment of an all-white nation in the territory of the American South.

After the Southern Poverty Law Center (SPLC) surreptitiously accessed the WPP's computer systems, it presented evidence in court indicating the WPP leadership was planning the assassination of SPLC leader Morris Dees. The court issued an injunction barring the WPP from engaging in paramilitary activity. Miller claimed to have received $200,000 from Robert Jay Mathews, the leader of The Order (which funded its activities by robbing banks and armored cars).

During Miller's time as leader of the WPP, he unsuccessfully sought the Democratic Party's nomination for Governor of North Carolina in 1984, and then the Republican Party's nomination for one of North Carolina's seats in the United States Senate in 1986. He placed last of the three candidates in the Republican primary with 6,652 votes.

== 1987 arrest and conviction ==
In January 1985, Miller signed an agreement with SPLC leader Morris Dees in exchange for dropping a lawsuit that the SPLC had brought against him. In July 1986, however, Miller was accused of violating the terms of the agreement by operating what was deemed a paramilitary training camp. He was found guilty of a criminal contempt-of-court charge. He was sentenced to a year in prison, with six months of the term suspended, and ordered to have no contact with white supremacists.

Dated April 6, 1987, a typewritten letter titled "Declaration of War", signed by Miller, was mailed to 5,000 recipients. It began: "In the name of our Aryan God, thru His beloved Son, I Glenn Miller now this 6th day of April, 1987 do hereby declare total war. I ask for no quarter. I will give none. I declare war against Niggers, Jews, Queers, assorted Mongrels, White Race traitors, and despicable informants". The letter threatened Dees and established a point system for his assassination along with a host of federal officials. The letter proclaimed: "Let the blood of our enemies flood the streets, rivers, and fields of the nation, in Holy vengeance and justice ... The Jews are our main and most formidable enemies, brothers and sisters. They are truly the children of Satan, as Christ tells us in St. John 8:44 ... we promise death to those who attack us or who attempt to place us in ZOG's dungeons." Miller was charged in a warrant with violating the conditions of his bond and was sought as a fugitive.

Miller was arrested on April 30, 1987, after authorities raided a mobile home he and others had rented in Ozark, Missouri, on numerous federal criminal charges in the company of three other men (Tony Wydra, Robert "Jack" Jackson, and Douglas Sheets), who were also taken into federal custody. A cache of weapons was found inside, which included "C-4 plastic explosives, dynamite, pipe bombs, hand grenades, fully automatic M-16, AR-15 semi-automatic rifles, sawed off shotguns, pistols, crossbows, and around a half-ton of ammunition".

Miller was indicted in May 1987 for violating 18 U.S.C. § 876 (communicating a threat via U.S. mail). He pleaded guilty to avoid numerous other violations of federal law and was sentenced to five years in prison. After his arrest, Miller agreed to testify against several defendants in the Fort Smith sedition trial. He served three years (1987–1990) in federal prison following his conviction for weapons violations, as well as for violating the injunction proscribing him from engaging in paramilitary activities. When he was released, he was given the name Frazier Glenn Cross Jr., which he used for several years before ultimately reverting to his birth name. Legally, his name remains Cross.

=== Shelby, North Carolina murders ===
Not long after his arrest, Miller told authorities that Robert Jackson and Douglas Sheets were responsible for a shooting at a gay adult bookstore in Shelby, North Carolina. The shooting occurred on January 17, 1987, and resulted in three deaths and two serious injuries. Sheets and Jackson were indicted for the murders in November 1987. Miller testified against Sheets at his trial in 1989, but Sheets was acquitted of all charges in the shooting while charges against Jackson were dropped after Sheets' acquittal.

== Subsequent activities ==
Miller appeared in the 1991 documentary Blood in the Face.

After his release from prison, Miller began trucking and wrote an autobiography, A White Man Speaks Out, which was privately published in 1999. In its introduction, he asks: "If the Jews can have a Jewish state of their own, then why can't we have a White Christian state of our own?" He repeatedly complains throughout the book that "the Jewish founded, financed, and led American Civil Liberties Union (ACLU) ... brought about the removal of prayer and the bible from public schools. They put the Negroes in and took the bible out, at about the same time they legalized pornography and interracial marriages ... White Christians today represent the best of our Race."

By 2002, Miller had moved to Aurora, Missouri. When he retired from trucking in 2002, he tried to reenter the white supremacist movement by publishing a racist newsletter; however, people with a similar outlook responded with mixed reaction due to some regarding him as a traitor. Miller became affiliated with the Vanguard News Network of Alex Linder, which is an antisemitic, white nationalist website.

In 2004, Miller posted an essay calling on Americans to rise up against Jews, people of color, immigrants, LGBT people, abortion, and church-state separation: "Our race is dying out rapidly right before your very eyes. ZOG is flooding our nation with tens-of-millions of colored aliens. ZOG has murdered over 30 million of our infants in the U.S., through ZOG legalized abortion. ZOG has legalized rectum loving, defecate eating faggots and outlawed our Christian religion from all public institutions and intends to outlaw it completely. When will you stand up and protest these outrages?"

In 2006, Miller ran as an independent write-in candidate against Rep. Roy Blunt, in the 7th Congressional District of Missouri.

In 2009, he published an essay criticizing abortion, LGBT rights, and church-state separation as a government attack on white Christians: "And so now you know why ... the government legalized the abortion murders of over 35 million White gentile infants; why faggots have been legalized; ... why Christian prayers and the Christian bible were kicked out of public schools."

As a perennial candidate, he ran in the 2010 Senate election in Missouri, again as an independent write-in candidate. Miller's 2010 radio campaign advertisements became an issue in Missouri, and nationally. It was disputed whether Miller was a legitimate candidate or using his purported candidacy as a way to get air time, based on his comments on the website of the Vanguard News Network. He responded by stating that he would declare a candidacy and then start running ads. He said that "Federal elections offer public speaking opportunities we can't afford to pass up, and come only once every 2 years." He wanted people to indicate their intention to donate "so I can decide whether or not to run? And say how much."

Despite legal challenges from Missouri Attorney General Chris Koster and the Missouri Broadcasters Association's disputing Miller's status as a bona fide candidate for office, the Federal Communications Commission (FCC) determined there exists no lawful recourse for stations that preferred not to air Miller's ads because of their offensive content. Miller expressed open hatred for Jews repeatedly during an April 2010 interview with David Pakman on The David Pakman Show.

Miller lived for a time under an assumed identity as an FBI informant. During a trial hearing, where Miller received a five-year reduced sentence, details of his time as an informant were revealed, including an incident where Miller was arrested for engaging in sexual acts with a black cross-dressed male prostitute in a vehicle. No charges were pressed due to his status as an informant, but a phone call recorded with the Southern Poverty Law Center in which Miller admitted to the incident was presented at the trial, and claimed that he had lured the prostitute in his car with the intention of beating him.

== Shooting and trial ==
On April 13, 2014, Miller was named the only suspect for the shooting earlier that day in suburban Kansas City that ended with the deaths of three people. Shootings occurred both outside the Jewish Community Center and outside a retirement home, Village Shalom, nearby, both located in Overland Park, Kansas. The victims of the Jewish Community Center shooting were identified as 69-year-old William Lewis Corporon and his grandson, 14-year-old Reat Griffin Underwood. Both were United Methodist Christians. A 53-year-old woman, Terri LaManno, of Kansas City was killed at the parking lot of Village Shalom, where her mother resided. LaManno was also a Christian who attended St. Peter's Catholic Church in Kansas City, Missouri. Several others had been shot at, including one person who was Jewish, but they escaped without wounds. Miller was later found outside an elementary school nearby and he was immediately declared a suspect. Authorities told reporters that Miller had shouted "Heil Hitler" numerous times during the shooting and during his arrest.

The SPLC reported that, according to Miller's wife Marge, Miller had gone to a casino in Missouri the afternoon prior to the shootings. Miller called his wife the next morning at around 10:30 to tell her "his winnings were up and all was well." The shootings occurred less than three hours after the phone call. According to a November 15 interview with The Kansas City Star, Miller alleged he began planning the shootings in late March when he became convinced that he was dying from emphysema.

Attorneys who were assigned to work for Miller during the pre-trial period presented prosecutors with an offer where Miller would plead guilty to first-degree murder and accept a sentence of life imprisonment without parole if the death penalty was nixed in his case; the DA handling the case bluntly said that Miller would not get any plea deal under any conditions, and Miller's attempt to demand a plea bargain during the trial was dismissed by the judge because no offer had ever been made and the issue was not admissible as it was immaterial. Miller represented himself during his trial, ranting and raising bizarre objections such as one regarding witnesses' oaths "because they did not include the word God." Miller and his main supporter, the neo-Nazi Alex Linder, attempted to present hours worth of "evidence" that Miller's actions were justified but were only able to get a few statements on the record before being shut down by the prosecution and the presiding judge. On August 31, 2015, Miller was found guilty of one count of capital murder, three counts of attempted murder, and assault and weapons charges. On September 8, a Kansas jury recommended he get the death penalty. On November 10, 2015, Miller was formally sentenced to death by Johnson County District Judge Thomas Kelly Ryan. On March 29, 2021, Miller appealed his death sentence, arguing that the Court should not have allowed him to represent himself at trial (a complete shift from his stance at the actual trial, where he told the presiding judge that he would be fine as his own attorney because "my IQ is probably higher than yours"), while questioning the constitutionality of capital punishment.

== Death ==
Miller died in prison on May 3, 2021, at the age of 80. The cause of his death has not been identified, but the Kansas Department of Corrections stated that "preliminary assessment indicates the death was due to natural causes".

== Electoral history ==
Democratic primary election, Governor of North Carolina, May 8, 1984
Party	Candidate	Votes	%
	Rufus L. Edmisten	295,051	30.87
	Eddie Knox	249,286	26.08
	Duncan McLauchlin "Lauch" Faircloth	153,210	16.03
	Thomas O. Gilmore	82,299	8.61
	James C. "Jimmy" Green	80,775	8.45
	John R. Ingram	75,248	7.87
	Robert L. Hannon	9,476	0.99
	Frazier Glenn Miller Jr.	5,790	0.61
	J. Andrew Barker	3,148	0.33
	J. D. Whaley	1,516	0.16

North Carolina Republican primary election, U.S. Senate, May 6, 1986
Party	Candidate	Votes	%
	James T. Broyhill	139,570	66.52
	David Funderburk	63,593	30.31
	Frazier Glenn Miller Jr.	6,662	3.17

Missouri's 7th congressional district general election, November 7, 2006
Party	Candidate	Votes	%
	Roy Blunt	160,911	66.75
	Jack Truman	72,573	30.10
	Kevin Craig	7,565	3.14
	Frazier Glenn Miller Jr.	23	0.01
	Republican hold		

United States Senator from Missouri general election, November 2, 2010
Party	Candidate	Votes	%
	Roy Blunt	1,054,160	54.2
	Robin Carnahan	789,736	40.6
	Jonathan Dine	58,663	3.0
	Jerry Beck	41,309	2.1
	Frazier Glenn Miller Jr.	7	0.0
	Republican hold		

== Bibliography ==
- A White Man Speaks Out (1999) ASIN B0722DBGY9

== Works cited ==
- Eamon, Tom (2014). The Making of a Southern Democracy: North Carolina Politics from Kerr Scott to Pat McCrory. UNC Press Books. ISBN 9781469606972. - Profile at Google Books
