= Prospect Township =

Prospect Township may refer to:

- Prospect Township, Butler County, Kansas
- Prospect Township, Ramsey County, North Dakota, in Ramsey County, North Dakota
- Prospect Township, Marion County, Ohio
- Prospect Township, Mellette County, South Dakota, in Mellette County, South Dakota
