= Richard Grissom =

American serial killer

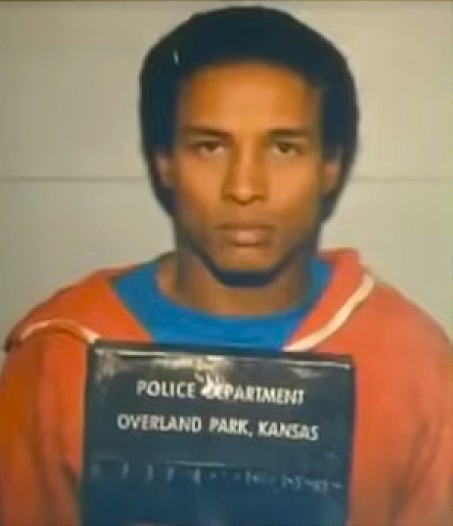
- Born: Richard Anthony Grissom Jr. November 10, 1960 (age 65); South Korea
- Status: Incarcerated
- Convictions: First degree murder (3 counts); Aggravated kidnapping Aggravated burglary (2 counts); Burglary; Robbery; Forgery (6 counts); Theft (2 counts); Giving a worthless check (3 counts)
- Penalty: Life imprisonment

Details
- Victims: 4–5
- Span of crimes: January 27, 1977 – June 26, 1989
- Country: United States
- State: Kansas
- Date apprehended: July 7, 1989
- Imprisoned at: El Dorado Correctional Facility

Richard Anthony Grissom Jr. (born November 10, 1960) is an American serial killer who abducted and murdered three women over an eight-day period in Johnson County, Kansas, in June 1989. Prior to these crimes, Grissom was incarcerated at a juvenile detention center for killing an elderly neighbor as a teenager and was also suspected of murdering a former girlfriend in Wichita. Although the bodies of his last three victims were never found, Grissom was tried and convicted of three counts of first degree murder in 1990. He was sentenced to life in prison and is currently imprisoned at El Dorado Correctional Facility.

== Early life ==
Richard Anthony Grissom Jr. was born on an American military installation in South Korea on November 10, 1960, to an unknown U.S. soldier and a South Korean woman. After his birth his parents gave him up to an orphanage, where three years later he was adopted by U.S. army Sergeant Richard Anthony Grissom Sr. and his wife Fredonia, an African American couple.

After moving to the United States, the family moved across numerous states before finally settling in Kansas. Details of Grissom's childhood are not known, but after his family moved to Leavenworth in the mid-1970s, he enrolled at Leavenworth High School, where he gained popularity as a friendly, good-looking, and smart kid who regularly got As and Bs and was a halfback for his school's football team. Some sources have said that he suffered abuse at the hands of his father.

=== First murder ===
On the morning of January 27, 1977, Grissom and his parents had an argument that abruptly ended when Grissom left their home. Sometime after leaving, he stole a railroad spike, which he used to break into the home of his neighbor, 72-year-old Hazel Meeker, whom he beat to death. He subsequently fled and broke into another home, but since the owners were not home, he stole their handgun. Meeker's granddaughter, Carla, went to visit her grandmother, but found her dead body in a pool of blood. She contacted the police who showed up and conducted an investigation. Police discovered that there were footprints in the snow all around the house, and they subsequently followed the trail which led them to the southern railroad tracks. They continued to follow them until they ended right where Grissom was hiding in a trailer park. When they noticed him, Grissom attempted to bury the handgun he had stolen in the snow, but police handcuffed him before he could.

In custody, Grissom confessed to the murder and asked officers to recover one of his shoes that had fallen off in a creek. Police later went back to the area but could not locate it, but took his word as when he was arrested, he was only wearing one shoe. In April 1977 Grissom, since he was 16 years old, was convicted under a juvenile court and transferred to a Boys Industrial Center in Topeka. In February 1979, Grissom and two other juveniles escaped from the center and were on the run for about a day. During this time they broke into a home in Jefferson County. They were recaptured without resentence, with the superintendent of the youth center filing a juvenile delinquency charge against Grissom.

== University years ==
Grissom was released in 1980, and soon after enrolled at Kansas State University. In September, Grissom traveled to Manhattan where he applied for the track team. During practice he garnered the nickname "rock man" for the fact that he would fall on almost every jump. By October Grissom quit the track team and instead took up racquetball, where he was regarded as a star competitor. He also took up a job at Arby's. The following year he joined the softball team. In 1982 Grissom was listed in the student directory as a sophomore studying architecture. In November 1982, a month before the final exams, Grissom stole $190 from a Manhattan resume service. He was arrested in January 1983, and two months later pleaded no contest to a theft charge was given a suspended sentence and was placed on a three-year probation. Afterwards Grissom drifted between Kansas City and Manhattan. In 1984 Grissom stole a Mazda RX-7, for which he was sentenced to serve time in prison. In June 1988 he was paroled.

== Johnson County murders ==
In 1989, Grissom began a romantic relationship with Terri Renee Maness, a 25-year-old Butler Community College student, and the two planned to have a date on June 6. The next day, Maness, who lived in Wichita, was discovered dead by her neighbor. She had been stripped of her clothes and stabbed to death, and a coroner's report later revealed she had been strangled prior to that. On June 8, Grissom, under the alias of Randy Rodriguez, rented a storage locker in southern Johnson County, which was to remain his until July 1.

On June 12, a masked individual broke into the apartment of 23-year-old Michelle Katf in south Kansas City. As she slept in her bed, the man awoke her and attempted to force her outside with a gun to her head. After a struggle during which witnesses began to notice the assault, the man fled back to his vehicle and drove off.

Six days later, on June 18, 24-year-old Joan Marie Butler of Overland Park went missing. She was last seen at the Country Club Plaza in Kansas City, Missouri by her friends. Seven days after her disappearance, her rental car was found at an apartment complex with witnesses recalling a man fleeing from the car. In the car police located a single blood stain. The following day two roommates, Theresa Brown and Christine Rusch, both 22, hosted a party which was meant to be a farewell to Brown as she was moving out. The next day, when the two did not show up for work, they were reported missing.

=== Investigation and arrest ===
Police were able to pinpoint Grissom as a suspect after he was identified as a person spotted on surveillance cameras using Butler's bank card. Since police had no evidence of a kidnapping, authorities charged Grissom with one count of theft, but since he had not yet been located, police alerted the public. At the same time, friends of Brown and Rusch saw Grissom's photo and identified him as a man who attended Brown's going away party. Detectives learned that on the same day Brown and Rusch disappeared Grissom rented a second storage locker along with a woman identifying herself as Brown in Stanley. Approximately a couple of hours later bank surveillance captured Rusch on video withdrawing money from an ATM.

In late June, law enforcement received a warrant to inspect Grissom's car, a brown Toyota, which was found to be holding Brown and Rusch's credit cards, along with a 12-inch, red stained knife. Additionally witnesses who lived near Butler's apartment said they had seen a car similar to Grissom's parked outside of the apartment building in the days after the murder. This same vehicle was also concluded to have been the same vehicle the perpetrator of Katf's attempted abduction drove, according to a witness named Thomas Haynes. Police searched through both of Grissom's storage lockers and collected numerous strands of hair on the floors. The hair strands were submitted to the Johnson County crime lab who compared the strands to hair collected from the women's hairbrushes, and the lab found a high probability the hairs found in the lockers belonged to the women. Finally, in the homes of Brown and Rusch police uncovered strands of male pubic hair, which contained DNA, and when it was compared to a DNA sample of Grissom, they were a match.

In early July, the FBI located Grissom hiding out in Texas, and 15 federal agents were dispatched there to arrest him. On July 7, they staked out an American Airlines terminal in Dallas for about 4 1/2 hours. At 9:45 a.m., they spotted Grissom and arrested him without incident. Grissom was then led to an interrogation room, where for about eight hours he was questioned by FBI agent Mike Napier and Leawood Police Detective Joe Langer, who pressed him about the incriminating evidence. According to both, Grissom spoke little to them and requested an attorney. It was found that he had been staying at a motel in Corpus Christi, and authorities searched through it, though no new evidence was found.

Despite that no trace of the women had yet been found, authorities had enough evidence to suggest that all three had been killed, and charged Grissom with three counts of first degree murder, one count of aggravated kidnapping, four counts of aggravated robbery, two counts of aggravated burglary, one count of burglary and one count of theft. Grissom remained in a Dallas jail to await extradition to Kansas, however he attempted to fight his extradition and it would not be until November that he returned to Kansas.

== Trial and convictions ==
In March 1990, judge Robert Jones lowered Grissom's robbery charges from four counts of aggravated robbery to four counts of simple robbery. On March 14, Grissom entered a not guilty plea to the charges. He went to trial in October, with the defense maintaining Grissom's innocence and the prosecution accusing him of killing the three women. As part of their evidence, prosecutors called upon Robin Cotton, a genetic specialist, who said it was "highly likely" that the blood found in Grissom's car came from a child of Ralph and Jenelda Butler, Joan Butler's parents.

The trial coincided with the 1990 Kansas gubernatorial election, and Republican governor Mike Hayden, who was seeking re-election, used the case as an example as to why capital punishment should be reinstated by arguing that if Grissom had been sentenced to death for the 1977 murder, then he would not have been able to kill the other three women. This sparked controversy as several individuals, including former governor John William Carlin, pointed out that Grissom could not have received the death penalty at the time because he was a juvenile. Hayden would lose the election to Democratic opponent Joan Finney in November. On November 4, the jury deliberated for twelve hours before finding Grissom guilty of all charges. He was therefore sentenced to serve four life terms on November 20.

In 1992, the parents of Terri Renee Maness attempted to persuade Sedgewick County district attorney Nola Foulston to indict Grissom with her murder. Foulston responded to this by saying that an indictment was unlikely because the case was "still considered under investigation", but police lieutenant Ken Landwehr acknowledged that Grissom was the case's only suspect, and that the investigation was "pretty much dead in the water".

=== Incarceration ===
Photo of Grissom from the Kansas Department of Corrections

In October 1998, it was discovered that Grissom had joined an internet pen pal group dedicated to those incarcerated. Family members of his victims expressed their disappointment that such a website was allowed; Tim Butler, who was the brother of Joan Butler, wrote to the web site operators and said, "the monster Grissom forgot to mention his other hobbies: bludgeoning old ladies with railroad spikes and killing and torturing young women."

In 2010 The Wichita Eagle daily newspaper erroneously wished a happy birthday to Grissom, who had turned 50. This was seen by many as inappropriate, but the newspaper agency responded by explaining that they received no info about Grissom's background prior to the paper's publishing and that they had been a victim of a prank. In 2017, Grissom was accused of passing a sexually explicit note to a female corrections officer. While Grisson admitted to passing the note, he claimed the woman wanted him to. She denied it, and Grissom was to spend 30 days in segregation. As of 2026, Grissom is currently imprisoned at El Dorado Correctional Facility. He will not be eligible for parole until 2093.

== Search for bodies ==
In late July 1989, the KCTV news station in Kansas City, Missouri was sent an anonymous two-page letter, which offered to release the three women, whom the writer claimed were being held against their will, for an exchange of $1.5 million. The origins of the letter were investigated, and it contained a Chillicothe, Missouri postmark and a Brookfield, Missouri return address. David Burger of the Lenexa Police Department stated that the letter, "didn't attach any credence", and there was, "no validation to the demands". The writer was identified as 21-year-old Gary Lewis of Chillicothe. Johnson County investigators determined that Lewis was not holding the women against their will, did not have any connection with Grissom, nor was he connected to the case. Lewis admitted to writing the letter and was charged in court with attempted theft and falsely reporting a crime. Lewis said that he merely wrote the letter as a way to gain attention. In 1990, after exchanging with prosecutors to drop the attempted theft charge, Lewis pleaded guilty to falsely reporting a crime, and judge Gerald Hougland imposed a maximum sentence of one year in prison and ordering Lewis to pay $1,500.

In August 1999, a team of searches from NecroSearch inc. scoured a landfill near Clinton Lake after theories about the women's bodies being buried there emerged. However, the search turned up no results. The women's bodies have never been recovered, and Grissom has refused to offer information. He has also refused to offer information in the murder of Terri Renee Maness, for which he remains the prime suspect.

== In media ==
=== Books ===
- Dan Mitrione (September 15, 1996). Suddenly Gone: The Terrifying True Story of a Serial Killer's Grisly Kidnapping-Murders of Three Young Women. Macmillan. ISBN 0312960522.

=== Television ===
- The Discovery Channel TV show The New Detectives detailed Grissom's murder spree in the episode "Presumed Dead", that aired in 1999.
- The true crime TV show On the Case with Paula Zahn examined Grissom's killings and subsequent arrest in the episode "Gone in an Instant", that aired in 2016.

== See also ==
- List of serial killers in the United States
- List of murder convictions without a body
