= Martin Priest =

American murderer (born 1957)

- Born: Martin Dean Priest; 1957 (age 68–69); Nevada, Missouri, U.S.
- Other name: "Marty"
- Convictions: Kansas; First degree murder Theft; Missouri; First degree murder
- Penalty: Kansas; Life imprisonment Missouri; Life imprisonment

Details
- Victims: 2–5
- Span of crimes: 1980–1985
- Country: United States
- States: Missouri, Kansas
- Date apprehended: March 30, 1985
- Imprisoned at: Lansing Correctional Facility, Lansing, Kansas

Martin Dean Priest (born 1957) is an American murderer and suspected serial killer. Convicted of murdering a young girl and a man in both Missouri and Kansas, Priest is also suspected, but acquitted, in another three murders dating from 1980 to 1985. He is currently serving two life sentences at the Lansing Correctional Facility in Lansing, Kansas.

== Murders ==
=== Tonya Lewis ===
On June 15, 1980, the body of 12-year-old Tonya Lea Lewis, a student at Nevada Middle School, was found floating on a farm pond about 11 miles south of the city by two men who had gone fishing. According to the Vernon County Sheriff Department, she had died about two days prior. Initially, the cause of death couldn't be determined and no obvious signs of wounds could be located after the autopsy, but the authorities nevertheless treated the case as a suspected homicide. Almost a month later, 22-year-old local Martin Priest was arrested for the death, now determined to be a drowning, remaining in custody with a $250,000 bond.

At the time, Priest was part of a painting crew and was working in the Lewis household when he overheard a conversation between Tonya and a friend, Kelly Schumacher, who wanted to go to the municipal pool. He excused himself before his boss with a supposed job interview, but instead went to see Tonya, allegedly making arrangements for the two of them to play basketball later. After Lewis failed to return home, her mother, Shirley, questioned Martin about the disappearance, but he explained that after he left their supposed game, he went home and stayed there all night.

On the day Tonya had disappeared, he had been jailed on charges of forgery and theft. While awaiting his capital murder trial, Priest's third wife, 32-year-old Genieve, attempted to break him out of jail on August 5. She struck the prison guard on the back of the head and demanded that they release her husband. The jailer refused, and she then fled, but was later arrested and charged with attempted prison escape. On March 5, 1981, Priest was convicted of Lewis' murder and sentenced to 25 years imprisonment. He filed for retrial twice, but both motions were denied by Justice William Kimberlin. The following year, Genieve committed suicide. In 1983, Martin filed another retrial, but this time successfully received an acquittal - since no cause of death could be determined, there was no conclusive proof that she hadn't died accidentally, and thus, he was released.

=== Tammy Rothganger ===
On May 16, 1984, the 14-year-old Rothganger disappeared while walking to school from her home in Eldon. She was last seen entering Priest's car, which was additionally occupied by his nephew, 13-year-old David Nicholas. According to Nicholas, Priest knocked the girl unconscious with a wrench, before proceeding to rape and strangle her. He then abandoned the body at a local residence, but he then returned to the dump site and disposed of it in another location.

=== Suspected murders ===
Priest is the prime suspect in three other murders, all of which he has nonetheless been acquitted.

==== Katrina Cheely ====
On November 16, 1984, 15-year-old Katrina Cheely mysteriously vanished after leaving for Allison Junior High School in Wichita, Kansas. Originally from Binghamton, New York, Katrina moved to Wichita in December 1983 to live with her mother, and was described as a nice friendly girl. Her partly decomposed nude body was discovered in a culvert by a farmer on February 28, 1985, after he decided to inspect what his dog had barked at for the last month. She was positively identified as Cheely from a school book and a ring she was wearing. The forensic examiner, Dr. William Eckert, determined that she had been asphyxiated, but hadn't been sexually assaulted.

Martin and Katrina's mother, Linda Hall, had met in 1984, shortly after the former moved to Wichita. Hall, who described her new boyfriend as a very nice person, noted that on the day of her daughter's disappearance, Martin was at the home. Katrina was running late for school, and he had offered her a ride there. According to testimony from Martin's fourth wife, Debra Yoder, he bragged to her that he had driven around the neighborhood and then tried to molest Katrina. When she resisted, he strangled her with her own pantyhose.

==== William Mayhugh and Frieda Bayliff ====
On December 27–28, two bodies were found to the north-northwest part of Wichita. Both victims had been shot, which led to speculation that the deaths were related. The male victim, 25-year-old William H. Mayhugh, was found in a ditch near the Arkansas River, with a single gunshot wound to the head. He was discovered by flood control supervisor Bob Jennings while he was checking the floodways. According to Jennings, it was likely that Mayhugh had been in there since the weekend, as he still wore clothes suited for the cold weather. The following day, 33-year-old Frieda Bayliff was discovered dead at the home the couple shared. She had been strangled to death. Both were last seen by relatives on Christmas.

Priest met the pair through Frieda, who worked as a waitress at the same Wichita bar where he met Linda Hall.

== Arrest, trials and imprisonment ==
In March 1985, Martin Priest, who was serving time for theft, posted bond and went under the radar. Hours after his release, new evidence collected from an obtained firearm, a .32-caliber pistol, pointed towards his guilt in the Mayhugh-Bayliff slayings, and authorities started searching for him. On April 30, Priest was arrested without incident at the Todd Motel in Fort Scott, near the border with Missouri.

After a few-month long trial, Priest was convicted of killing Mayhugh, but acquitted in Bayliff's death. He received a mandatory life sentence, with eligibility for parole in 15 years. In 1987, Debra Yoder, Priest's fourth wife, told the police that she had received Cheely's bracelet as a birthday present from him. This was considered enough evidence to charge Martin with the girl's death, but in a shocking turn of events, he was found not guilty on December 12.

In 2016, Nicholas came forward to the police and informed them on the circumstances of Rothganger's killing. Using his testimony, Priest was charged with her death, and successfully convicted two years later, receiving another life sentence. While investigators believe her body has been buried somewhere in Miller County, Rothganger still hasn't been located.
