= El Dorado Correctional Facility =

Maximum security prison in Butler County, Kansas, U.S.

Coordinates: 37°48′15″N 96°48′59″W

- Interactive map of El Dorado Correctional Facility
- Location: 1737 SE US Highway 54 El Dorado, Kansas
- Status: Open
- Security class: Maximum
- Capacity: 1,511
- Opened: 1991
- Managed by: Kansas Department of Corrections
- Warden: Tommy Williams

The El Dorado Correctional Facility (abbreviated EDCF) is a maximum security prison located east of the city of El Dorado in rural Prospect Township, Butler County, Kansas, United States.

EDCF is the location of the Kansas Department of Corrections (KDOC) Reception and Diagnostic Unit (RDU), which processes every male inmate when they are received into custody. RDU helps determine the inmate's custody level, mental health classification, and educational program needs before he is assigned to a facility.

EDCF has two general population cellhouses and one medium security dormitory. EDCF is administratively linked to two minimum security units, formerly "honor camps", one in El Dorado and one in Toronto, Kansas. In 2009, the announcement was made that the state would be closing both minimum security units, due to budget constraints. As of 2015, medium and minimum security units in Oswego were administratively part of EDCF.

EDCF also houses male inmates sentenced to death by Kansas courts. There is no specific part of the prison that is the "death row". Inmates sentenced to death are housed in administrative segregation ("AdSeg"). The state currently has nine inmates on death row, all male, with eight of them at El Dorado. Executions, however, take place at the Lansing Correctional Facility (LCF) in Lansing. The state has not had an execution since June 22, 1965, when spree killers George York and James Latham were hanged there.

== History ==
The El Dorado Correctional Facility was established in 1991. It was built in response to a federal mandate to ease over-crowding at the state's other two maximum security prisons. Expansion in 2001 brought two new general population cellhouses. The facility is expected to expand in the future.

The state chose El Dorado to house most male condemned prisoners as they wanted different employees to supervise them for the majority of the time from the ones who would be implementing capital punishment.

The first escape in facility history occurred on October 28, 2007. Inmates Jesse Bell and Steven Ford escaped with the assistance of former corrections officer, Amber Goff. The three were apprehended in Grants, New Mexico, less than three days later. Bell and Ford were arrested in an apartment complex parking lot. Goff was found asleep in the driver's seat of a car parked in the driveway of a nearby vacant Grants home; a stolen handgun was found under a newspaper next to her.

Circa 2017, the state has considered relocating executions from the Lansing Correctional Facility to the El Dorado Correctional Facility.

== Notable inmates ==
Inmate Name	Register Number	Status	Details
Dennis Rader	0083707	Serving 10 life sentences without parole.	Serial killer also known as the "BTK Killer" who murdered 10 people between 1974 and 1991.

- Reginald and Jonathan Carr – brothers were convicted of killing five people in a December 2000 crime spree dubbed the "Wichita Massacre" and sentenced to death. Their death sentences have been overturned and reinstated.
- Richard Grissom - a convicted serial killer who murdered three women in 1989. Their bodies have never been found.
- Martin Priest – a convicted murderer and possible serial killer.
- John Robinson – a convicted serial killer, con man, embezzler, kidnapper, and forger. He was found guilty in 2003 of three murders and was sentenced to death for two of them. He subsequently admitted responsibility for five additional homicides, and investigators fear that there might be other, undiscovered victims. Because he made contact with most of his post-1993 victims via online chat rooms, he is sometimes referred to as "the Internet's first serial killer".

== Former inmates ==
Inmate Name	Status	Details
Frazier Glenn Miller Jr.	Sentenced to death in 2015. Died in May 2021.	American white supremacist who committed the Overland Park Jewish Community Center shooting in 2014, in which he murdered three people.
