= Topeka Correctional Facility =

Prison in Kansas, U.S.

Coordinates: 39°02′23″N 95°37′28″W

- Interactive map of Topeka Correctional Facility
- Location: 815 S.E. Rice Road Topeka, Kansas
- Status: multi-security
- Capacity: 764
- Opened: 1970s
- Managed by: Kansas Department of Corrections
- Director: Warden Dona Hook

Topeka Correctional Facility is a Kansas Department of Corrections state prison for women located in Topeka, Kansas. Built in the 1970s, in 1995 it became the only women's prison in the state. It administers a wide range of security levels, from maximum security through work-release.

The site was founded in 1895 as Kansas Industrial and Educational Institute—later known as Kansas Technical Institute—by the African American educator Edward S. Stephens, as a school on its own farmland, more or less modeled on the Tuskegee Institute. The school closed in 1955.

The state would send a woman sentenced to death to this prison in the event that such happens. The execution chamber for prisoners of all genders is at Lansing Correctional Facility.

== Conditions ==
Conditions in the facility have long been identified as extremely problematic.

A series of investigative articles in The Topeka Capital-Journal in September 2009 revealed a "complex black market" of contraband, bribes, and a sex trade, practices that culminated in a prison employee impregnating an inmate. In January 2010 two independent audits, one by the National Institute of Corrections and another by a committee of the state legislature, recommended two dozen operational changes, and the facility's administrator was reassigned elsewhere.

The result of a 2011–2012 investigation by the United States Department of Justice Civil Rights Division found that the problems persisted. The Division's September 6, 2012 letter to Kansas Governor Sam Brownback concluded that "TCF fails to protect women prisoners from harm due to sexual abuse and misconduct from correctional staff and other prisoners in violation of their constitutional rights. TCF has a history of unabated officer-on-prisoner and prisoner-on-prisoner sexual abuse and misconduct."

== Notable inmates ==
- Debora Green - Sentenced to 40 years to life for killing her two children.
- Sarah Brooke Gonzales-McLinn - In September 2015 she was sentenced to 50 years to life in prison after she brutally murdered her boss and friend Harold Sasko, after she moved in with him to deal with some personal issues. In May 2021 she was re-sentenced to 25 years to life after it was deemed that she received ineffective counsel during her trial.
