= Wichita Massacre =

2000 series of crimes in Wichita, Kansas

- Location: Wichita, Kansas, U.S.
- Date: December 8–15, 2000
- Attack type: Spree killing, robbery, rape, kidnapping, mass murder
- Weapon: Lorcin L-380 pistols
- Deaths: 5 (includes 1 death post-attack resulting from injuries sustained)
- Injuries: 2
- Perpetrators: Jonathan Carr; Reginald Carr

The Wichita Massacre, also known as the Wichita Horror, was a week-long violent crime spree perpetrated by brothers Reginald and Jonathan Carr, in the city of Wichita, Kansas, from December 8 to 15, 2000. Five people were killed, and two people, a man and a woman, were severely wounded. The brothers were arrested and convicted of multiple counts of murder, kidnapping, robbery, and rape. They were both sentenced to death in October 2002. Their crimes created panic in the Wichita area, resulting in an increase in the sales of guns, locks, and home security systems.

The case has received significant attention because the killers' death sentences have been subject to various rulings related to the use of executions in Kansas. In 2004, the Kansas Supreme Court overturned the state's death penalty law, but the Kansas Attorney General appealed to the US Supreme Court, which upheld the constitutionality of the death penalty in Kansas.

In July 2014, the Kansas Supreme Court again overturned the Carrs' death sentences on a legal technicality relating to their original trial judge not giving each brother a separate penalty proceeding. After an appeal by the state's attorney general to the US Supreme Court, it overturned the decision of the Kansas Supreme Court in January 2016 and reinstated the death sentences. The Carr brothers are incarcerated on death row at El Dorado Correctional Facility.

== Crime spree ==
The Carr brothers were from Dodge City, Kansas. Reginald Dexter Carr Jr. was born on November 14, 1977. Jonathan Daniel Carr was born on March 30, 1980. At the time of the Wichita Massacre, both 23-year-old Reginald and 20-year-old Jonathan had lengthy criminal records.

On December 8, 2000, having recently arrived in Wichita, the brothers robbed and wounded 23-year-old Andrew Schreiber, an assistant baseball coach. Three days later, on December 11, they shot 55-year-old cellist and librarian Ann Walenta three times as she tried to escape from them in her car, leaving her paralyzed. She died in the hospital on January 2, 2001, from a pulmonary embolism (blood clotting in the lungs) caused by her injuries.

On December 14, the brothers broke into a house at 12727 East Birchwood Drive in Wichita. Inside the property, which they had chosen at random, were Brad Heyka, Heather Muller, Aaron Sander, Jason Befort, and his girlfriend, a young woman identified as "Holly G." Heyka was a director of finance with a local financial services company, Muller was a local preschool teacher, Sander was a former financial analyst who had been studying to become a priest, Befort was a local high school teacher, and Holly G. was a teacher.

The Carrs searched the house for valuables. Befort had intended to propose to Holly, and she found this out when the Carrs discovered an engagement ring hidden in a popcorn box. After burgling the house, the Carrs forced their victims to strip naked and bound them. The brothers then repeatedly raped the two women and forced the men to engage in sexual acts with the women and the women with each other.

After taking the victims in Befort's truck to ATMs to empty their bank accounts, they drove them to the closed Stryker Soccer Complex on the outskirts of Wichita, where they shot all five execution-style in the backs of their heads. The Carrs then drove Befort's truck over their bodies and left them for dead. Holly G. survived because her plastic barrette deflected the bullet to the side of her head, while the other four were killed instantly. She walked naked for more than a mile in freezing weather to seek first aid and shelter at a house. Before getting medical treatment, she reported the incident and descriptions of her attackers to the couple who took her in before the police arrived. She contracted a sexually transmitted infection from one of the perpetrators.

After the killings, the Carrs returned to the house to ransack it for more valuables. While there, they used a golf club to beat Holly's pet dog, Nikki, to death.

== Capture, arrest, and conviction ==
Police captured the Carr brothers the next day. Both Schreiber and the dying Walenta identified Reginald. The District Attorney said that they believed the motive was robbery. With the help of Holly's testimony at the trial, the brothers were convicted on nearly all 113 counts against them, including kidnapping, robbery, rape, four counts of capital murder, and one count of first-degree murder.

Reginald Carr was convicted on 50 counts and Jonathan Carr on 43. They were sentenced to death for the capital murders, plus life in prison, with a minimum of decades before being eligible for parole. Their cases were later appealed.

They are currently being held at the El Dorado Correctional Facility, where they have been held since November 2002. As of 2014, Reginald has 11 disciplinary violations and Jonathan has 23.

== Death sentence appeals ==
There has been continuing attention for the Carr brothers' case because of various rulings about the Kansas death penalty law and decisions by its high court on such cases. In 2004, the Kansas Supreme Court overturned the state's death penalty law, but the state attorney general appealed this ruling to the U.S. Supreme Court. It upheld the constitutionality of the state's death penalty law, which returned the Carrs and other condemned killers to death row.

On July 25, 2014, the Kansas Supreme Court announced it had overturned the Carr death sentences on appeal. The six justice-majority said they did so because the trial judge failed to adequately separate the penalty proceedings for each defendant. According to a release from the Kansas Supreme Court public information officer, the court unanimously reversed three of each defendant's four capital convictions because jury instructions on sex-crime-based capital murder were "fatally erroneous and three of the multiple-homicide capital murder charges duplicated the first."

The high court upheld most of the convictions against each of the brothers despite other purported lower-court errors. The court ruled that the brothers were entitled to separate sentencing trials, as "differentiation in the moral culpability of two defendants" can cause a jury "to show mercy to one while refusing to show mercy to the other." Even if the death penalties were not upheld, each of the Carrs was already sentenced to serve at least "70 to 80 years" in prison before being eligible for parole.

The Kansas Attorney General appealed the high court's ruling to the US Supreme Court, which in March 2015 agreed to hear the Carr brothers' sentencing case, together with another death-penalty case from the state. In January 2016, the United States Supreme Court (in an 8–1 ruling) reinstated the death sentences, overturning the Kansas Supreme Court, deciding that neither the jury instructions that were challenged by the Carrs' legal counsel, nor the combined sentencing proceedings, violated the Constitution. The Kansas Supreme Court affirmed the death penalty for the brothers on January 21, 2022.

== Criticism of media coverage ==
The victims were white and the Carr brothers are black, but the District Attorney held that there was no prima facie evidence of a racial crime. Based on the robberies, Sedgwick County District Attorney Nola Foulston decided against treating these incidents as hate crimes. Conservative media commentators David Horowitz, Michelle Malkin, and Thomas Sowell said the crimes were downplayed; they felt the national media suppressed the stories due to political correctness. Sowell, an African-American conservative, has said the media has a double standard regarding interracial offenses, tending to play up "vicious crimes by whites against blacks" but play down "equally vicious crimes by blacks against whites".

Years later, The Wichita Eagle commented that the deaths of four young black people who were murdered by a young black man eight days before the "Wichita Massacre" in 2000 received less general media coverage than the murders committed by the Carr brothers. In this case, Cornelius Oliver, 19, killed his girlfriend, Raeshawnda Wheaton, 18, at her house, as well as her roommate Dessa Ford, and friends Jermaine Levy and Quincy Williams, who were visiting the women. Oliver shot the men in the back of the head where they sat on a couch. The couple had been known to have a "volatile, violent relationship". The police arrested Oliver that day; he still had blood on his shoes.

Some members of the black community questioned why the murders of the four young black people was superseded by attention given to the Carr brothers' killing of four young white people. A relative of Wheaton asked, "How could one be any worse than the other, if the results [multiple deaths] were the same?" The deaths of Wheaton and her friends were characterized by Oliver having had a personal relationship with at least one of his victims, unlike the Carrs who chose their victims at random. In addition, the Carrs committed rapes, as well as other assaults and abuses, to the victims. There was no prolonged torture or sexual component in the Wheaton case. Oliver was convicted of the four murders and is serving a life sentence in prison, with no possibility of parole before 2140.

== Legacy ==
- Muller was a pre-school teacher at St. Thomas Aquinas Catholic School. The school established an annual award, the Heather Muller Love of Faith Award, given to a deserving 8th grade student in her memory.
- Walenta was a librarian and musician for the Wichita Symphony Orchestra. Her family established the Ann Walenta Music Scholarship/Fellowship at the university in her memory.

== Media ==
- Terror in Wichita: A True Story of One Woman's Courage and Her Will to Live by Paul F. Caranci, 2020

== See also ==
- Capital punishment in Kansas
- List of massacres in the United States
- Murders of Channon Christian and Christopher Newsom
- List of death row inmates in the United States § Kansas
