= 2014 Overland Park shootings =

Two shootings on April 13, 2014

- Location: 38.9069°N 94.6514°W; Overland Park, Kansas, United States
- Date: April 13, 2014 c. 1:00 – c. 2:45 p.m. (CDT)
- Attack type: Spree shooting, hate crime
- Weapons: 12-gauge Remington 870 Express Tactical pump-action shotgun; .38-caliber Arminius HW38 Handgun; 12-gauge Stevens 320 Security pump-action shotgun (unused; left in car); .30-caliber M1 Carbine (unused; left in car)
- Deaths: 3
- Injuries: 0
- Perpetrator: Frazier Glenn Miller Jr.
- Motive: Antisemitism; Extremist White supremacist beliefs

Two shootings occurred on April 13, 2014, at the Jewish Community Center of Greater Kansas City and Village Shalom, a Jewish retirement community, both located in Overland Park, Kansas in the United States. A total of three people were killed in the shootings, two of whom were shot at the community center and one shot at the retirement community. The gunman, 73-year-old Frazier Glenn Miller Jr. of Aurora, Missouri, originally from North Carolina, was arrested during the attack and was subsequently tried, convicted of murder and other crimes, and sentenced to death. Miller, a former Klansman, neo-Nazi and former political candidate, died in prison in 2021 while awaiting execution.

== Shootings ==
The shootings began at around 1:00 p.m. (CDT) at a rear parking lot of the Jewish Community Center of Greater Kansas City, near the entrance to the White Theatre. The gunman first fired a handgun at two men. One of the men managed to escape immediately, while the second man tried to flee in his car. A bullet struck the shoulder bag of the man's seat, but he escaped uninjured. The shooter then fired at two males, 69-year-old William Lewis Corporon and his 14-year-old grandson, Reat Griffin Underwood, who were hit by gunfire as they pulled into the parking lot inside their car. Corporon died at the scene of a shotgun wound(s) to the head, while Underwood died of shotgun wound(s) to the head at a hospital.

During the time of the first shooting, teenagers were inside the building auditioning for KC SuperStar, a singing competition. In addition, actors, crew members, and other staff were in the White Theatre preparing for a 2:00 p.m. performance of To Kill a Mockingbird. There was also a fitness program being conducted for children with autism, Fun and Fitness with Friends. This program consisted of 15 children with autism and 6 volunteers. The gunman was able to fire several shots into the building. The staff inside the building were the first to make 9-1-1 calls alerting the police. Multiple staff members, one with paramedic training and the other with military medical experience, attempted life-saving measures on the victims, but were ultimately unsuccessful.

After firing at several other people, but missing, the shooter fled in his car and opened fire at Village Shalom, a Jewish retirement community located a little more than a mile away from the community center. A woman, Terri LaManno, was killed in the parking lot, and two other people were shot at, but the gunshots missed both people.

The gunman was arrested at 2:45 p.m. outside Valley Park Elementary School by two police officers who identified him in his car using tips given by witnesses. As he was led away, he made antisemitic remarks, according to witnesses. A police official confirmed that the gunman used a Remington Model 870 shotgun in the shootings, and several other weapons, including a handgun, were also recovered from his car. Investigators were also determining whether an assault rifle was also used.

In a press conference, the Federal Bureau of Investigation stated that it was determined that the motivation for the shootings was antisemitism. Several items were seized from the suspect's home in Aurora, Missouri, including three boxes of ammunition, a red shirt with a swastika symbol, antisemitic publications (such as Hitler's Mein Kampf), a list of kosher places, directions to synagogues, and a printout of the KC Superstar competition at the community center.

== Perpetrator ==
Miller was arrested in connection to the shootings. Prior to his arrest, news reports described the suspected gunman as a man in his seventies who was not a Kansas native. Miller was an Aurora, Missouri transplant from North Carolina, a neo-Nazi, practicing neo-Pagan beliefs, and former politician who founded and formerly led the Carolina Knights, a paramilitary organization with ties to the Ku Klux Klan in the 1980s, with the organization later being disbanded by the Southern Poverty Law Center, after which he founded another group called the White Patriot Party. In the late 1980s, he was sentenced to three years in prison for weapons charging and plotting to assassinate Morris Dees, the leader and co-founder of the Southern Poverty Law Center. He previously served in the United States Army for 20 years, which included two tours in Vietnam.

Miller's most recent comprehensive interview was with David Pakman of the nationally syndicated The David Pakman Show. Pakman also appears to be the media figure to most recently have had contact with Miller, having released email transcripts from November 2013. Also, The Distorted View Show previously spoke to the suspect in 2010. In late March, Miller visited an emergency room and was diagnosed with emphysema, at which time he was told that he had a 50 percent chance of living three additional years. According to a November 15, 2014, interview with The Kansas City Star, Miller said he began planning the shootings following the visit. He also added that he believed he would die during the shootings and that he had frequently visited the Jewish Community Center of Greater Kansas City, including three visits that occurred hours before he first opened fire.

Miller was said by police officials to have purchased the firearms from a straw buyer, which enabled him to avoid going through federal background checks; he was unable to make personal purchases because of the weapons charges he was issued during his arrest in the late 1980s.

John Mark Reidle, a resident of Lawrence County, Missouri, purchased the shotgun for Miller (a "straw purchase") at a Walmart store in Republic, Missouri four days prior to the shootings. In June 2014, Reidle was indicted by a grand jury on federal charges of providing false information on a federal firearms form (Form 4473) in order to purchase the shotgun. Reidle is also believed to be responsible for the purchase of a handgun for Miller, apparently bought at a gun show. According to neighbors, Reidle and Miller had similar political beliefs, and Reidle flew a Nazi flag on Hitler's birthday each year.

In October 2015, pursuant to a plea agreement with federal prosecutors, Reidle pleaded guilty to the charge. Reidle was sentenced to five years of probation, including home confinement for the first six months of the probationary period; the judge in the case stated that Miller had taken advantage of Reidle's limited cognitive abilities. Reidle expressed remorse for his crime. Some of the families of victims criticized the leniency of his sentence and the government's lack of consultation with them.

== Conviction and death sentence ==
Two days after the shootings, Miller briefly appeared in court by video and requested a lawyer. He was charged with one count of capital murder, covering all three deaths because the crime was "part of a common scheme or course of conduct." Miller is believed to be the oldest person to be charged with capital murder in the history of Kansas. Miller was later also charged with three counts of attempted first-degree murder as well as additional counts of aggravated assault and criminally discharging a firearm at an occupied building.

During his November 2014 preliminary hearing, Miller's attorneys requested a competency examination. The request was approved by Johnson County District Court Judge Kelly Ryan after he expressed concerns about Miller's ability to assist his attorneys. The approval of the request drew outrage from Miller himself, who allegedly wanted a speedy trial.

In December 2014, Miller was found competent to stand trial. Prosecutors sought the death penalty against him.

On March 2, 2015, a preliminary hearing began to determine if there was sufficient evidence to proceed to trial. On March 3, Judge Ryan determined that there was probable cause for Miller to stand trial for three counts each of capital murder and attempted murder.

Miller told his attorneys that he would accept a plea deal where he would serve life in prison without the possibility of parole, as long as he was able to make a statement blaming Jews for all of his actions in court, as well as being in the general population of the prison where he would serve his sentence. Two offers were made by them, and the prosecutor's office stated that no deal would be offered in the case and it would go to trial.

At a court hearing on May 14, 2015, Miller announced that he wanted to fire all of his attorneys, insisting instead that he be allowed to represent himself. Ultimately, the judge agreed to Miller's request, on the condition that his attorneys remain as "standby counsel". Upon taking over his own defense, Miller announced that one of the witnesses he would be calling was actor Mel Gibson. At the end of the hearing, a trial date was set for August 17, 2015.

On August 17, 2015, jury selection began for Miller's trial. About 200 people were summoned. During the 11-day trial, Miller acted as his own attorney and made various disruptive outbursts, including self-incriminating statements. During the trial, Miller said that he was "proud" of the crime and made antisemitic diatribes. Miller tried to bring up his plea deal willingness but was shut down by the judge because no deal was ever officially offered and therefore the matter was immaterial to the proceedings. On August 31, 2015, Miller was found guilty of one count of capital murder, three counts of attempted murder, and assault and weapons charges. On September 8, the jury recommended he receive the death penalty. On November 10, 2015, Miller was sentenced to death by Judge Ryan. On 29 March 2021, Miller appealed the death sentence, arguing that the Court should not have let him represent himself, while also questioning the constitutionality of the death penalty. Miller died in prison on May 3, 2021, at the age of 80, while he was awaiting his execution.

== Victims ==
A 14-year-old boy, Reat Griffin Underwood, and his 69-year-old grandfather, physician William Lewis Corporon, were killed at the Jewish Community Center. Both were Christians and attendants at the United Methodist Church of the Resurrection in Leawood. A 53-year-old woman, Terri LaManno, who was an occupational therapist in Kansas City, was killed at the parking lot of Village Shalom, where her mother resided.

LaManno was also a Christian who attended St. Peter's Catholic Church in Kansas City, Missouri. Initial reports indicated a fourth person who was shot and wounded, but it was later confirmed that all of the people who suffered gunshot wounds were killed. Including the people shot at but escaping uninjured, only one person targeted by gunfire was Jewish.

== Reactions ==
U.S. President Barack Obama called the shootings "horrific" and said in a statement, "While we do not know all of the details surrounding today's shooting, the initial reports are heartbreaking." U.S. Attorney General Eric Holder also issued a statement in the wake of the shooting, saying, "I was horrified to learn of this weekend's tragic shootings outside Kansas City. These senseless acts of violence are all the more heartbreaking as they were perpetrated on the eve of the solemn occasion of Passover." Governor Sam Brownback issued the statement: "My heart and prayers are with all those who were affected by today's events. We will pursue justice aggressively for these victims and criminal charges against the perpetrator or perpetrators to the full extent of the law." Other politicians issued statements in which they offered their condolences to those killed in the shooting and decried the antisemitic motivations of the shooter.

The Jewish Community Center offered condolences to the victims' families on its Facebook page. Four days after the shooting, the Jewish Community Center hosted an interfaith service in the Lewis and Shirley White Theatre, called a "Service of Unity and Hope." Over 1,300 people attended the service, including U.S. Attorney General Eric Holder, U.S. Rep. Emanuel Cleaver and Kansas Governor Sam Brownback. Multiple faith leaders from the surrounding area spoke during the service, which culminated with a symbolic show of unity as the clergy, elected officials and members of law enforcement in attendance were asked to gather on the stage as three candles were lit in memory of the victims.

Prime Minister of Israel Benjamin Netanyahu sent condolences. "We condemn the shootings which, according to all the signs, were perpetrated out of hatred for Jews," Netanyahu said the day after the attack.

United States Congressman John Lewis put out a statement on April 14, 2014: "It is deeply tragic that such senseless brutality should occur on the eve of Passover, the time when Jews all over the world remember their liberation from slavery in Egypt thousands of years ago. Hate itself is a kind of bondage that poisons the well of the soul. Somehow we must finally learn that it can never be a meaningful answer to human problems..."

== See also ==
- Antisemitism in the United States in the 21st-century
