= Prospect Township, Kansas =

Prospect Township Butler County, Kansas
- Township
- Location within Butler County

- Location within Kansas
- Coordinates: 37°50′0″N 96°41′36″W
- Country: United States
- State: Kansas
- County: Butler

Area
  - Total: 84.38 sq mi (218.54 km^{2})
  - Land: 78.31 sq mi (202.81 km^{2})
  - Water: 6.07 sq mi (15.73 km^{2}) 7.2%
- Elevation: 1,391 ft (424 m)

Population (2000)
  - Total: 2,033
  - Density: 25.96/sq mi (10.02/km^{2})
- Time zone: UTC-6 (CST)
  - Summer (DST): UTC-5 (CDT)
- Area code: 620
- FIPS code: 20-57775
- GNIS ID: 474611
- Website: County website

Prospect Township is a township in Butler County, Kansas, United States. As of the 2000 census, its population was 2,033, because it includes the population of the El Dorado Correctional Facility too.

== History ==
Prospect Township was organized in 1872.

== Geography ==
Prospect Township covers an area of 84.38 square miles (218.5 km^{2}) and contains no incorporated settlements. According to the USGS, it contains four cemeteries: Economy, Foster, Pontiac and Sherman. The streams of Bemis Creek, Bird Creek, Harrison Creek, Lower Branch, Satchel Creek, Shady Creek and Upper Branch run through this township.

== Transportation ==
Prospect Township contains one airport or landing strip, Patty Field.
