= Francis Nemechek =

American serial killer (born 1950)

- Nemechek in 1977
- Born: Francis Donald Nemechek; June 29, 1950 (age 76); WaKeeney, Kansas, U.S.
- Conviction: First degree murder (5 counts)
- Penalty: Life imprisonment

Details
- Victims: 5
- Span of crimes: December 13, 1974 – August 21, 1976
- Country: United States
- State: Kansas
- Date apprehended: August 24, 1976
- Imprisoned at: Lansing Correctional Facility

Francis Donald Nemechek (born June 29, 1950) is an American serial killer, kidnapper, and rapist who murdered four women and a young boy in Kansas from 1974 to 1976. After attempting an insanity defense, Nemechek was found guilty of his crimes in 1977 and sentenced to life with a chance of parole, although each of his applications have been declined.

== Early life ==
Born on June 29, 1950, Francis Donald Nemechek was the second of three children born to parents George and Nathalie. Little is known about his upbringing, other than he grew up in Trego County and played football in high school. After high school Nemechek enrolled at Goodland Area Vocational-Technical school, where he was described as a top student. Upon completing the school, Nemechek applied for, and was granted, a job as a traveling service mechanic.

Nemechek got married and fathered one son. After some time, the two filed for divorce. Family members would later tell the press that mentioning Nemechek's ex-wife would throw him into rage. After the divorce, Nemechek's father helped him obtain a job as a truck driver. He would continue to live with his father up until his arrest. In 1974, he pleaded guilty to charges of disorderly conduct.

== Murders ==
On December 13, 1974, Nemechek was driving his pickup truck along Interstate 70 near Ogallah when he noticed a red Toyota driving along the same road, which held 19-year-old Diane Lovette, her friend 21-year-old Cheryl Young, and Cheryl's 3-year-old son Guy William Young, all of Fort Madison, Iowa. Brandishing his handgun, Nemechek shot out one of the tires of the Toyota, consequently causing the car to spiral onto the side of the road. Nemechek then abducted the trio and drove them to a farmhouse owned by an acquaintance named Joseph Faulkner in Graham County, where he fatally shot both Lovette and Young, and left Guy unharmed. However, due to the snow and freezing temperatures, Guy would succumb to hypothermia. Later that same day, Cheryl Young's vehicle was found abandoned. A month later, two trappers found the body of Guy Young, and responding officers found the bodies of Cheryl Young and Diane Lovette inside the farmhouse.

On January 1, 1976, Nemechek was driving along Interstate 70 when he attempted to shoot down a vehicle near Ogallah. The driver of the vehicle, Walter Wright of Colorado, and his four other passengers, including his brother Robert, sustained no injuries and reported the incident. Evidently, two weeks later police arrested Nemechek and he was identified by witnesses. He pleaded not guilty and a trial was scheduled for September. Nemechek was held on $20,000 bond which he posted.

On June 30, Nemechek abducted 20-year-old University of Kansas student Carla Baker in Hays. Having forced her into his truck, he proceeded to drive to a secluded area where he proceeded to rape, beat, stab, and fight with her until she died. He left her body in a wheat field. The next day, Baker's father Dick Baker discovered his daughter's bike, but finding no signs of her he reported Carla missing. Days later, around 100 local volunteers took part in a search to find Carla, in which they scoured local wooded areas for clues, but none were found. Her body would be found on September 21.

On August 21, Nemechek abducted 16-year-old Paula Fabrizius, an Ellis High School student and Rangerette. He drove her to a secluded area near Castle Rock, where he raped and stabbed her to death. He then mutilated her body, and it was found the next day by a group of motorcyclists.

== Arrest and trial ==
On August 24, Nemechek was arrested at his job for the murder of Fabrizius. He had been arrested due to the fact he was identified as the last person seen with Fabrizus and his fingerprints also linked him to the crime scene. By the time of his arrest, the murders of Fabrizius, Baker, Lovette, Cheryl Young and Guy Young were being investigated as possibly being linked to a serial killer. Nemechek was held at $250,000 bail. While he was being held in jail, a Trego County judge issued a gag order, which was going to investigate Nemechek in the other murders. Police issued a warrant to search through Nemechek's camper, and they uncovered a blood-soaked carpet which he had likely used to clean up blood evidence, and photos he took of the bodies. In October 1976, he was charged with the five murders.

Since the news of Nemechek's arrest became a big news story, multiple rumors started spreading around in the area, among them was that Nemechek likely perpetrated the rape and murder of 23-year-old high school teacher Linda Leebrick in Hill City in April 1976; however, the KBI were able to disprove this claim as another man, Dennis Sanders, had already confessed to the murder. They also stated that there was no evidence to suggest Nemechek committed more murders than the five he was charged with. Nemechek confessed to authorities that he killed all five, but claimed he was not criminally responsible, and he pleaded not guilty by reason of insanity.

The following year, Nemechek went on trial for the five murders. His lawyers admitted early on that Nemechek had committed the murders but argued that he was unaware of the nature of his crimes. After four hours of deliberating, the jury found Nemechek criminally responsible, imposing a guilty verdict. He was then sentenced to life in prison with a chance of parole after 15 years.

== Aftermath ==
In 1978, Nemechek attempted to appeal his sentence on the grounds of him claiming to be criminally insane, but the Kansas Supreme Court upheld the sentence. Nemechek became eligible for parole in 1991. He filed a parole application in early July, but after a meeting with the parole board, his request was denied. Due to this, Nemechek would have to wait at least three more years for another parole opportunity. In 1997, he applied for parole but was again denied. Another parole attempt was made in 2007, but with a community petition having almost 15,000 signatures opposing his release, Nemechek was again denied parole. In 2012, Nemechek was featured in the book "Beyond Cold Blood: The KBI from Ma Barker to BTK" as among one of Kansas' most infamous criminals along with Dennis Rader, Ma Barker, Pretty Boy Floyd, and the Clutter family murders. In 2017, Nemechek became eligible for parole. He was denied. Nemechek earliest possible parole date is set for July 26, 2027. If it is granted, Nemechek would be 77 years old.

== See also ==
- List of serial killers in the United States
