= Lansing Correctional Facility =

Prison in Kansas, U.S.

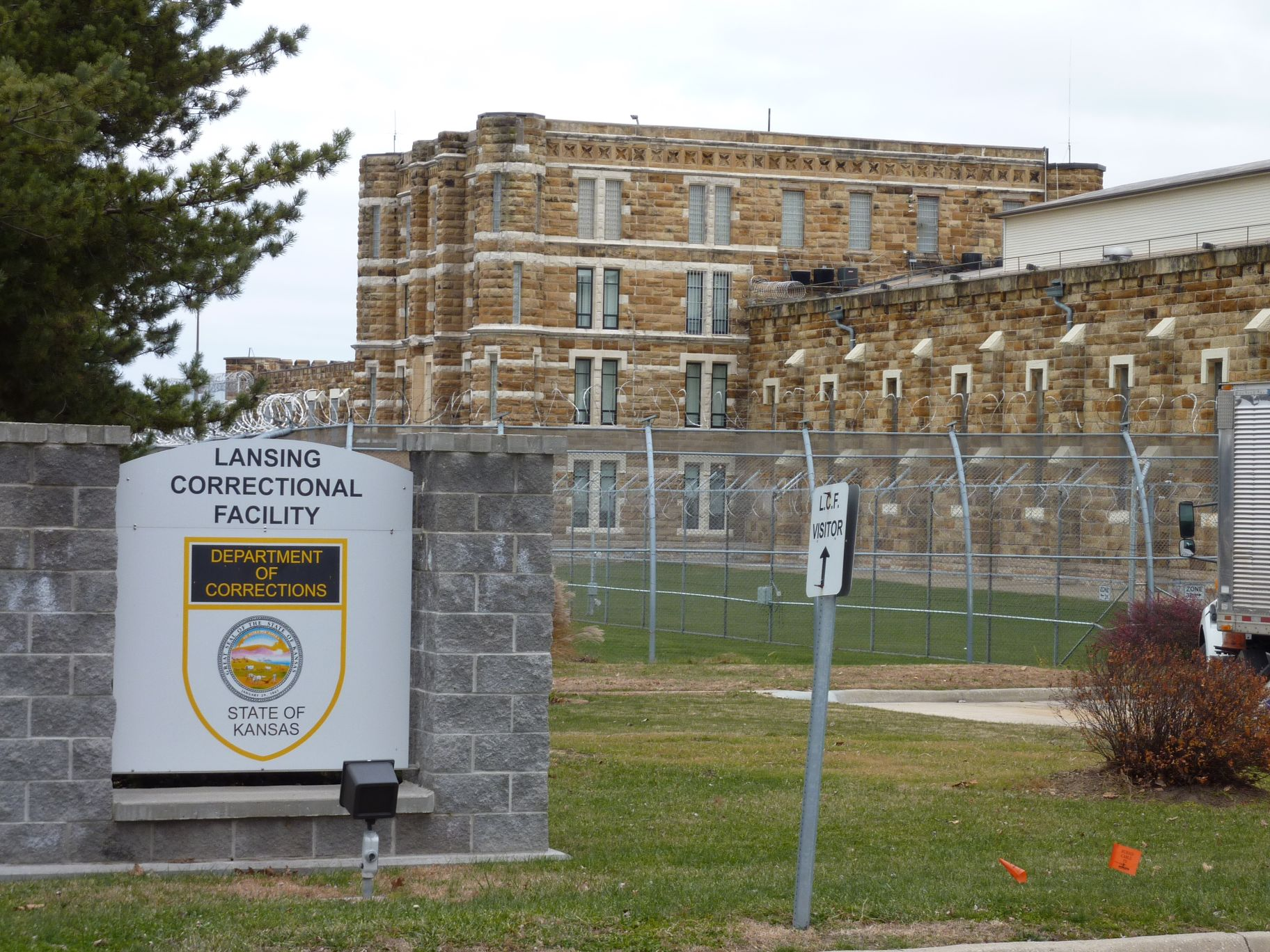
- Pre-2020 prison from southwest
- Interactive map of Lansing Correctional Facility
- Location: Lansing, Kansas; 39.2511°N 94.8936°W
- Status: Open
- Security class: Maximum, Medium, Minimum
- Capacity: 2,489
- Opened: July, 1868

Lansing Correctional Facility (LCF) is a state prison operated by the Kansas Department of Corrections. LCF is located in Lansing, Kansas, in Leavenworth County. LCF, along with the Federal Bureau of Prison's United States Penitentiary, Leavenworth, the United States Army Corrections Command's United States Disciplinary Barracks, and Midwest Joint Regional Correctional Facility in Fort Leavenworth are the four major prisons that give the Leavenworth area its reputation as a corrections center.

== History ==
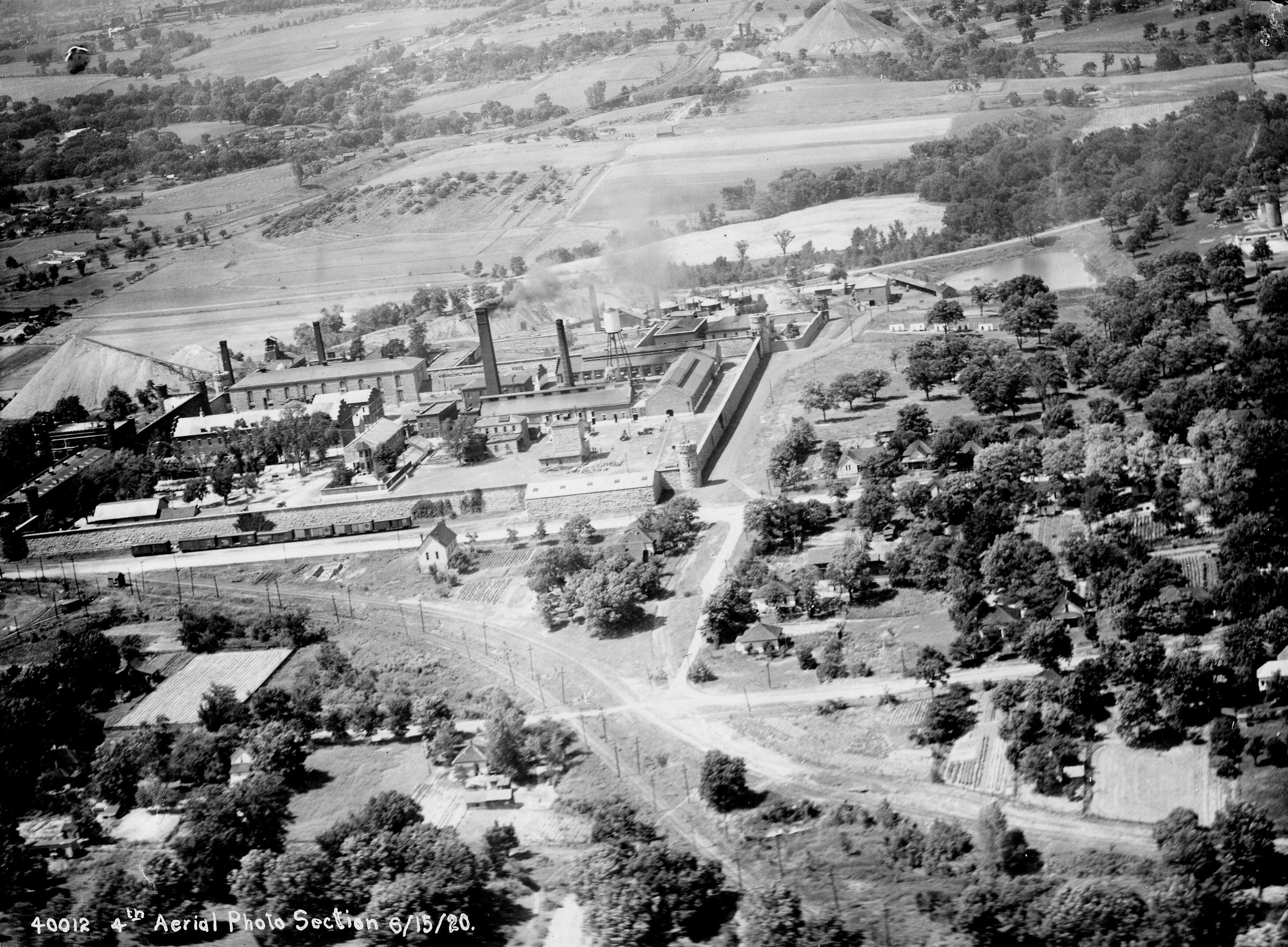
Prison in 1920

The facility was originally known as the Kansas State Penitentiary (KSP) and was built by prison labor in the 1860s. The name was changed to Lansing Correctional Facility in 1990. Construction of the cell houses was completed in 1867. The facility began housing Kansas inmates felons in July 1868 and housed felons from Oklahoma from 1889 to 1909.

The prison stopped admitting prisoners temporarily in the spring of 1896 and January 1900 as a result of the spread of smallpox in Kansas.

A New Cemetery for the Kansas Penitentiary at Lansing

Leavenworth, Dec. 6,1899
Warden Tomlinson of the Kansas penitentiary has a force of prisoners moving the "convict graveyard." This graveyard is close to the northeast corner of the main prison wall, and within a stone's throw of the women's department. It became necessary to use the ground and part of the clay in the graveyard for the new penitentiary brick plant. The work of moving the bodies has been in progress several days, and if the weather continues pleasant, it will be completed during the week. In all, 130 bodies of convicts were buried in the Kansas penitentiary graveyard. Everybody except one is that of a convict. The exception is that of a stranger who died near the prison walls where he was trying to seek shelter from the cold two years ago. The new graveyard is on a ridge a quarter of a mile southeast of the prison walls, and is a beautiful place overlooking the surrounding country.

(Kansas City Star ~ December 6, 1899)

Previously the prison's "East Unit" had women inmates, but at a later point Topeka Correctional Facility took the women inmates instead.

The current main facility opened in 2020, and the Lansing Historical Society and Museum took possession of the old main facility in 2024.

During the COVID-19 pandemic, the facility was unable to control spread of the virus. On April 9, inmates began to riot citing the lack of health care. Reports indicated the inmates were armed with edged weapons. Video of the unrest reached the national media. By April 29, two prisoners had died of the disease. In late April, large-scale testing began indicating over three-quarters of the inmates were infected. The Department of Corrections asked the governor to release prisoners near the end of their sentences in order provide some level of social distancing. Governor of Kansas Laura Kelly took no action.

== Facilities ==
LCF consists of two units with different levels of security. The Central Unit includes an 11-acre (45,000 m^{2}) maximum security facility and a 46-acre (190,000 m^{2}) medium security facility. The East Unit includes an 85-acre (340,000 m^{2}) minimum security facility.

Lansing Correctional Facility East A detailed description

Known locally as "The Hill" due to its location on top of the higher terrain east of Lansing Correctional Facility main compound. It comprises 10 structures. The dorms or units "R", "S", "T", "W", and "X". The designation of "S dorm" and "X Unit" are used to reduce confusion in radio traffic. Each inmate is required to wear a color-coded ID card at all times; staff can quickly identify in which dorm an inmate lives by the ID color.

DORMS: "S" & "W" Each share the same basic layout of 2 floors, 96 inmates housed in a dormitory setting of 48 per floor. Each Floor separated by a Dayroom and shower area. Each side houses 24 inmates in 6 cubicles of 4 inmates each. Inmates have access to T.V. at their bunks if they can purchase one from the canteen/property or in the Dayroom. All entertainment devices require use of personal sound equipment (headphones) This is only available to Level 2 and 3 inmates. "W" currently houses the "Brothers in Blue" program formally known as "IFI". "S" Is general population and has no special housing designation. "S" basement contains the compounds "Work Recall Center" where inmate workers who leave the compound for facility work crews or private industries are screened for contraband prior to leaving or reentering the facility. "W" basement houses the compound library that is handicapped accessible. This is also the location of the East Unit Minimum Maintenance Crew Office and Shop.

"R" & "T" Dorms. These are not laid out like the others and they are specially modified to accommodate services. "R" dorm second floor is pretty much standard with the exception of having individual shower stalls. "R" dorm first floor Houses inmates and a secured door separates them from the "Visitation Reception" area. This is where all non-disabled visitors are screened prior to entering the compound. During the week on Tuesday and Thursday Evening this area is used by the Staff an inmate workers to distribute property purchased by inmates or large mail not receivable by the normal mail system. "R" Basement houses the Crew 11 office and Bike Shop.

"R" & "T" also house mainly "private industry" or hourly workers. Hourly workers include KCI (Kansas Correctional Industries), Aramark Food Service, and a select few Facility maintenance jobs. Private industry inmates from East Unit include Impact Design LLC Warehouse, Heatron, Zephyr, and Laser Apparel. These PI jobs pay minimum wage and more and allow the inmate to pay fines and child support while serving his sentence. "T" also is where the Unit Team Managers office, Resource Center, and GED classroom are located. In the event that an inmate should lose his job he is moved out of these dorms to make room for other workers. "T" dorm because of its location is the only dorm to have air conditioning.

"X" Unit comprises 4 pods housing 64 inmates each. Pod 1 is known as the "dog run," as this is where the dog resocialization program is housed. This is also the pod that houses disabled inmates and their inmate aides.

Other Structures: Barber Shop and Sheet Exchange. Very much self-explanatory.

Admin building- houses administrative staff and classrooms for programs and reentry. Basement houses the East Clinic/Sick Call and the upper floors are offices and East hill Chapel. The admin building and Chow hall are physically connected, although clearly of different construction. In between is the inmate canteen, a small dining hall (mainly used as a classroom) and the main chow hall and kitchen facility. "T" dorm being located in the basement of the Chow Hall.

Phillips hall is the compound gym and visit center. A multi-use area that has a basketball court, concession area for visit and available to inmates during the week (Castle Cuisine). This also has a stage that is utilized for programs and entertainment from time to time. Out in front is the "outside visit area". This area has picnic tables and a small play structure for kids to play on during visitation.

Next to Phillips hall is the Annex Building that houses the "BIB" computer lab. Behind those is the compound Laundry that opened in 2012.

The final Structure is the East Control Center. This houses the central control and security staff offices (Captain, Lt, Etc.). In the "basement" of the control building accessible only via the outside is the Dilution room where all cleaning supplies to the porters are issued and the Recreational yard equipment room.

INMATE JOBS: There are too many individual inmate jobs to list. The general list is as follows with some examples: Utility work crews: mowing and clean up crews KCI: Farm, Warehouse, Finishing, Etc. Maintenance crews: Plumbing, Electrical, Construction, Concrete Vehicle maintenance and Heavy Equipment. Paint storage and Small Appliance Repair Communications (Cable, phone, security system repair and installations) Steam plant and Fire and Safety.

Inmates at East unit populate the Work crews of the Richard Christy Memorials Maintenance Complex located in the valley between the compounds. These crews perform maintenance in all areas of all 3 security areas and must meet security requirements before being allowed on these crews. This houses the majority of the maintenance and construction crew shops and storage areas. Also in this valley are KCI farm main farm area, K9 kennels for security, staff gym and the gun range.

East Unit has a yard with weight pit and track and a multi use field for sports. There are two basketball courts and a horseshoe pit as well. These units have since been closed down due to the opening of the newly built minimum facility as well as a newly built Maximum and Medium housing units built where the old medium once was.

== Capital punishment ==
Executions of state, federal, and military prisoners were performed by hanging at KSP until 1965. When the death penalty was reinstated in Kansas in 1994, it was determined that executions would be performed at LCF by lethal injection. No executions have been conducted since it was reinstated, although a lethal injection chamber was constructed in 2001.

Additionally, one male death row inmate is held at Lansing instead of at El Dorado Correctional Facility because multiple employees at El Dorado are/were associates of the inmate's murder victim.

== Programs ==
The InnerChange Freedom Initiative is offered at LCF. Since PrisonFellowship has withdrawn funding, the program has continued on under the name Brothers in Blue.

== Notable prisoners ==
- Lowell Andrews, murdered his parents and sister on November 28, 1958, a crime for which he was later executed.
- Harvey Bailey, cohort of Machine Gun Kelly.
- Emmett Dalton, sentenced to life imprisonment after 1892 Coffeyville bank robbery attempt with his brothers and other Dalton Gang members.
- Francis Nemechek, sentenced to life imprisonment for five serial killings.
- Perry Smith and Richard Hickock were convicted for the 1959 murder of four members of the Herbert Clutter family and hanged in 1965. The story of the Clutter murders and the execution of Hickock and Smith drew national attention as a result of the Truman Capote novel, In Cold Blood.
- George York and James Latham, a 1961 spree killer team, were the most recent individuals executed by the state of Kansas.
