= Hutchinson Correctional Facility =

Prison in Kansas, U.S.

Coordinates: 38°02′45″N 97°54′41″W

- Interactive map of Hutchinson Correctional Facility
- Location: 500 Reformatory Street Hutchinson, Kansas
- Status: open
- Capacity: 1784
- Opened: 1895
- Managed by: Kansas Department of Corrections

Hutchinson Correctional Facility (HCF) is a state prison operated by the Kansas Department of Corrections located in Hutchinson, Kansas, United States.

The prison was originally known as the Kansas State Industrial Reformatory (KSIR) and designed to house younger offenders. Construction on KSIR began in 1885, but delays prevented completion of the facility, which would not begin housing inmates until 1895. The name of the facility was changed to Hutchinson Correctional Facility in 1990, and today the prison houses an average of 1,830 inmates.

Low security inmates at HCF have the opportunity to work on several projects such as highway maintenance, cleanup and maintenance at the annual state fair, assisting various public works departments of the city of Hutchinson and maintenance at Cheney State Park. The prison also offers the Kansas Wild Horse Program, which trains wild horses taken from land operated by the Bureau of Land Management.

== Notable inmates ==
- Israel Mireles: Convicted of murdering internet model Emily Sander.
- Adam Purinton: Perpetrator of the 2017 Olathe shooting in which he murdered Srinivas Kuchibhotla, and injured two others.
- Scott Roeder: Convicted of murder for shooting Dr. George Tiller on May 31, 2009.
- Henry Lee Moore: Suspected serial killer, served a year at Hutchinson in 1910–11 for forgery.
