= White Patriot Party =

Former American white supremacist paramilitary organization

- Confederate battle flag
- Leader: Frazier Glenn Miller Jr.
- Founded: 1980
- Dissolved: 1987
- Ideology: White supremacist; Christian Identity
- Political position: Far-right
- Colors: None

The White Patriot Party (WPP) was an American white supremacist paramilitary organization which was associated with Christian Identity and the Ku Klux Klan. It was led by its founder, Frazier Glenn Miller Jr., through various organizational incarnations. In the mid-1970s, the organization was founded as the Carolina Knights of the Ku Klux Klan. It was involved in the 1979 Greensboro massacre, when a confrontation between Klansmen, Nazis and communists degenerated into a shootout and a mass shooting which left five people dead and twelve people wounded. The organization became the Confederate Knights of the Ku Klux Klan in the early 1980s and it became the White Patriot Party in 1985.

At a time when a poor farming economy existed in North Carolina, the group acquired support by blaming economic problems on Jewish bankers. According to some estimates, its membership might have been as high as 3000. On April 6, 1987, the group declared war against the federal government, which they called "Zionist Occupation Government" (ZOG).

The WPP collapsed after Miller violated an injunction against paramilitary activity and was convicted of threatening the civil rights activist Morris Dees. He was imprisoned from 1987 to 1990. In a 1988 sedition trial in Arkansas, Miller testified for the prosecution by stating that he had received $200,000 in stolen money from The Order and used it to finance the White Patriot Party's activities.
