= Kansas Department of Corrections =

Agency of Kansas, U.S.

Kansas Department of Corrections KDOC
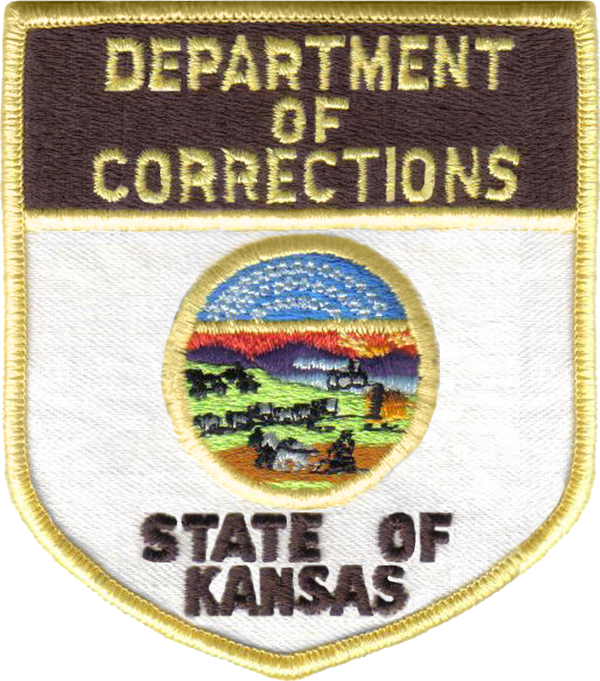

Agency overview
- Employees: 3,549

Jurisdictional structure
- Operations jurisdiction: Kansas, USA
- Kansas Prisons — green=state, red=private (Hover mouse over pog to popup clickable link)
- Map of Kansas Department of Corrections's jurisdiction
- General nature: Local civilian police

Operational structure
- Headquarters: Topeka, Kansas
- Agency executive: Jeff Zmuda, Secretary of Corrections

Website
- doc.ks.gov

The Kansas Department of Corrections (KDOC) is a cabinet-level agency of Kansas that operates the state's correctional facilities, both juvenile and adult, the state's parole system, and the state's Prisoner Review Board. It is headquartered in Topeka.

== Correctional facilities ==
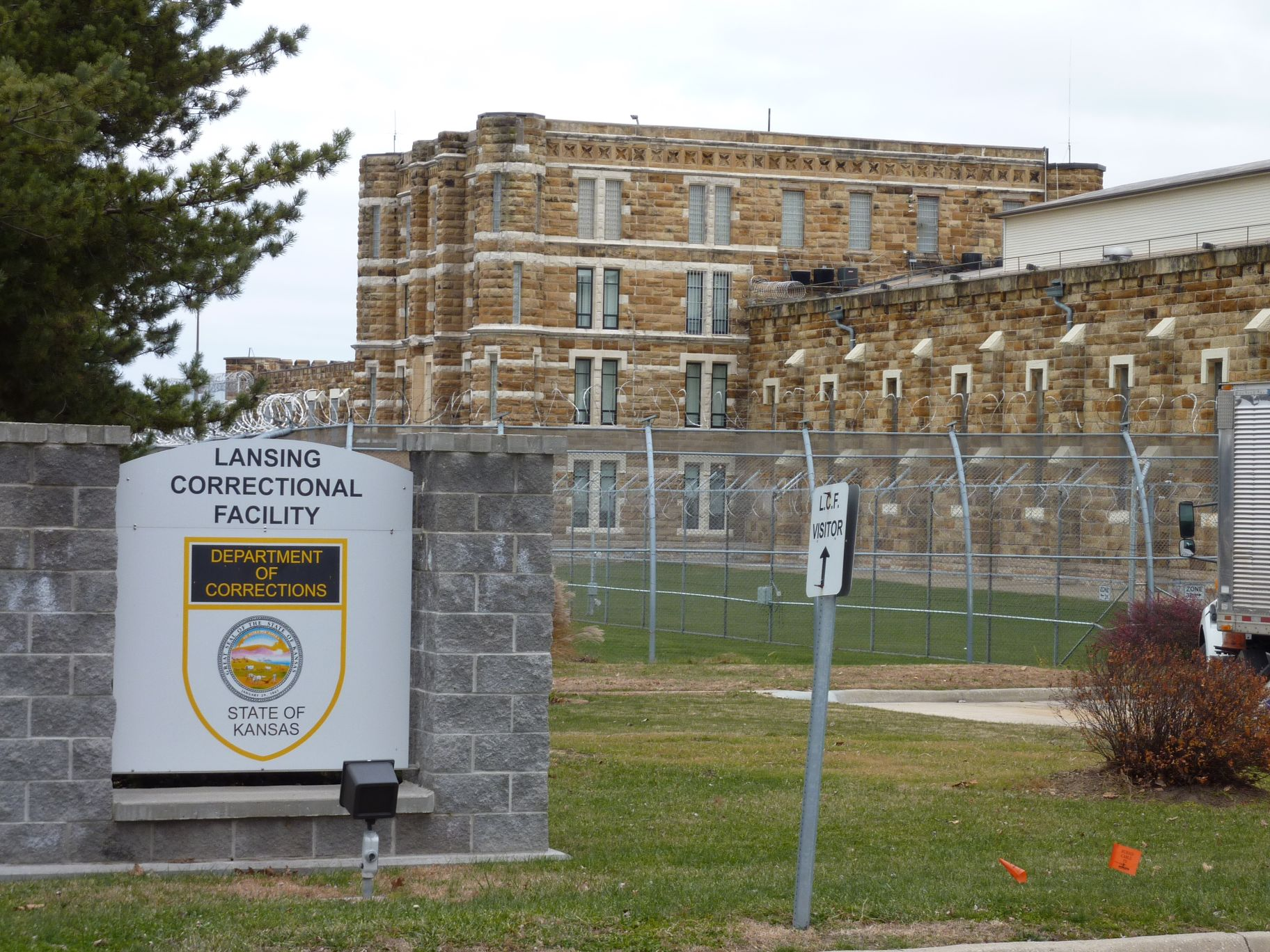
Lansing Correctional Facility

The Kansas Department of Corrections operates eight adult correctional facility sites, three satellite correctional facility sites, and one juvenile correctional facility.

- El Dorado Correctional Facility (inmate capacity 1,955)
- Ellsworth Correctional Facility (inmate capacity 913)
- Hutchinson Correctional Facility (inmate capacity 1,862)
- Kansas Juvenile Correctional Complex (offender capacity 270)
- Lansing Correctional Facility (inmate capacity 1,906)
- Larned Correctional Mental Health Facility (inmate capacity 626)
- Norton Correctional Facility (inmate capacity 975)
- Topeka Correctional Facility (inmate capacity 903) – women's facility
- Winfield Correctional Facility (inmate capacity 554)
- Wichita Work Release Facility (inmate capacity 250)

== Community & Field Services ==
The Community & Field Services division has two units: parole and community corrections.

== Victim Services ==
The Office of Victim Services (OVS) provides confidential support and information to victims, survivors, and witnesses if the offender in the crime was sentenced to incarceration in the Kansas Department of Corrections. Services provided include victim notification, safety planning, victim restitution, parole comment session advocacy, Victim/Offender Dialogue (VOD) program, facility tours, and apology letters.

== Kansas Correctional Industries ==
The department uses inmate labor to produce products such as office furniture, park equipment, and clothing for state government.

== Staffing ==
The department has suffered staff shortages for many years. In 2017, press reports indicated a turnover among KDOC officers of 46% per year. A 10% pay raise increased the hourly wage for uniformed employees to $14.66, but did not include non-uniformed staff. The El Dorado facility was authorized a staff of 682, but about a quarter of the positions were vacant.

By 2019, the department was forced to contract with CoreCivic to move six hundred prisoners to Arizona due to staff shortages. At that time, the department reported an overall inmate population of 10,002 indicating about ten percent of the population was to be moved out of state.

== See also ==
- List of law enforcement agencies in Kansas
- List of United States state correction agencies
- List of U.S. state prisons
- Prison
