= Home invasion =

Type of burglary

A home invasion, also called a hot prowl burglary, is a sub-type of burglary (or in some jurisdictions, a separately defined crime) in which an offender unlawfully enters into a building residence while the occupants are inside. The overarching intent of a hot prowl burglary can be theft, robbery, assault, sexual assault, murder, kidnapping, or another crime, either by stealth or direct force. Hot prowl burglaries are considered especially dangerous by law enforcement because of the potential for a violent confrontation between the occupant and the offender.

== Historiography ==
The first published use of the term "home invasion" recorded in the Oxford English Dictionary is an article in The Washington Post on 1 February 1912, with an article in the Los Angeles Times on 18 March 1925 clearly indicating the modern meaning.

"Home-invasion robberies" were highlighted in June 1995, when the term appeared in the cover story of The FBI Law Enforcement Bulletin in an article written by Police Chief James T. Hurley of the Ft. Lauderdale, Florida area, later republished on bNet, the online blog posted by Harvard Business School. Hurley posited that, at the time, the crime could be considered an alternative to bank or convenience store robberies, which were becoming more difficult to carry out due to technological advances in security. In the same article, Hurley recommended educating the public about home invasion. Before the term "home invasion" came into use, the term "hot burglary" was often used in the literature. Early references also use "burglary of occupied homes" and "burglar striking an occupied residence."

In 2008 Connecticut Congressman Chris Murphy proposed making home invasion a federal crime in the United States.

== Definition ==
Home invasion differs from burglary in that its perpetrators have a violent intent apart from the unlawful entry itself, specific or general, much the same way as aggravated robbery—personally taking from someone by force—is differentiated from mere larceny (theft alone).

=== Under US law ===
In some jurisdictions, there is a defined crime of home invasion; in others, there is no crime defined as home invasion, but events that accompany the invasion are charged as crimes. Where home invasion is defined, the definition and punishments vary by jurisdiction. It is not a legally defined federal offense throughout the United States, but is in several states, such as Georgia, Michigan, Connecticut, Illinois, Florida, Texas, Louisiana, and Nevada. Home invasion laws also have been introduced in the South Carolina General Assembly and in the State of Maryland. On March 15, 2011, a bill making home invasion deaths a capital crime in New Hampshire passed the New Hampshire House without debate.

Many U.S. states (particularly those that endorse the castle doctrine) include defending oneself against forcible entry of one's home as part of their definition of justifiable homicide without any obligation to retreat.

=== Other jurisdictions ===
Home invasion as such is not defined as a crime in most countries other than the US, with offenders being charged according to the actual crimes committed once inside the building, such as armed robbery, rape or murder.

In English law, offenders who commit burglary while carrying a weapon can be convicted of the offence of aggravated burglary even if the weapon is not actually brandished or used.

In Canada, section 348 of the Criminal Code provides that home invasion can be considered an aggravating circumstance in cases of

- Breaking and entering to steal firearm
- forcible confinement
- robbery
- break-and-enter with intent
- extortion

== Notable examples ==
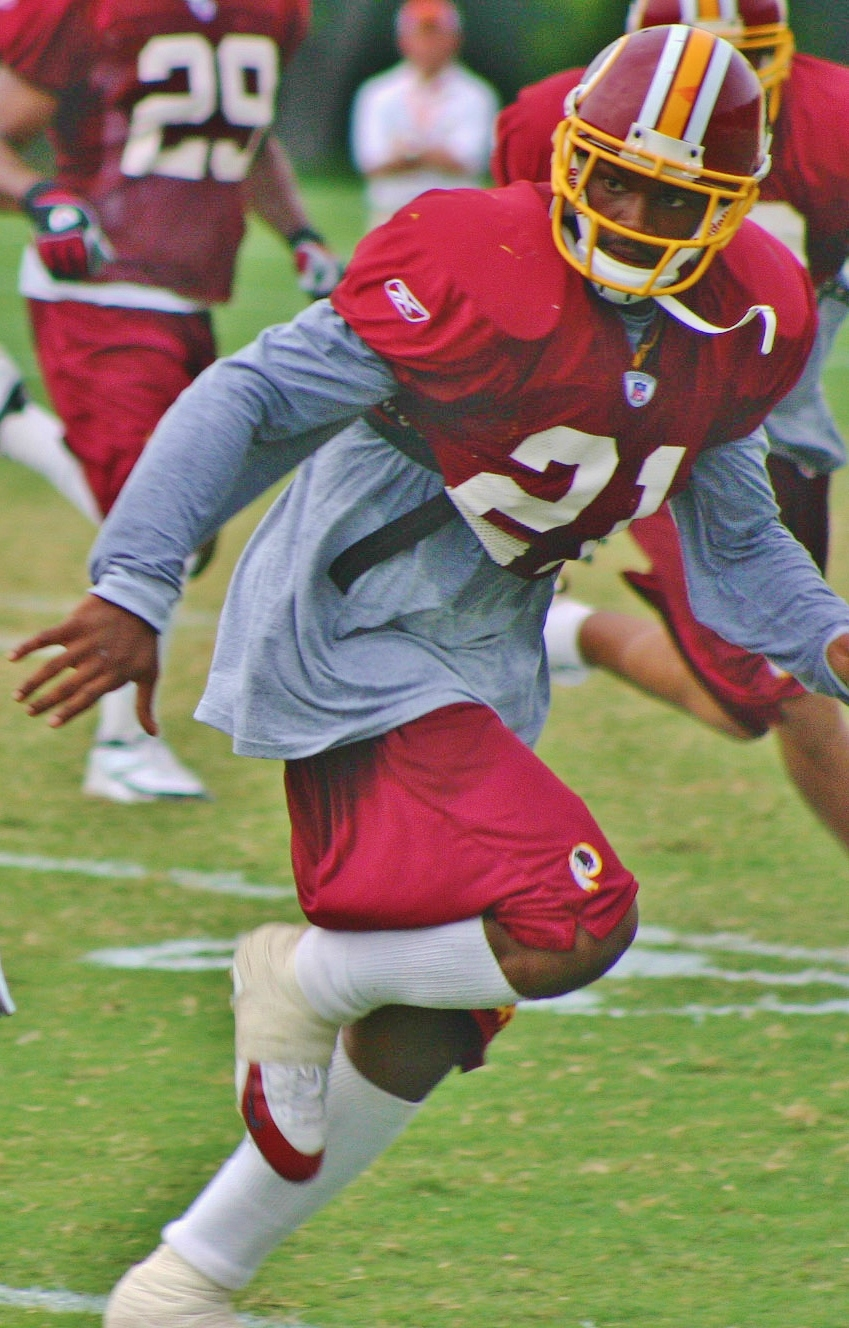
Sean Taylor, a University of Miami and Washington Redskins football player, was fatally injured during an invasion of his home in November 2007

The Lindbergh Kidnapping – In 1932, one-year-old Charles Augustus Lindbergh, Jr. was kidnapped from his family's home in East Amwell, New Jersey and later murdered. The offender perpetrated the crime by using a ladder to enter a second floor bedroom of the Lindbergh residence while the family was asleep.

The Chauffeurs de la Drôme (The Heaters of Drôme) were a gang of four men who carried out a series of attacks on remote dwellings in the Department of Drôme in south-west France between 1905 and 1908. They became notorious for roasting the feet of householders against the fireplace, to torture them into revealing the hiding places of valuables. Responsible for as many as 18 murders, three of the gang were executed on September 22, 1909. The fourth died on the penal colony on Devil's Island.

One well-known home invasion is the November 15, 1959, quadruple murder of the Clutter family by Richard "Dick" Hickock and Perry Edward Smith during a home-invasion robbery in rural Holcomb, Kansas. The murders were detailed in Truman Capote's "nonfiction novel" In Cold Blood. However, the perpetrators were convicted of murder, not home invasion.

The BTK Killer – Between 1974 and 1991, a series of sexual assaults and murders was carried out in the Wichita, Kansas area. In most of the attacks, the offender broke into or forced his way into a residence, then killed one or more people.

Joseph James DeAngelo – A serial killer and rapist who was active in California in the 1970s and 1980s, who is known to have murdered thirteen people between 1975 and 1986. His modus operandi was to break into the homes of his victims in the middle of the night and attack them as they slept.

The Night Stalker – A series of home invasion murders, rapes, and robberies plagued the Los Angeles, California area in the mid-1980s. In all, twelve murders were committed in southern California as part of this series.

Mr Cruel – An Australian paedophilic serial rapist who entered houses and attacked three girls in the northern and eastern suburbs of Melbourne, Victoria in the late 1980s and early 1990s.

Wichita Massacre – brothers Jonathan and Reginald Carr entered a house in December 2000, robbed the five residents, forced them into sex with each other and the attackers and then drove them to a snowy soccer field to be shot execution-style. One woman survived and testified against them in court, where they were given the death penalty.

Two paroled criminals were each charged with three counts of capital murder during a home invasion into the Petit family home in Cheshire, Connecticut, on July 23, 2007. During the invasion, the mother died of asphyxiation due to strangulation and the two daughters died of smoke inhalation after the suspects set the house on fire. The men were charged with first-degree sexual assault, murder of a kidnapped person, and murder of two or more people at the same time. The state attorney sought the death penalty against the suspects. The first defendant, Steven Hayes, was found guilty of 16 of 17 counts including capital murder on October 5, 2010, and on November 8, 2010, was sentenced to death. His co-defendant, Joshua Komisarjevsky, was convicted of all 17 counts against him in October 2011, and was also sentenced to death. Both men later had their sentences commuted to life without parole when Connecticut abolished the death penalty in 2015.

Another home invasion occurred on November 26, 2007, when Washington Redskins star Sean Taylor was murdered during an overnight home invasion of his suburban Miami home. Five men were convicted of the crime and given sentences ranging from 18 years to life imprisonment.

In December 2015, a man gained entry to a house in the Swiss town of Rupperswil. After forcing the mother to get him money, he raped her 13-year-old son and then murdered them and another son and his girlfriend, before setting the house ablaze. The man was convicted in 2018 of murder and other crimes and sentenced to life in prison.

Three men in Louisville, Kentucky were charged for the April 20, 2017 home invasion at Mallard Crossing of record producer Jonathan Hay and his teenage daughter.

Four people have been charged in the home invasion of Pop Smoke, who was murdered during the robbery in Hollywood Hills on February 19, 2020.

== See also ==
- List of films featuring home invasions
