= In Cold Blood (film) =

1967 film by Richard Brooks

Truman Capote's In Cold Blood
- Theatrical release poster
- Directed by: Richard Brooks
- Screenplay by: Richard Brooks
- Based on: In Cold Blood (1966 novel) by Truman Capote
- Produced by: Richard Brooks
- Starring: Robert Blake; Scott Wilson; John Forsythe; Jeff Corey
- Cinematography: Conrad Hall
- Edited by: Peter Zinner
- Music by: Quincy Jones
- Production company: Pax Enterprises
- Distributed by: Columbia Pictures
- Release date: December 15, 1967
- Running time: 135 minutes
- Country: United States
- Language: English
- Budget: $3.5 million
- Box office: $13 million

Truman Capote's In Cold Blood (usually just referred to as In Cold Blood) is a 1967 American neo-noir biographical crime film written, produced and directed by Richard Brooks, based on Truman Capote's 1966 nonfiction novel. It stars Robert Blake as Perry Smith and Scott Wilson as Richard "Dick" Hickock, two men who murder a family of four in Holcomb, Kansas.

Although the film is largely faithful to the book, Brooks made some slight alterations, including the inclusion of a fictional character, Jensen, a reporter (played by Paul Stewart). The film was shot on location at sites where Smith and Hickock's crimes occurred, including the real Clutter home where they robbed and murdered four members of the family.

In Cold Blood was released by Columbia Pictures on December 15, 1967. It was both a commercial and critical success and was nominated for four Academy Awards, including for Best Director and Best Adapted Screenplay, among other accolades. In 2008, In Cold Blood was selected for preservation in the United States National Film Registry by the Library of Congress as being "culturally, historically, or aesthetically significant".

== Plot ==
Told through flashback, ex-convicts Perry Smith and Richard "Dick" Hickock meet in rural Kansas in late 1959. They concoct a plan to invade the farm home of the wealthy Clutter family, as patriarch Herbert Clutter supposedly keeps a large supply of cash in a wall safe.

The criminals break into the family home in the middle of the night but are unable to find any safe, as Herbert uses checks. In order to leave no witnesses to their failed robbery, Smith and Hickock murder the entire Clutter family, cutting Herbert's throat and shot gunning his wife Bonnie and children Nancy (16) and Kenyon (14). Their bodies are discovered the next day, and investigations by the Finney County Sheriff and Kansas Bureau of Investigation (KBI) are launched.

Based on a tip by Floyd Allen, a former cellmate of Hickock, the two men become the primary suspects. The pair elude law enforcement by heading to Florida, traveling southwest across the country, and crossing into Mexico. After two weeks there they return to the United States broke and head for Las Vegas, hoping to win money gambling. Shortly after their arrival, Smith and Hickock are arrested for driving a stolen car, violating parole, and passing bad checks.

The Las Vegas Police Department and the KBI separately interrogate the two men about the Clutter case. Both Smith and Hickock admit to passing bad checks but deny knowing anything about the murders. The KBI attempts to scare the men into confessing, claiming that they left a witness, but this attempt fails. Next, the KBI confront the two with evidence, such as photos of bloody footprints matching their footwear. Finally, Hickock relents, confessing that he was present but that Smith carried out the murders. He begs for immunity from the death penalty. After Smith learns that Hickock has cracked, he confesses that he committed all four killings but maintains that Hickock was present as an active accomplice.

Smith and Hickock are charged with first-degree murder, found guilty on all counts, and sentenced to hang. After losing multiple appeals stretching over five years, with two reaching the United States Supreme Court, both men are put to death in front of witnesses.

== Cast ==
- Robert Blake as Perry Edward Smith
- Scott Wilson as Richard Hickock
- John Forsythe as Alvin Dewey
- Paul Stewart as Jensen
- Gerald S. O'Loughlin as Harold Nye
- Jeff Corey as Walter Hickock
- John Gallaudet as Roy Church
- James Flavin as Clarence Duntz
- Charles McGraw as Tex Smith
- Will Geer as Prosecuting Attorney
- Sammy Thurman as Flo Smith
- John McLiam as Herbert Clutter
- Ruth Storey as Bonnie Clutter
- Brenda C. Currin as Nancy Clutter
- Paul Hough as Kenyon Clutter
- Vaughn Taylor as Good Samaritan
- Jim Lantz as Officer Rohleder
- Donald Sollars as Clothing Salesman
- Sheldon Allman as Reverend Jim Post
- Harriet Levitt as Mrs. Hartman
- Mary Linda Rapelye as Sue Kidwell
- Sadie Truitt as Herself
- Myrtle Clare as Herself
- Raymond Hatton as Hitchhiker

== Production ==
=== Development ===
Richard Brooks, an acquaintance of Truman Capote, was given early drafts of Capote's book In Cold Blood before it was completed, as Capote was considering optioning a film version. Otto Preminger had initially expressed interest in directing an adaptation, but Brooks agreed to the project and purchased the rights from Capote for an estimated $400,000.

Brooks' screenplay followed the structure of the book closely, shifting between Perry Smith and Dick Hickock and the Clutter family, though slight details were included that were not present in the source material. In his adaptation, Brooks intended to demonstrate the "indignity" of capital punishment through an exchange between Smith and a jail guard that occurs at the end of the film, in which Smith asks to use the bathroom before his execution, fearing he will "mess himself" in front of onlookers. Brooks held personal beliefs against the death penalty, and on the crimes, commented: "I think the crime without motive is really what this is about. The crime itself was senseless, the boys' lives before that were senseless, and the end is senseless because it solves nothing." Brooks also included Jensen, a reporter character in the film who functions as a "Greek chorus" in the proceedings, which was not present in Capote's book. Capote would later admit he felt that the character's inclusion "didn't make sense". Brooks also eliminated discussion of two Clutter daughters, Eveanna and Beverly, who had not been present during the real attacks and had survived; they were reported to be "distraught" by the book and upset at the prospect of a film, so Brooks chose to eliminate them as characters.

=== Casting ===
Aspiring to recreate a documentary aesthetic for the film, Capote and Brooks insisted that they only wanted to cast actors who were relative unknowns. Columbia Pictures originally wanted big name actors Paul Newman and Steve McQueen as Richard Hickock and Perry Smith, respectively, but Brooks refused as he felt their recognizability and how beloved they were to audiences would render their performances less believable to audiences. Around 500 contenders were considered for the roles. Relative unknowns Robert Blake and Scott Wilson were ultimately cast, with Blake being cast in November 1966, and Wilson was cast as Hickock in January 1967. Blake had been a child actor and appeared in numerous films prior, but was not well known as an adult. The film marked Wilson's second feature and first major role. Wilson was personally recommended for the part by Sidney Poitier and Quincy Jones (the former of whom he co-starred with in In the Heat of the Night, scored by Jones).

=== Filming ===
Principal photography of In Cold Blood occurred over 129 days in the spring of 1967. Although the studio wanted to shoot the film in color, like most films of the time, Brooks insisted on shooting in black and white to mimic documentary realism, a decision that Truman Capote supported. In accordance with Capote and Brooks' desire to achieve as much realism as possible, some scenes were filmed in Garden City and Holcomb, Kansas at the locations of the original events, including the Clutter family's farm where the murders took place. The family who owned the Clutter house was paid $15,000 in compensation for the crew's four weeks of filming. The bus station scene was shot at the Union Bus Terminal at 917 McGee in Kansas City, Missouri. Scenes were also shot in downtown Kansas City, Kansas on Minnesota Ave. The shoot in Kansas was covered extensively by journalists from both Los Angeles and New York who visited the sets. Permission was denied to film in Kansas State Penitentiary, so interiors of the execution chambers were replicated on Hollywood sets. Exteriors of the prison were filmed at Colorado Territorial Correctional Facility in Canon City, Colorado. Leather straps for the execution scene were purchased from the penitentiary, as well as officers' uniforms. The actual latrines in Smith and Hickock's cells were also purchased by the production and implemented in the set.

Brooks' demeanor on set was noted as tempestuous by cast and crew members, with Wilson recalling that he was "focused [and] inspired" but "unpredictable... a volcano who was going to erupt at some point". Wilson stated that he was frequently yelled at and at one point nearly walked off the set. Blake recalled Brooks' presence: "Sometimes Richard would flare up and get nuts and crazy and start screaming at people, and people thought that was because he was an asshole. It wasn't that, he was just frustrated. He didn't know how to get what he wanted. But when he sat alone at a typewriter, that was the best part for him."

In the scene where Blake's character Smith discusses his father Tex (Charles McGraw) on the night of the execution, rain falls against the window of his prison cell. In rehearsals, cinematographer Conrad Hall noticed that the rain sliding down the glass was casting shadows on Blake's face, creating a visual effect that made it appear that Blake was crying. Hall pointed it out to Brooks and the blocking for Blake's character was changed so that the 'tears' would stay on his face throughout the scene. Hall, who was nominated for an Academy Award for Best Cinematography for his work on the film, called this effect "purely a visual accident".

=== Musical score ===
The score for the film was composed by Quincy Jones, who at the time had little experience with film scores. During the period, few black musicians were hired to compose scores for feature films, and Columbia Pictures initially pressed for Leonard Bernstein to compose the score, but Brooks insisted on Jones.

In preparing the score, Jones accompanied Brooks on a visit to the penitentiary in which Smith and Hickock were confined, and was inspired to use two acoustic basses throughout the score to represent the two killers' "demented minds". The score was completed throughout the shoot, with Jones writing new music to accompany dailies.

== Reception ==
=== Box office ===
With a running time of 135 minutes, In Cold Blood premiered in the United States on December 14, 1967, and grossed approximately $13 million domestically. The film earned an additional $7,551 during a limited revival run in the United Kingdom in 2015.

At the time of its release, it was rated "For Mature Audiences", which meant no children under 17 were allowed to see the film without parents or legal guardians of age; now the MPAA has rated the film "R", due to its violence and mature nature.

=== Critical response ===
Bosley Crowther of The New York Times called the film an "excellent quasidocumentary, which sends shivers down the spine while moving the viewer to ponder". Roger Ebert gave the film 4 out of 4 stars, writing, "At times one feels this is not a movie but a documentary where the events are taking place now." Charles Champlin of The Los Angeles Times put it on his list of the ten best films of 1967, calling it "an honest, sobering, revealing motion picture, earnest and authentic, with only minor lapses into theatricality. As the killers, Scott Wilson and Robert Blake were compellingly convincing." Variety called it "a probing, sensitive, tasteful, balanced and suspenseful documentary-drama". Brendan Gill of The New Yorker wrote that "the note sounded throughout is not that of Hollywood but of a scrupulous documentary. This documentary effect is greatly enhanced by the two young men who play the murderers—Robert Blake as Perry Smith and Scott Wilson as Dick Hickock. Each in his own way is superbly mindless and menacing." The Monthly Film Bulletin was less positive, writing that "since Brooks places his emphasis so exclusively on the killers, omitting the spectacle of the actual murders while lingering censoriously over the hangings, one fails to appreciate the real irony—the total arbitrariness—of the Clutters' deaths: they are too crudely delineated to inspire much sympathy, and in consequence the sympathy Brooks generates for the killers seems unbalanced and misplaced".

On Rotten Tomatoes, In Cold Blood holds a rating of 75% from 44 reviews with an average rating of 8.6/10. The site's consensus reads: "In Cold Blood is a classic docudrama with a fictional thriller's grip -- and a pair of terrific lead performances from Robert Blake and Scott Wilson". Metacritic, which uses a weighted average, assigned the film a score of 89 out of 100, based on 4 critics, indicating "universal acclaim".

In Cold Blood has been noted as an example of Hollywood new realism by critics such as Chris Fujiwara. Capote biographer Tison Pugh characterizes the film as an exercise in a "relentless pursuit of authenticity", and adds: "By putting his characters in the actual settings of their real-life counterparts, Brooks imbued his film with a reality both mundane and unbearable." Scholar Joel Black considers the film and its representation of real-life violent incidents "a form of psychological or social documentary".

=== Capote's response ===
Truman Capote was very satisfied with the film. He entrusted Richard Brooks with the adaptation because Brooks "was the only director who agreed with—and was willing to risk—my own concept of how the book should be transferred to film." When Capote visited the film's set, he met Robert Blake and Scott Wilson, who were playing the killers he had known very well, for the first time. Capote was so shaken by their resemblance to the real men that he "felt extremely uneasy in their presence" and returned to his hotel and drank an entire pint of Scotch whisky. In a January 12, 1968 issue of The Saturday Evening Post, Capote wrote:

Meeting them, having to be around them, was not an experience I care to repeat. This has nothing to do with my reaction to them as private individuals: They both are sensitive, seriously gifted men. It’s simply that, despite the clear physical resemblance to the original pair, their photographs had not prepared me for the mesmerizing reality. Particularly Robert Blake. The first time I saw him I thought a ghost had sauntered in out of the sunshine, slippery-haired and sleepy-eyed. I couldn't accept the idea that this was someone pretending to be Perry, he was Perry-and the sensation I felt was like a tree fall down an elevator shaft. Here were the familiar eyes, placed in a familiar face, examining me with the detachment of a stranger. It was though Perry had been resurrected but was suffering from amnesia and remembered me not at all.

After seeing a rough cut of the film, Capote recalled initially being upset about details that had been changed or added, but realized that if every detail had been exact to the book, the film would have been nine hours long. After the rough cut ended, Capote was disoriented because he had witnessed many of the events shown, including the executions of the murderers. Brooks was concerned that Capote would not like the film, but Capote thanked him for the work he had done.

=== Awards and nominations ===
Award	Category	Nominee(s)	Result	Ref.
Academy Awards	Best Director	Richard Brooks	Nominated	
Academy Awards	Best Screenplay – Based on Material from Another Medium	Richard Brooks	Nominated	
Academy Awards	Best Cinematography	Conrad L. Hall	Nominated	
Academy Awards	Best Original Music Score	Quincy Jones	Nominated	
David di Donatello Awards	Best Foreign Director	Richard Brooks	Won	
Directors Guild of America Awards	Outstanding Directorial Achievement in Motion Pictures	Richard Brooks	Nominated	
Edgar Allan Poe Awards	Best Motion Picture Screenplay	Richard Brooks	Nominated	
Golden Globe Awards	Best Motion Picture – Drama		Nominated	
Karlovy Vary International Film Festival	Crystal Globe	Richard Brooks	Nominated	
National Board of Review Awards	Top Ten Films		4th Place	
National Board of Review Awards	Best Director	Richard Brooks	Won	
National Film Preservation Board	National Film Registry		Inducted	
National Society of Film Critics Awards	Best Cinematography	Conrad L. Hall (also for Cool Hand Luke)	2nd Place	
Writers Guild of America Awards	Best Written American Drama	Richard Brooks	Nominated	

American Film Institute Lists:

- AFI's 10 Top 10 - #8 Courtroom Drama
- AFI's 100 Years... 100 Heroes & Villains - Perry Smith & Dick Hickock – Nominated Villains

== Miniseries ==
A 1996 miniseries was also made based on the book, directed by Jonathan Kaplan and with a screenplay by Benedict Fitzgerald. In that adaptation, Anthony Edwards portrayed Dick Hickock, Eric Roberts played Perry Smith and Sam Neill played Kansas Bureau of Investigation detective Alvin Dewey.

== See also ==
- Clutter family murders
- List of American films of 1967
- Capote, a 2005 film about Capote's researching and writing of In Cold Blood.
- Infamous, a 2006 film covering the same time period in Capote's life.

== Sources ==
- Black, Joel (2013) [2002]. The Reality Effect: Film Culture and the Graphic Imperative. New York: Routledge. ISBN 978-1-135-35432-9.
- Daniel, Douglass K. (2011). Tough as Nails: The Life and Films of Richard Brooks. Madison, Wisconsin: Univ. of Wisconsin Press. ISBN 978-0-299-25123-9.
- Pugh, Tison (2014). Truman Capote: A Literary Life at the Movies. Athens, Georgia: University of Georgia Press. ISBN 978-0-820-34669-4.
