= Alvin Dewey =

American police officer

- Born: Alvin Adams Dewey; September 10, 1912; Murdock, Kansas, United States
- Died: November 6, 1987 (aged 75); Garden City, Kansas, United States
- Spouse: Marie Bellocq

Alvin Adams Dewey (September 10, 1912 – November 6, 1987) was an American special agent of the Kansas Bureau of Investigation.

== Early life ==
Dewey was born in Murdock, Kansas, on September 10, 1912, to Alvin Adams Dewey Sr (6 September 1879 – 26 January 1948), originally from Illinois, and Nellie E. Dewey (née Butler; 21 August 1885 – 15 October 1968).

== Career ==
Dewey is most known for his role as the chief investigator of the 1959 murders of the Clutter family in Holcomb, Kansas, a case made famous by Truman Capote's 1966 book In Cold Blood. He worked to find the killers, Perry Edward Smith and Richard Hickock, in late 1959, before they were found on 30 December of that year in Las Vegas, Nevada.

Dewey had previously worked as a Kansas state trooper, as an FBI special agent, and as the sheriff of Finney County.

== Personal life ==
Dewey was married to Marie Louise Dewey (née Bellocq; 22 June 1919 – 6 May 2002) and resided in Garden City for most of his life.

== Film portrayals ==
Dewey was portrayed in the 1967 film version of In Cold Blood by John Forsythe, by Sam Neill in the 1996 TV miniseries adaptation, by Chris Cooper in 2005's Capote and by Jeff Daniels in 2006's Infamous.
