= Walker family murders =

Unsolved murder of two parents and two children in Osprey, Florida

On December 19, 1959, Christine and Cliff Walker and their two children were murdered at their home in Osprey, Florida. The case is unsolved.

== 1959 murder case ==
Authorities believe that 24-year-old Christine Walker arrived at the family's farmhouse around 4 pm on Saturday, December 19, 1959, where she was raped, then murdered by gunshot. Her husband Cliff, 25, then arrived with their 3-year-old son Jimmie and 1-year-old daughter Debbie. Cliff was ambushed and killed by gunshot. Jimmie and Debbie were then murdered. Jimmie was shot, and Debbie was shot before being drowned in the bathtub. The actual cause of death is unknown. News stories noted there were gifts around the Christmas tree.

Physical evidence left at the scene included a bloody cowboy boot, a cellophane strip from a Kool cigarette wrapper, and a fingerprint on the bathtub faucet handle.

A serial killer named Emmett Monroe Spencer confessed to the murders, but the confession was discredited by Sarasota County Sheriff Ross Boyer, who labeled Spencer a pathological liar. Spencer's confession was "determined to be cleverly constructed from real murders written up in newspapers and true-crime novels that he liked to read." In 1994, a bartender in Stroudsburg, Pennsylvania contacted the Sarasota County Sheriff's Office, claiming that one of her customers had boasted of killing the Walker family; this tip was never verified.

Police never identified a motive, and 587 people were suspects at one time or another. The case remains open.

== 2012 developments ==
In 2012, the Sarasota County Sheriff's Office began investigating possible links between the Walker family murders and Perry Smith and Richard "Dick" Hickock, who had been convicted and executed for the 1959 murders of the Clutter family in Holcomb, Kansas. The Clutter murders were the topic of Truman Capote's 1965 best-selling true crime book In Cold Blood. While that book devoted several pages to the Walker case, it dismissed a possible connection to Hickock and Smith, asserting that the two men had an alibi for that day. However, records and witness accounts collected by Kansas and Florida investigators show several factual contradictions in Capote's account.

The Sheriff's Office admitted that Hickock and Smith had been considered suspects as far back as 1960. After killing four members of the Clutter family in Kansas, 34 days before the Walker murders, Smith and Hickock fled to Florida in a stolen car, and were spotted at least a dozen times between Tallahassee and Miami. The pair checked into a Miami Beach motel, about three hours from Osprey, and checked out on the morning of the Walker murders. At some point that day, Smith and Hickock bought items at a Sarasota department store, just a few miles from the Walker home. One witness said that the taller of the two men "had a scratched-up face." The pair was arrested in Las Vegas, Nevada, on December 30, 1959, for the Clutter murders, and were executed by hanging on April 14, 1965. While a polygraph test appeared to clear them of the Walker murders, at least one expert has asserted that polygraph machines of the early 1960s were notoriously inaccurate.

According to Sheriff's records, the Walkers had been considering buying a 1956 Chevrolet Bel Air, the same kind of stolen car that Smith and Hickock were driving through Florida. It is therefore believed that Smith and Hickock may have gained entry to the Walker home on the pretense of selling their car.

In December 2012, Sarasota County investigators announced they were seeking an order to exhume Smith's and Hickock's bodies from Mount Muncie Cemetery, in the hopes that mitochondrial DNA extracted from their bones could be matched to semen found at the Walker home. Hickock's and Smith's bodies were exhumed and DNA extracted. Kansas authorities stated that they would process the DNA samples with active cases taking higher priority, and that results would take "weeks or months."

In August 2013, the Sarasota County Sheriff's office announced they were unable to find a match between the DNA of either Perry Smith or Richard Hickock with the samples in the Walker family murder. Only partial DNA could be retrieved, possibly due to degradations of the DNA samples over the decades or contamination in storage, making the outcome one of uncertainty (neither proving nor disproving the involvement of Smith and Hickock). Consequently, investigators have stated that Smith and Hickock still remain the most viable suspects. However, based on the personal items that were stolen, Katherine Ramsland, a forensic psychologist at DeSales University, finds Smith and Hickock unlikely and instead suspects that the killer knew at least one member of the Walker family. The Walkers' marriage certificate, which was reported stolen, had turned up among items given to Cliff Walker's niece by a relative in 2013. Said relative was later proven innocent through DNA testing.

== 2023 developments ==
New investigators of the case conducted further DNA testing on the stain found in Christine Walker's underwear in 2019. They identified two people's DNA, one female and another male, without identifying anyone specific. Another theory suggested that a neighbor, William Tooker, might be the killer, given his presence in the area and apparent interest in Christine. Tooker could not be ruled out as a contributor to this DNA mixture. Bodies of the Walker family were exhumed in 2023 to help elucidate the make-up of the DNA mixture.

== See also ==
- Freeman family murders
- Lin family murders (Australia)
- List of unsolved murders (1900–1979)
- Richardson family murders
- Robison family murders
- Sakamoto family murders
- Sharpe family murders
