= List of people executed in the United States, 1965–1972 =

Ten people, all male, were executed in the United States between 1965–1972, four by gas chamber, four by hanging, and two by electrocution. All of these executions actually took place between 1965 and 1967. The state of Kansas would conduct their most recent executions in 1965.

In 1972, the U.S. Supreme Court overturned the death penalty schemes following the decision in Furman v. Georgia. The legality of capital punishment was reaffirmed in 1976, in Gregg v. Georgia, with executions resuming in 1977.

== List of people executed in the United States between 1965–1972 ==
No.	Date of execution	Name	Age of person			Gender	Ethnicity	State	Method	Ref.
No.	Date of execution	Name	At execution	At offense	Age difference	Gender	Ethnicity	State	Method	Ref.
1	January 15, 1965	William F. Bowen Jr.	33	30	3	Male	White	Alabama	Electrocution	
2	February 26, 1965	Lloyd Leo Anderson	22	18	4	Male	Black	Missouri	Gas chamber	
3	April 14, 1965	Richard Eugene Hickock	33	28	5	Male	White	Kansas	Hanging	
4	April 14, 1965	Perry Edward Smith	36	31	5	Male	White	Kansas	Hanging	
5	June 22, 1965	James Douglas Latham	23	19	4	Male	White	Kansas	Hanging	
6	June 22, 1965	George Ronald York	22	18	4	Male	White	Kansas	Hanging	
7	December 10, 1965	Andrew Pixley	22	21	1	Male	Hispanic	Wyoming	Gas chamber	
8	August 10, 1966	James Donald French	30	25	5	Male	White	Oklahoma	Electrocution	
9	April 12, 1967	Aaron C. Mitchell	37	33	4	Male	Black	California	Gas chamber	
10	June 2, 1967	Luis José Monge	48	45	3	Male	Hispanic	Colorado	Gas chamber	
		Average:	31 years	27 years	4 years					

== Demographics ==
Gender
Male	10	100%
Female	0	0%
Ethnicity
White	6	60%
Black	2	20%
Hispanic	2	20%
State
Kansas	4	40%
Alabama	1	10%
California	1	10%
Colorado	1	10%
Missouri	1	10%
Oklahoma	1	10%
Wyoming	1	10%
Method
Gas chamber	4	40%
Hanging	4	40%
Electrocution	2	20%
Month
January	1	10%
February	1	10%
March	0	0%
April	3	30%
May	0	0%
June	3	30%
July	0	0%
August	1	10%
September	0	0%
October	0	0%
November	0	0%
December	1	10%
Age
20–29	4	40%
30–39	5	50%
40–49	1	10%
Total	10	100%

== Executions in recent years ==
Number of executions
1976–1983	11
1965–1972	10
1964	15
Total	36

Preceded by 1964	List of people executed in the United States, 1965–1972	Succeeded by 1976–1983
