= Huntington, Nevada =

- Ghost town
- Location within Nevada Location within the United States
- Coordinates: 40°16′35″N 115°40′33″W
- Country: United States
- State: Nevada
- County: Elko
- Elevation: 5,876 ft (1,791 m)
- Time zone: UTC-8 (Pacific (PST))
  - Summer (DST): UTC-7 (PDT)
- GNIS feature ID: 850845

Huntington is a ghost town in Elko County, Nevada, United States.

== History ==
A post office was established at Huntington in 1873, closed in 1904, reopened in 1923 and was discontinued in 1931. The community was named after Lott Huntington, a pioneer citizen.

The population was 54 in 1940.

== Notable person ==
- Perry Edward Smith, murderer whose crimes were documented in Truman Capote's book In Cold Blood, was born in Huntington.

== Places of interest ==
=== Sherman Station ===
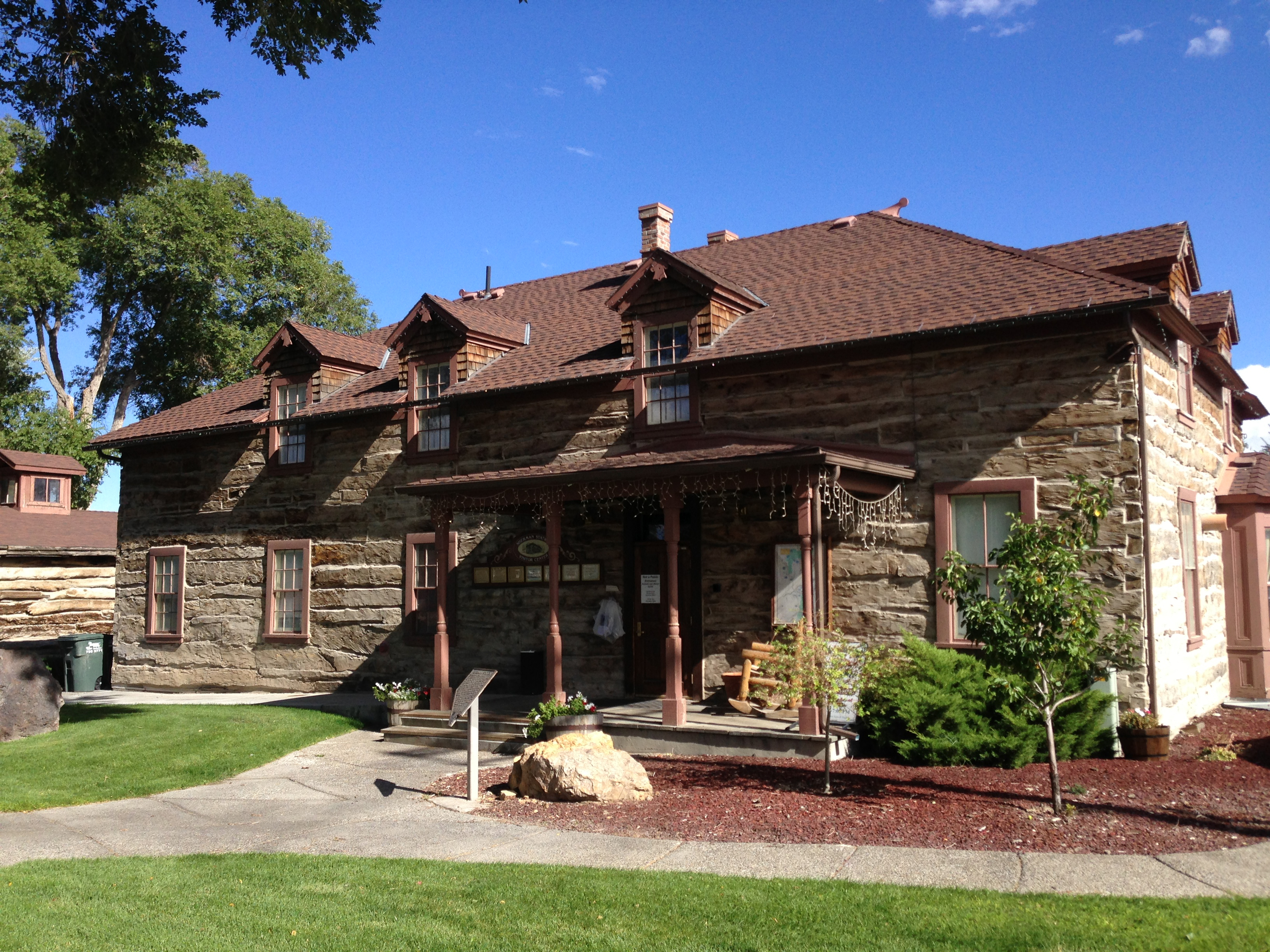
Sherman Station

Sherman Station is an historic building that was built in 1903 and functioned as a post office and stage stop. The structure was initially built in Huntington, Nevada and remained there until 1997 when it was moved to Elko, Nevada. Sherman Station was established by Valentine Walther, a German immigrant who settled in the area and operated a ranch that functioned as a freight line between Elko, Tuscarora, and Eureka.

The station ended up being closed down shortly afterwards once the Tuscarora mining boom started to decline. Although the Walther family left the area in 1922, the ranch continued its operations and, at one point, had Waddie Mitchell living there with his family while he was a child. Sherman Station can now be found at Elko’s City Park.
