= Infamous (2006 film) =

- Theatrical release poster
- Directed by: Douglas McGrath
- Screenplay by: Douglas McGrath
- Based on: Truman Capote: In Which Various Friends, Enemies, Acquaintances and Detractors Recall His Turbulent Career by George Plimpton
- Produced by: Christine Vachon; Jocelyn Hayes
- Starring: Toby Jones; Sandra Bullock; Daniel Craig; Peter Bogdanovich; Jeff Daniels; Hope Davis; Gwyneth Paltrow; Isabella Rossellini; Juliet Stevenson; Sigourney Weaver; Lee Pace
- Cinematography: Bruno Delbonnel
- Edited by: Camilla Toniolo
- Music by: Rachel Portman
- Production companies: Killer Films; John Wells Productions
- Distributed by: Warner Independent Pictures
- Release dates: August 31, 2006 (Venice); October 13, 2006 (United States)
- Running time: 118 minutes
- Country: United States
- Language: English
- Budget: $13 million
- Box office: $2.6 million

Infamous (also known as Infamous, Every Word is True) is a 2006 American drama film written and directed by Douglas McGrath. It is based on George Plimpton's 1997 book, Truman Capote: In Which Various Friends, Enemies, Acquaintances, and Detractors Recall His Turbulent Career and covers the period from the late 1950s through the mid-1960s, during which Truman Capote researched and wrote his bestseller In Cold Blood (1965).

Capote is played by Toby Jones. Sandra Bullock, Daniel Craig, Lee Pace, and Jeff Daniels also have featured roles, with a supporting cast that includes Peter Bogdanovich, Sigourney Weaver and Hope Davis, and a song performance by Gwyneth Paltrow.

== Plot ==
In late 1959, Truman Capote, a celebrated author, largely popular in New York City society for both his writing achievements and for "his wit and fashion flair." Openly gay and flamboyant, Capote spends much of his time with "the Swans", a group of aristocratic women including Slim Keith and Babe Paley, who share gossip with him. Unbeknownst to the Swans, Capote plans to use their gossip in a book titled Answered Prayers. However, Capote puts the planned book on hold after reading an article about the murder of a farming family in Holcomb, Kansas, in the back pages of the New York Times.

Curious as to how the residents would react to a brutal massacre in their midst, the author and his friend, Nelle Harper Lee, travel to Holcomb so Capote can interview people for a magazine article. However, once there, he realizes there might be enough material for what he eventually describes as a "nonfiction novel". However, his offbeat behavior both amuses and dismays the locals. The KBI's lead detective on the case, Alvin Dewey, is uncomfortable with Capote's dress and demeanor and refuses to cooperate. Capote eventually wins over the people of Holcomb with personal anecdotes about celebrities like Humphrey Bogart and ultimately gets the information he needs for his book.

Richard Hickock and Perry Smith are arrested for the murders and sentenced to death, but a lengthy period of appeals begins. Permission is given to Capote to interview them in their cells. He is able to convince Hickock to give him information about the murders in exchange for book royalties that could go to his children from a former marriage, but Smith is not interested in the idea of money, as there is no one for him to give it to. Capote repeatedly attempts to gain Smith's trust and fails. He empathizes with the convicted killer's unhappy childhood, and Smith's remorseful manner, artistic skills, and obvious intelligence impress him. When Smith learns that both of their mothers committed suicide, he begins to trust Capote.

Having been assured that he would be painted in a sympathetic light, Smith learns that Capote plans to title his book In Cold Blood, violently subdues Capote and threatens to rape him. However, Smith stops, claiming that he wanted Capote to feel betrayed, too. Later, Capote explains that the title has a double meaning, meant to refer to the justice system taking the lives of Smith and Hickok in cold blood. Capote tells Smith that if he does not tell his side of the story, he will simply go back to New York and write whatever he wants, and Smith will have no say. Once Smith reads some of what Capote has written, he realizes that Capote was being honest and finally discusses what transpired the night of the murders.

Smith confides in Capote that he is devastated that now that he has found someone to love, he cannot have him. Capote reciprocates his feelings, and the two share a kiss. The appeals take five years, during which Smith writes two letters a week to Capote. After the appeals are denied, Capote returns to Kansas to be present at their execution on April 14, 1965. Smith kisses Capote on the cheek and says "Adios, amigo". Capote witnesses Hickok's hanging, but is unable to watch Smith's death. He runs out of the building and breaks down crying in the rain.

Smith left all of his belongings to Capote, including the letters and a charcoal sketch of Capote that Smith had drawn. Nelle states her opinion that three men died that night, as Capote was never able to recover from Smith's death. The book is published and is a major success, turning Capote into one of the most wealthy and famous authors in the country, but it is the last book he is able to finish, as he begins a downward spiral of drugs and alcohol. The film ends with a distraught Capote calling Nelle and asking her to go out to celebrate a productive day of writing on his new novel. The camera pans to a notebook titled "Answered Prayers", with the page blank.

== Cast ==
- Toby Jones as Truman Capote
  - Zachary Burnett as young Truman
- Sandra Bullock as Harper Lee
- Daniel Craig as Perry Smith
- Lee Pace as Richard Hickock
- Jeff Daniels as Alvin Dewey
- Peter Bogdanovich as Bennett Cerf
- Hope Davis as Slim Keith
- Isabella Rossellini as Marella Agnelli
- Juliet Stevenson as Diana Vreeland
- Sigourney Weaver as Babe Paley
- Michael Panes as Gore Vidal
- John Benjamin Hickey as Jack Dunphy
- Gwyneth Paltrow as Kitty Dean
- Libby Villari as Delores Hope
- Gail Cronauer as Bonnie Clutter

== Production ==
=== Development ===
Douglas McGrath first conceived of Infamous as far back as 2000. He approached Christine Vachon of Killer Films with the concept, and she liked the idea and told him to write a script. McGrath wrote half the script before shelving it so he could write and direct Nicholas Nickleby. After that film was released, he returned to working on Infamous. After finishing the script, Vachon showed it to Warner Independent, which she had a first look deal with, and they greenlit the project immediately. The film was made on about a $12 million budget. For the role of Truman Capote, both McGrath's agent, Sam Cohn, and Ellen Lewis, his casting director, suggested Toby Jones on the very first day when they got the script. McGrath auditioned many actors for the part but realized Jones was right not only for his physical resemblance, but because of how immersed he was in the role. McGrath said: "We did end up casting him after a long, long search of better known actors where we auditioned and tested and met with lots of people who really wanted to play the part. But when I read with them — and they were wonderful actors — they always seemed like wonderful actors doing a very good impersonation of Truman. But they didn’t actually fully become Truman Capote. You never fully forgot who they were and accepted them as Truman — until Toby." Toby Jones studied Capote's mannerisms extensively and was able to get the voice right after protruding his lower jaw out just slightly, which he noticed Capote did. Woody Allen, who knew Truman Capote, introduced McGrath to Dick Cavett, who gave the production access to every single one of his interviews with Truman Capote. McGrath claims that he showed the film to a childhood friend of Capote's and she was so struck by Jones' resemblance both in appearance and voice to Capote, that she believed Capote was in the room for the first time since his death.

McGrath did extensive research and consulted a wide variety of sources for the film. He read Capote's handwritten letters and notebooks, interviewing his surviving friends from both New York and Kansas. McGrath's primary source was the 1997 comprehensive biography Truman Capote by Capote's longtime friend and colleague, George Plimpton. Plimpton created the book based on his own interviews with Capote, as well as his interviews with Capote's friends, acquaintances, enemies and critics. After completing his research into Capote's rise and fall, McGrath concluded that the cause of Capote's downfall must have been the toll writing In Cold Blood took on him, and decided that he wanted the film to primarily be centered on the complex relationship between Capote and Smith. Although most believe Capote's downfall began with the November 1975 publication of "La Côte Basque, 1965", a scandalous chapter from Answered Prayers, in Esquire, McGrath's view was not without support. Capote's colleague John Knowles told Plimpton that he believed that 1966 was the beginning of the end for Truman: "The execution of the two murderers in Kansas was a terribly traumatic experience for him. But I don't think there was any one turning point in his life, no moment when Truman's life turned around. If there was, it was the success of In Cold Blood. It was such an overwhelming success in every way, critically, financially, I think he lost a grip on himself after that. He had been tremendously disciplined up to that time. One of the most disciplined writers I've ever met. But he couldn't sustain it after that. A lot of his motivation was lost. That's when he began to unravel." This view was also held by Capote's friend Gerald Clarke, who wrote his own 1988 biography, Capote, which would later become the basis for the previous year's film of the same name, also about the writing of In Cold Blood. Capote told Clarke:

No one will ever know what In Cold Blood took out of me. It scraped me right down to the marrow of my bones. It nearly killed me. I think in a way it did kill me.

In a quote that stuck with McGrath, who referenced it on the DVD audio commentary, Capote told George Plimpton in a New York Times interview on January 16, 1966:

If I had realized then what the future held, I never would have stopped in Garden City. I would have driven straight on. Like a bat out of hell.

=== Filming ===
By the time McGrath actually started production on the film, Capote was also in development. Principal photography for Infamous began in late January 2005, just a few months after shooting on Capote had wrapped in November 2004. McGrath also insisted on an all-star cast because almost all of Capote's friends were celebrities in their own right, and having a cast of familiar faces would help immerse the audience in Truman's world where he was always around someone famous. Daniel Craig was a very late addition to the cast, as previous actors for Perry Smith, Mark Wahlberg and Mark Ruffalo, fell through due to scheduling conflicts. Gwyneth Paltrow's performance of "What Is This Thing Called Love" as fictional singer "Kitty Dean" was originally intended to be Peggy Lee. The situation of an audience being held spellbound by a performer falling silent in the middle of a song was based on a real-life nightclub performance by Barbara Cook. McGrath included the performance of the song as foreshadowing for Truman Capote's own love for Perry Smith, and by having the singer stop in the middle of the song, McGrath hoped to indicate that something in the song had moved her into deep thought about her own love life. An instrumental version of the song "Heartaches" plays over the opening credits, further foreshadowing Capote's complex feelings towards Smith.

=== Historical accuracy ===
Writer and director Douglas McGrath did extensive research and went to great lengths for accuracy. He set the Manhattan scenes in various restaurants that Capote frequented with his friends, and the sets were painstakingly recreated on a stage at an Austin airport to be as close as possible to the real locations Capote frequented. In the scenes where Capote goes to Dewey's office, both the outfits that he wears are accurate to what he really wore on those occasions. The film has been criticized for showing some scenes that were based on McGrath's "imagination" of how they may have happened, most notably a dramatic jail cell kiss between Capote and inmate Perry Smith (played by Craig). This was based on a rumor, as Assistant Director of the Kansas Bureau of Investigation Harold Nye told George Plimpton that Capote paid for privacy so the two could be intimate. Nye told Plimpton: "They had become lovers in the penitentiary. I can't prove it, but they spent a lot of time up there in the cell, he spent a considerable amount of money bribing the guard to go around the corner, and they were both homosexuals and that was what happened." Ned Rorem told Plimpton that both he and Capote attended a dinner hosted by Glenway Wescott in 1963: "Truman did most of the talking, describing his adventures in Kansas, and in particular describing the qualities both of mind and body of the two young murderers, one of whom, Perry Smith, he seemed clearly in love with." McGrath also noted that, while the intimate encounters in the jail cell were invented for the film, Smith kissing Capote on the cheek before going up to the gallows really did happen. Truman Capote himself relayed this fact in Plimpton's biography. This detail was also recorded in the diary of Sandy Campbell.

Joseph M. Fox, Capote's editor who accompanied him to Kansas for the execution, told Plimpton: "I sat next to Truman on the plane ride back to New York. He held my hand and cried most of the way. I remember thinking how odd it must have seemed to passengers sitting nearby - these two grown men apparently holding hands and one of them sobbing. It was a long trip. I couldn't read a copy of Newsweek or anything like that... Not with Truman holding my hand. I stared straight ahead." McGrath also cited the numerous letters that Smith wrote to Capote that were overtly flirtatious. According to Capote, Smith wrote him a 100-page handwritten letter that he gave to Capote just before his execution. Another scene that was criticized is when Smith attacks Capote in his cell after learning that he is going to title his book "In Cold Blood". However, in real life Smith was furious over the title, and wrote in a letter to Capote on April 12, 1964: "I've been told that the book is to be coming off the press and to be sold after our executions. And that book IS entitled 'IN COLD BLOOD.' Whose [sic] fibbing?? Someone is, that's apparent." McGrath justified these liberties by noting that the tactic is similar to how Capote himself wrote In Cold Blood, using creative liberties with real events for dramatic purposes. Capote took similar creative liberties with the story, notably by inventing a subplot that has Truman Capote withhold legal assistance from the convicts for the sake of the book's ending.

One other major difference between the two films is that Infamous shows Smith killing the Clutter men in the basement and Hickock killing the women upstairs, while Capote shows Smith killing all four victims. McGrath patterned the murder scene after what Alvin Dewey told George Plimpton: "He [Smith] admitted that he had killed two, Mr. Clutter and his son Kenyon, and then he handed the shotgun to Hickock and said, "I've done all I can do, you take care of the other two." Then, while the statement was being typed up, he sent word to me that he wanted to change the statement. I said, "Well, why do you want to do that?" He said, "Well, I was talking to Hickock and he doesn't want to die with his mother thinking he committed two of those murders. I have no folks, they don't care about me or anything, so why don't we just make it that way." I felt that his first statement, the one that he made under oath, was the correct statement." According to Dewey, Capote disagreed with him and believed that Smith killed all four for the simple reason that he didn't believe Hickock "had the intestinal fortitude to do it". In Capote's account, he quoted Smith speaking about Hickock's mother to Dewey: "She's a real sweet person. It might be some comfort to her to know Dick never pulled the trigger. None of it would have happened without him, in a way it was mostly his fault, but the fact remains I'm the one that killed them." Both Smith and Hickock refused to testify in court, leading to a lack of an official record detailing who killed the women. For this reason, the film In Cold Blood showed Smith killing the men in the basement but left it ambiguous as to which man killed the women upstairs.

== Release ==
Infamous premiered at the August 2006 Venice Film Festival. Upon its release, the film was largely overshadowed by Capote, released on September 30, 2005. McGrath finished editing the film in October 2005, just after Capote premiered in theaters. McGrath decided that the best course of action was to push the film's release date back by a year to avoid having "dueling Capotes" in the theaters. McGrath had not even seen Capote when his film was released a year later in 2006, saying: "I haven't seen their film yet. I want to see it when everything's done and I can enjoy it and judge it more fairly. And also because I don’t want people saying, 'Did you think your person's better than their person and that this is better than that?' because I like and admire those people very much and I don’t want to ever have to be critical. Also, I expect that I will like and enjoy it very much. But my impression is that they are different enough so that people don’t feel like they’re seeing the same movie again. In a funny way, what we're hearing from people is that they actually enjoy seeing how two entirely different movies can be gotten out of the same period in someone's life."

Infamous differs from the earlier Capote in that it occasionally breaks away from the Kansas setting to allow Capote's Manhattan society friends and professional acquaintances to comment on and express opinions about him to an unseen interlocutor during mock interviews based on quotations from Plimpton's biography. It also is more explicit about the romantic feelings Capote and Perry Smith may have shared.

The film's original title alternated between Have You Heard? and Every Word is True, the latter referencing how Capote often swore that "every word" of that book is true". Ironically, this claim was untrue, as Capote embellished the true story behind In Cold Blood considerably and even fabricated some instances for dramatic effect. Warner changed the film's title to Infamous, a decision that McGrath was upset with, as he wanted to call the film "Every Word is True".

== Reception ==
=== Critical reception ===
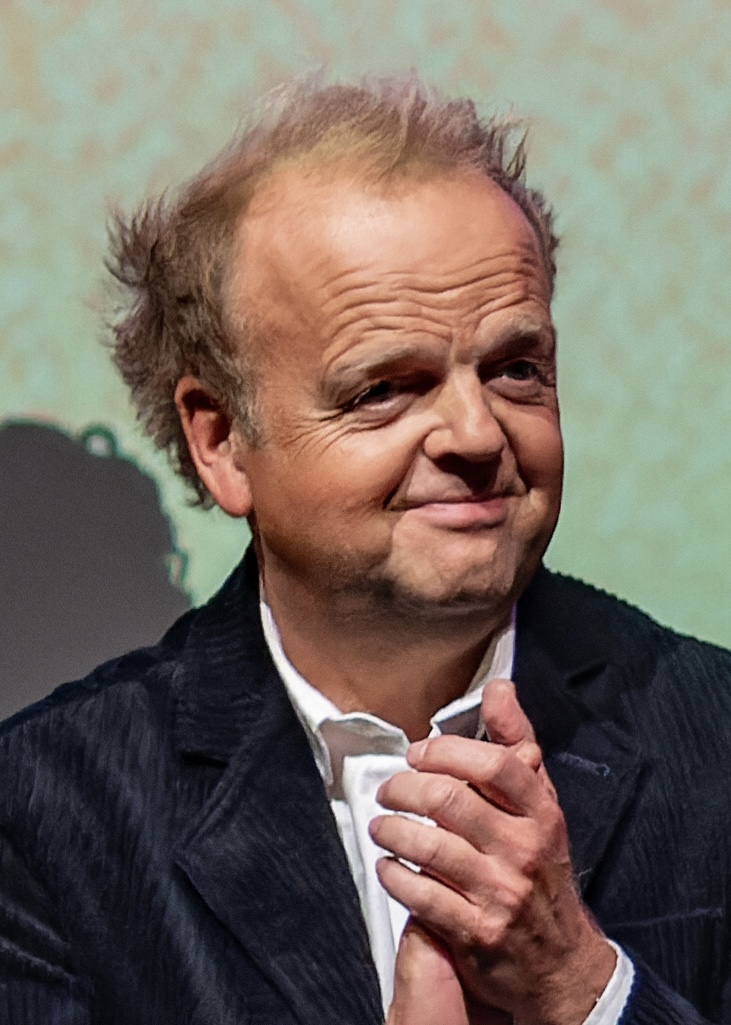
Toby Jones's performance was praised and renowned film critic Rex Reed wrote, "they gave the Oscar to the wrong Truman Capote."

The review aggregator website Rotten Tomatoes reported a 75% approval rating with an average rating of 6.7/10 based on 154 reviews. The website's consensus reads, "Though comparisons with last year's Capote may be inevitable, Infamous takes a different angle in its depiction of the author, and stands up well enough on its own." On Metacritic, the film achieved an average score of 68 out of 100, based on 34 critics, signifying "generally favorable" reviews. Much of the critical discussion of the film focused on comparisons with the previous year's Capote, which had received considerable critical acclaim and for which Philip Seymour Hoffman had won the Academy Award for Best Actor for his performance as Capote. In comparing this film to Capote, David Thomson of The Independent asked, "What does it have that's different? ... [It] has a gallery of Truman Capote's Manhattan friends, people who adored him without ever quite trusting him ... These cameos give a tone-perfect sense of Capote's life before In Cold Blood. He is placed as the phenomenon of culture, celebrity and outrage that he was."

In his review in The New York Times, A. O. Scott called the film "well worth your attention. It is quick-witted, stylish and well acted… warmer and more tender, if also a bit thinner and showier, than Capote… it is in the end more touching than troubling." Rex Reed of The New York Observer opined, "They gave the Oscar to the wrong Truman Capote. I do not begrudge the versatile, popular Philip Seymour Hoffman his Oscar for playing the tiny terror in Capote, but he was doing an impression. In Infamous ... a diminutive actor with a titanic talent named Toby Jones literally becomes the man himself. This is no lisping impersonation learned from watching old Johnny Carson shows: Mr. Jones moves into Truman's skin, heart and brains. Infamous shows you the man's soul. It is a monumental achievement of great artistry and depth. In some ways, the movie is better, too ... [it] is infinitely fascinating, cinematically breathtaking and largely impeccable. It proves that there's more than one way to tell a story and view a life. It is one hell of a beautiful movie to see and savor." Jeff Klemzak penned two articles for the Los Angeles Times on the subject of the two biopics, arguing that Infamous, while covering the same theme as the award-winning Capote, "(a)nd as good as that film was, this one is better".

In Variety, David Rooney wrote the film "doesn't measure up to its predecessor and seems unlikely to echo the attention it received ... In the central role, British thesp Toby Jones is a good physical match for Capote, getting his flamboyant mannerisms and creepy, nasal voice down. But unlike Philip Seymour Hoffman's Oscar-winning turn, there's no texture, no under-the-skin sense of the conflict between Capote's ambition for his book and his compassion for, and attraction to, Perry ... Sandra Bullock's understated performance as Capote's friend Lee is a high point here – wrapped in a cardigan and puffing on cigarettes, she creates a bracingly sturdy character of this plain-speaking, unfussy woman amid a cardboard gallery of flashy sophisticates." Mick LaSalle of the San Francisco Chronicle observed, "By the standards of most pictures, this is intelligent, thoughtful filmmaking ... it's only against the exalted benchmark standard set by Capote that Infamous falls short ... It's a worthy film in its own right, with its own virtues ... Either through studying Lee or channeling someone else, Bullock adopts mannerisms and facial expressions that are not her own for this role and then works them into a well-crafted portrait of a highly internal, observant and deep-revolving spirit. It's the performance to take from the movie."

In The Village Voice, Robert Wilonsky stated the film "never comes close to approaching the quiet, devastating brilliance of Capote ... Which is not to say Infamous ... is a far inferior version ... it's just a lesser version, light in weight and absent the ache ... It's good, especially during its first half, just not good enough." Steve Persall of the St. Petersburg Times rated the film B and added, "Infamous might have been viewed as one of this year's better films if Capote hadn't told the same story about the same characters a year ago and done it so well ... Infamous is inferior, although not drastically so, in almost every respect ... The most obvious comparisons are to be made about performances. Jones is a much more accurate physical representation of Capote than Hoffman, his high-pitched voice sounding a little more affected than his Oscar-winning predecessor. However, the relative shallowness of McGrath's screenplay doesn't offer as many emotional land mines for Jones to play. [He] delivers an uncanny impersonation, while Hoffman's portrayal was a studiously researched impression, a likely more challenging task. Call this race nearly a draw, with Hoffman simply crossing the finish line first."

=== Awards ===
Toby Jones won the London Film Critics' Circle Award for British Actor of the Year. He also won the Best Actor Award at the Ibiza International Film Festival. Daniel Craig was nominated for the Independent Spirit Award for Best Supporting Actor but lost to Alan Arkin in Little Miss Sunshine.

== See also ==
- Capote (film)
- Clutter family murders
- List of American films of 2006

== Bibliography ==
- Plimpton, George (1997). Truman Capote: In which Various Friends, Enemies, Acquaintances, and Detractors Recall His Turbulent Career. Nan A. Talese/Doubleday. ISBN 978-0-385-23249-4 – via Internet Archive.
