= Capote (film) =

2005 American biographical film by Bennett Miller

- Theatrical release poster
- Directed by: Bennett Miller
- Screenplay by: Dan Futterman
- Based on: Capote; 1988 book by Gerald Clarke
- Produced by: Caroline Baron; William Vince; Michael Ohoven
- Starring: Philip Seymour Hoffman; Catherine Keener; Clifton Collins Jr.; Bruce Greenwood; Mark Pellegrino; Amy Ryan; Chris Cooper
- Cinematography: Adam Kimmel
- Edited by: Christopher Tellefsen
- Music by: Mychael Danna
- Production companies: United Artists; A-Line Pictures; Cooper's Town Productions; Infinity Media; Eagle Vision
- Distributed by: Sony Pictures Classics
- Release dates: September 2, 2005 (Telluride); September 30, 2005 (United States); October 28, 2005 (Canada)
- Running time: 114 minutes
- Countries: United States; Canada
- Language: English
- Budget: $7 million
- Box office: $49.9 million

Capote is a 2005 biographical drama film about American novelist Truman Capote directed by Bennett Miller, written by Dan Futterman and starring Philip Seymour Hoffman in the title role. The film primarily follows the events during the writing of Capote's 1965 nonfiction book In Cold Blood. The film was based on Gerald Clarke's 1988 biography Capote. It was released by Sony Pictures Classics on September 30, 2005, coinciding with what would have been Capote's 81st birthday.

The film became a box-office success and received acclaim from critics for Hoffman's lead performance. It won several awards, and was nominated for five Academy Awards including Best Picture, Best Director for Miller, Best Supporting Actress for Catherine Keener, and Best Adapted Screenplay, with Hoffman winning the Academy Award for Best Actor.

== Plot ==
In 1959, the Clutter family murders take place on their Kansas farm. After reading The New York Times, riveted by the story, Truman Capote calls The New Yorker magazine editor William Shawn to tell him that he plans to document the tragedy. Capote travels to Kansas, inviting childhood friend Nelle Harper Lee to come along. With Lee as his go-between and facilitator, he intends to interview those involved with the Clutter family. Alvin Dewey, the Kansas Bureau of Investigation's lead detective on the case, brushes him off. Dewey's wife, Marie, a fan of Capote's writing, persuades her husband to invite Capote and Lee to their house for dinner.

Capote's stories of movie sets and film stars captivate Marie. Over time, her husband warms to Capote and allows him to view the photographs of the victims. The Deweys, Lee, and Capote are having dinner when Dewey is informed that the murder suspects, Perry Smith and Richard "Dick" Hickock, have been caught. Flattery, bribery, and a keen insight into the human condition facilitate Capote's visits to the prison where the accused are held. As he begins to form an attachment to Smith, Capote informs Shawn of his intent to expand the story into a full-length book. Following the trial and conviction, after which both Smith and Hickock are sentenced to death, Capote gains continued access to the murderers by bribing Warden Marshall Krutch.

During the following years, Capote regularly visits Smith while learning about his life, except for a year-long stint, when Capote goes to Morocco and Spain to write the "first three parts" of the book, accompanied by his romantic partner, Jack Dunphy. The story of Smith's life, his remorseful manner, and his emotional sincerity impress Capote, who becomes emotionally attached to him despite the gruesome murders. Capote aids Smith and Hickock by obtaining expert legal counsel for them who initiate an appeal. Nevertheless, Capote is frustrated that Smith declines to relate exactly what happened the night of the murders.

The appeals process―which Capote initially supports to provide proper representation and extend his opportunity to speak with the killers―drags on for several years. Without the court case being resolved, Capote feels he is stuck with a story without an ending, unable to complete his book. Eventually, he convinces Smith to describe the killings and his thoughts at the time in detail. While he has achieved what he wanted from Smith, Capote recognizes his own callousness and selfishness in the process.

With everything now in hand, Capote still must wait for the appeals process to conclude before publishing his work. In the interim, Lee's best-selling novel To Kill a Mockingbird is turned into a movie, but Capote is unable to share in the joy of his friend's success, too caught up in drinking through his misery. With the last appeal rejected, Smith pleads for Capote to return before he is executed, but Capote cannot bring himself to do so. A telegram from Smith to Harper Lee ultimately prods Lee to compel Capote to return to Kansas. There, Capote is an eyewitness as Smith and Hickock are executed. Capote confides the horrifying experience to Lee, lamenting that he could do nothing to stop it. She replies, "Maybe not. The fact is you didn't want to." While returning home, Capote reviews the writings and drawings given to him by Smith, as well as an early childhood photo of Smith and his sister.

An epilogue notes that In Cold Blood made Capote the most famous writer in America; that Capote never finished another book, dying in 1984 from complications due to alcoholism; and that he chose a quote from Saint Teresa of Ávila – "More tears are shed over answered prayers than unanswered ones" – as the epigraph for his unfinished final novel.

== Cast ==
- Philip Seymour Hoffman as Truman Capote
- Catherine Keener as Nelle Harper Lee
- Clifton Collins Jr. as Perry Smith
- Chris Cooper as Alvin Dewey
- Bob Balaban as William Shawn
- Bruce Greenwood as Jack Dunphy
- Amy Ryan as Marie Dewey
- Mark Pellegrino as Richard "Dick" Hickock
- Allie Mickelson as Laura Kinney
- Marshall Bell as Warden Marshall Krutch
- Katherine Shindle as Rose
- Araby Lockhart as Dorothy Sanderson
- Robert Huculak as New York Reporter
- R. D. Reid as Roy Church
- Rob McLaughlin as Harold Nye
- Harry Nelken as Sheriff Walter Sanderson
- C. Ernst Harth as Lowell Lee Andrews
- Jeremy Dangerfield as Jury Foreman

== Reception ==
=== Box office ===
Capote grossed $28.8 million in the United States and Canada and $21.2 million in other territories for a worldwide total of $50 million. DVD/Blu-ray sales totaled $17 million by 2018. The production budget was $7 million.

=== Critical response ===
Capote received acclaim from critics, with Hoffman's performance the subject of particular praise. Review aggregator Rotten Tomatoes reported that 89% of critics gave the film a positive review, with an average rating of 8.50/10 based on 194 reviews. The site's consensus reads: "Philip Seymour Hoffman's riveting central performance guides a well-constructed retelling of the most sensational and significant period in author Truman Capote's life." On Metacritic, the film has a score of 88 out of 100 based on 40 critics, indicating "universal acclaim". Roger Ebert gave the film a four-star rating, stating: "Capote is a film of uncommon strength and insight, about a man whose great achievement requires the surrender of his self-respect."

== Accolades ==
Capote won several awards, including the National Society of Film Critics Award for Best Film, and was named one of the top ten films of the year by both the American Film Institute and the National Board of Review. It was nominated for five Academy Awards and five British Academy Film Awards, including for best film, best director (for Miller), best supporting actress (for Catherine Keener) and best adapted screenplay (for Futterman), with Hoffman winning the award for best actor at both ceremonies. In addition to the Academy Award and British Academy Film Award, Hoffman won the Golden Globe Award and the Actor Award as well as awards from numerous critics groups for his performance. Furthermore, director Miller won the Gotham Independent Film Award for Breakthrough Director and received a nomination at the Directors Guild of America Awards, and Futterman's screenplay was nominated at the Writers Guild of America Awards.

== Historical accuracy ==
To gain access to Smith and Hickock while they were on Death Row, Capote is shown bribing the warden. This incident is based on a quote from Clarke's biography but appears to be incorrect. According to fact checkers, Warden Sherman Crouse initially denied Capote access due to prison regulations which restricted contact with prisoners to immediate family and legal counsel. Capote then retained the firm of Saffels & Hope, who approached the governor of the state and worked out a deal.

No non-fiction sources (including Clarke's) assert that Capote attempted to secure legal representation for Smith and Hickock as is shown in the film. The initial appeal was handled by public defenders and subsequent appeals by the Kansas Legal Aid Society after they were contacted by Hickock. This is mentioned in Capote's book and there is no evidence he ever offered to help find a lawyer.

Capote mainly corresponded with Hickock and Smith through letters, visiting them in person fewer than half a dozen times. Extended stays at the prison are fictionalized, although some confrontations are based on real letters.

== Home media ==
Capote was released on VHS (as a public screener only) and DVD on March 14, 2006. It got American Blu-ray releases on February 17, 2009, October 8, 2012, and January 6, 2015.

== See also ==
- Clutter family murders
- In Cold Blood (1966), Truman Capote's non-fiction novel
- In Cold Blood (1967), a film based on Capote's eponymous book
- Infamous (2006), a film on a similar theme
- Lowell Lee Andrews
