= Richard Hickock =

Executed American mass murderer

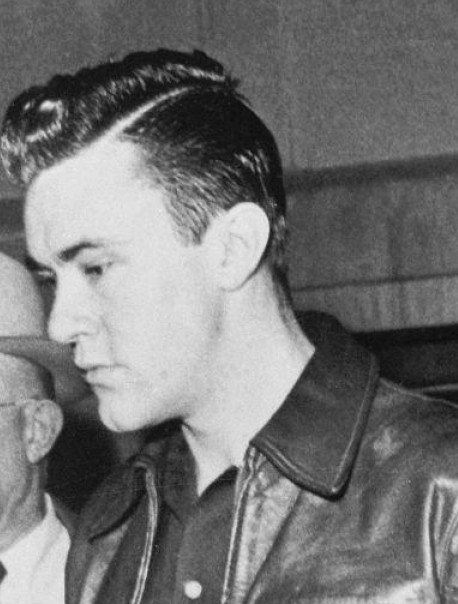
- Hickock in 1960
- Born: Richard Eugene Hickock; June 6, 1931; Kansas City, Kansas, U.S.
- Died: April 14, 1965 (aged 33); Kansas State Penitentiary, Lansing, Kansas, U.S.
- Occupations: Criminal, railroad worker, mechanic
- Children: 3
- Status: Executed by hanging
- Motive: Robbery; Eliminating witnesses
- Conviction: First degree murder (4 counts)
- Penalty: Death

Details
- Date: November 15, 1959
- Country: United States
- Location: Holcomb, Kansas
- Target: Clutter family
- Killed: 4
- Weapons: Shotgun; Knife
- Date apprehended: December 30, 1959

Richard Eugene Hickock (June 6, 1931 – April 14, 1965) was one of two ex-convicts convicted of murdering four members of the Clutter family in Holcomb, Kansas, on November 15, 1959, a crime made famous by Truman Capote in his 1966 non-fiction novel In Cold Blood. Along with Perry Edward Smith, Hickock took part in the burglary and multiple murders at the Clutter family farmhouse.

== Early life ==
Richard Hickock was born on June 6, 1931, in Kansas City, Kansas, to farmworker parents, Walter Sr. and Eunice Hickock. He was one of several siblings, including a younger brother named Walter Jr. According to Walter Jr., their parents provided them with a good upbringing, but they were strict; he said of them, "I'm not sure if they were loving in the way you'd usually say a family is loving." In 1947, the Hickock family relocated to the small east Kansas town of Edgerton. Hickock was a popular student and an athlete at Olathe High School. After finishing high school, Hickock had wanted to attend college, but his family lacked the means to finance his post-secondary education. Hickock went to work as a mechanic instead.

In 1950, Hickock sustained a serious head injury in a car accident that nearly killed him and left him disfigured, rendering his face slightly lopsided and his eyes asymmetrical. According to his younger brother Walter Jr., the accident also changed Hickock's personality. After being released from the hospital, Hickock was left with hospital bills and mounting debts, leading him to start bad financial habits like writing bad checks and gambling. He drifted through several manual labor jobs, working as a railroad worker, a mechanic, and an ambulance driver while simultaneously continuing to write bad checks and commit petty theft. Eventually, the crimes caught up with him, and at the age of 26, in March 1958, Hickock received his first prison sentence. He was imprisoned in the Kansas State Penitentiary for stealing a rifle out of a local home.

When Hickock was 19, he married for the first time. However, he became involved in an extramarital affair, which eventually resulted in the conception of his first child. Hickock then decided to end his first marriage to marry his mistress, and they had two children together. While he served his 1958 prison sentence, his second wife divorced him as well.

While serving his prison sentence, Hickock met fellow inmates Perry Smith and Floyd Wells, the latter of whom used to work for the Clutter family. Wells told Hickock about the affluence of the family's patriarch, Herbert Clutter, specifically telling Hickock that Clutter kept a safe in his house containing $10,000. Hickock and Smith devised a plan to rob and murder the Clutter family. Hickock was paroled in August 1959, after serving seventeen months. Upon release from prison, he got a job at a body shop in Olathe, Kansas, and tried to live an upright life; however, soon afterwards, he contacted Smith. Hickock and Smith met up in Olathe, where they collected supplies to aid in the commission of the crimes. They then went to Holcomb, where the Clutter family resided.

== Clutter family murders ==
Hickock testified after the trial that he and Smith had gotten the idea to rob the Clutters after Hickock was told by Wells, their former cellmate, that there was a safe in the family's house containing $10,000. However, when they invaded the house just after midnight on November 15, 1959, Hickock and Smith discovered that there was no such safe. The pair then murdered all four members of the family. According to Truman Capote's account of the Clutter murders, In Cold Blood, Hickock was prevented by Smith from raping 16-year-old Nancy Clutter during the incident.

Hickock and Smith were arrested in Las Vegas, Nevada, on December 30, 1959, ostensibly for their parole violations. The investigators only later revealed to the suspects that they were arrested for the Clutter murders, after which Hickock confessed to the killings. They both talked extensively to Capote when the author was researching In Cold Blood.

Alvin Dewey, chief investigator in the case, testified at the trial that Hickock insisted in his confession that Smith performed all the killings. Smith, however, first claimed Hickock killed the two women, but later claimed to have shot them himself. Both defendants chose not to testify during their trial, which concluded on March 29, 1960, with both defendants being found guilty on all counts and subsequently sentenced to death.

== Execution ==
Hickock and Smith were executed by hanging at the Kansas State Penitentiary on April 14, 1965. When asked if he had any last words, Hickock declined, but he requested to address the KBI agents who had worked on his case and now were present as witnesses to his execution. Hickock told them he had "no hard feelings" towards them, shook each agent's hand, and simply said, "Goodbye." Smith, in contrast, attempted to speak beyond the room when he addressed the media representatives and declared: "capital punishment is legally and morally wrong." Hickock was executed first and was pronounced dead at 12:41 a.m; Smith followed shortly afterward and was pronounced dead at 1:19 a.m.

== Aftermath ==
Hickock and Smith were both buried in nearby Mount Muncie Cemetery in Lansing, Kansas. Hickock donated his eyes for corneal transplants, and they were used on two patients in Kansas City later that day.

On December 18, 2012, the killers' bodies were exhumed from Mount Muncie Cemetery, as authorities hoped to solve a 53-year-old cold case using DNA. Smith and Hickock had fled to Florida after the Clutter murders, and the two had been questioned about the December 19, 1959, shooting murder of Cliff and Christine Walker and their two young children. A polygraph administered at the time of their arrest in the Clutter case cleared them of the Walker family murders, but by modern polygraph standards, their test results are not considered valid. After the exhumation, officials in Kansas retrieved bone fragments from Smith and Hickock's corpses to compare their DNA to semen found in Christine Walker's pants.

In August 2013, the Sarasota County sheriff's office announced they were unable to find a match between the DNA of either Smith or Hickock with the samples in the Walker family murder. Only partial DNA could be retrieved, possibly due to degradations of the DNA samples over the decades or contamination in storage, making the outcome one of uncertainty (neither proving nor disproving the involvement of Smith and Hickock). Consequently, investigators have stated that Smith and Hickock still remain the most viable suspects.

In 2017, The Wall Street Journal uncovered a handwritten manuscript that Hickock wrote while he waited for his execution on death row. The manuscript, reportedly titled The High Road to Hell, allegedly suggested a motive for the murders, which remains disputed. Before his execution, Hickock had insisted (and Smith concurred) that Smith committed all of the murders. However, Hickock's manuscript describes how he shined a flashlight on each of the four Clutters' heads while Smith fired; Hickock's only regret, according to the manuscript, was that Smith killed all the victims and Hickock committed no murders. In discussing his alleged motive, Hickock claimed that he had committed the killings in a murder-for-hire plot in exchange for $5,000 from a man only named Roberts, writing, "I was going to kill a person. Maybe more than one. Could I do it? Maybe I'll back out. But I can't back out, I've taken the money. I've spent some of it. Besides, I thought, I know too much." Throughout 1961, Hickock sent the manuscript to reporter Mack Nations, who had promised to convert it into a book-length manuscript. After completing the project, Nations sent the converted manuscript to the publishing company Random House, but they returned and advised they had already commissioned Capote to write about the murders.

Writer Kevin Helliker of the Journal speculated that Hickock may have been pathologically lying or engaging in fantasy in his manuscript, arguing that had Hickock's story been true, he and Smith likely would have used the information to try to negotiate their way out of their death sentences by pinning the crime on Roberts, and he and Smith would not have struggled to make ends meet after the crime if they had been paid for it. Michael Stone, a Columbia University psychiatrist who specialized in studying Smith and Hickock, read the manuscript at the request of the Journal and said on the record, "I don't believe for a minute that they got paid to do it."

=== Film portrayals ===
Hickock was portrayed by Scott Wilson in the 1967 film adaptation of In Cold Blood; by Anthony Edwards in the 1996 TV miniseries adaptation; by Mark Pellegrino in the 2005 film Capote; and by Lee Pace in the 2006 film Infamous.

== See also ==
- George York and James Latham
- Capital punishment in Kansas
- List of people executed in Kansas
- List of people executed in the United States, 1965–1972

Preceded by Lowell Lee Andrews – 1962	Executions carried out in Kansas	Succeeded by Perry Edward Smith – 1965
Preceded by Lloyd Anderson – Missouri – 1965	Executions carried out in the United States	Succeeded by Perry Edward Smith – Kansas – 1965
