= Perry Edward Smith =

Executed American mass murderer

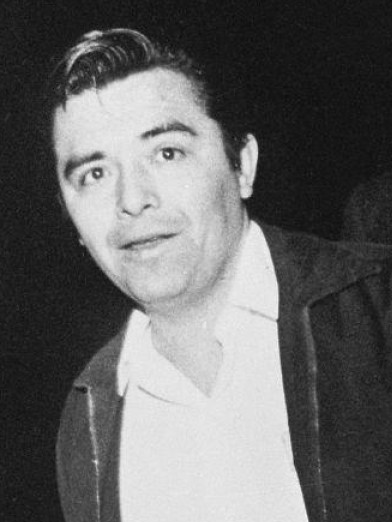
- Smith in 1960
- Born: October 27, 1928; Huntington, Nevada, U.S.
- Died: April 14, 1965 (aged 36); Kansas State Penitentiary, Kansas, U.S.
- Occupations: Criminal, seaman, soldier
- Status: Executed by hanging
- Motive: Robbery; Eliminating witnesses
- Conviction: First degree murder (4 counts)
- Penalty: Death

Details
- Date: November 15, 1959
- Country: United States
- Location: Holcomb, Kansas
- Target: Clutter family
- Killed: 4
- Weapons: Shotgun; Knife
- Date apprehended: December 30, 1959
- Military career
- Allegiance: United States
- Branch: United States Army
- Service years: 1948–1952
- Rank: Private
- Conflicts: Korean War

Perry Edward Smith (October 27, 1928 – April 14, 1965) was one of two career criminals convicted of murdering the four members of the Clutter family in Holcomb, Kansas, on November 15, 1959, a crime that was made famous by Truman Capote in his 1966 non-fiction novel In Cold Blood. Along with Richard Hickock, Smith took part in the burglary and quadruple murder at the Clutter family farmhouse.

== Early life and family ==
Perry Edward Smith was born in Huntington, Nevada, a now-abandoned community in Elko County. His parents, Florence Julia Buckskin and John "Tex" Smith, were rodeo performers. Smith's mother was full-blooded Native American and his father was Caucasian of mixed Irish and Dutch ancestry, but sources differ on the ethnicity of Smith's mother. Truman Capote himself stated that Smith was Irish–Cherokee, saying so in various interviews and in his book. But in his 2019 true crime book And Every Word Is True, Gary McAvoy wrote that Smith's mother was not Cherokee at all, rather she was of mixed Western Shoshone–Northern Paiute ancestry. The family moved to Juneau, Alaska, in 1929, where the elder Smith distilled bootleg whisky for a living. Smith's father abused his wife and four children, and in 1935 his wife left him, taking the children with her to San Francisco, California.

Smith and his siblings were raised initially with their alcoholic mother. After she died from choking on her own vomit when he was 13, he and his siblings were placed in a Catholic orphanage where nuns abused him physically and emotionally for his lifelong problem of chronic bed wetting, a result of malnutrition. He was also placed in a Salvation Army orphanage, where one of the caretakers allegedly tried to drown him. In his adolescence, Smith reunited with his father, Tex, and together they lived an itinerant existence across much of the western United States. Smith also spent time in different juvenile detention homes after joining a street gang and becoming involved in petty crime. In the mid-1960s, Tex moved to Cold Springs, Nevada, where he lived to the age of 92 before dying by suicide in 1986, distraught over poor health. Two of Smith's siblings died by suicide as young adults, and the remaining sister eliminated any contact with him.

== Military service and life in Washington ==
At age 16, Smith joined the United States Merchant Marine. He joined the United States Army in 1948, where he served in the Korean War. During his stint in the Army, Smith spent weeks at a time in the stockade for public carousing and fighting with Korean civilians and other soldiers. In spite of his record, Smith was honorably discharged in 1952 and was last stationed at Fort Lewis, Washington.

Smith stayed with an Army friend for a time in the Tacoma area, where he was employed as a car painter. With one of his first paychecks, Smith bought a motorcycle. While riding, he lost control of the bike due to adverse weather conditions. Smith nearly died in the accident and spent six months in a Bellingham hospital. Because of the severe injuries he sustained, his legs were permanently disabled, and he suffered chronic leg pain for the rest of his life. To help control the pain, Smith consumed an excessive amount of aspirin.

== The murders and life on death row ==
Smith was sentenced to 5–10 years for burglary and unlawful flight to avoid prosecution after robbing the Chandler Sales Barn in Phillipsburg, Kansas, and escaping from jail. Smith was on the run for over a year before being caught in New York City and rejailed. He served his sentence from March 13, 1956, until July 6, 1959, at the Kansas State Penitentiary in Lansing, which is where he first met Richard Hickock. Smith was eventually paroled, and the pair later resumed their acquaintance upon Hickock's release in November 1959. Hickock allegedly wrote to Smith, asking him to violate his parole by returning to Kansas to assist Hickock with a robbery he had been planning. Smith claimed that his return was initially motivated not by meeting with Hickock, but by the chance to reunite with another former inmate, Willie-Jay, with whom he had developed an especially close bond while in prison; Smith soon discovered, however, that he had arrived in the Kansas City area just a few hours after Willie-Jay had left for the East Coast.

Smith met with Hickock, and almost immediately the two set out to work out Hickock's plan. Driving west to Holcomb, they entered the Clutter home through an unlocked door late in the evening of November 14, 1959, where they bound, gagged, and then murdered the four family members present: Herbert Clutter and his wife Bonnie, and their children, Nancy, 16, and Kenyon, 15. Hickock later testified that he had gotten the idea to rob the Clutters after being told by former cellmate Floyd Wells, who had worked as a farmhand for the Clutters, that there was a safe in the family's house containing $10,000. When they invaded the house, however, they discovered that there was no such safe. Smith and Hickock ended up with about $50 in cash, a pair of binoculars, and a Zenith transistor radio that belonged to Kenyon Clutter. After six weeks at large, mostly spent roaming the country, Smith and Hickock were captured in Las Vegas, Nevada, on December 30, 1959, following an extensive manhunt which extended into Mexico.

Smith admitted to cutting the throat of the father, Herbert Clutter, as well as shooting both Herbert and Kenyon Clutter in the head with a shotgun at close range. Records show a dispute as to which of the two shot the women, Bonnie and Nancy Clutter. Alvin Dewey, the chief investigator of the Clutter family murders, testified at trial that Hickock insisted in his confession that Smith performed all four killings; Smith, however, first said that Hickock killed the women, but refused to sign his confession, and later claimed to have shot them himself. Although Smith's revised confession coincided with Hickock's initial statement, both Smith and Hickock refused to testify in court, leading to a lack of an official record detailing who killed the women.

While Smith had only a grade-school education, he maintained a strong interest in art, literature and music. His past regarding his family and abusive childhood led him to be somewhat distant from people. He read extensively, and during his time on death row, wrote poems and painted pictures for other inmates from photos of their family members.

=== Relationship with Truman Capote ===
During research for his novel In Cold Blood, Truman Capote extensively interviewed Smith and eventually befriended him.

=== Execution ===
Smith and Hickock were executed by hanging on April 14, 1965. They requested a last meal of spiced shrimp, french fries, garlic bread, ice cream, and strawberries with whipped cream. Smith was hanged second, dying at 1:19 a.m.

== Exhumation ==
Forty-seven years after the executions, the bodies of the killers were exhumed from Mount Muncie Cemetery in Lansing as authorities hoped to solve a 53-year-old cold case using DNA. Smith and Hickock had originally been questioned about the December 19, 1959, shooting murder in Osprey, Florida, of Cliff and Christine Walker and their two young children. Evidence indicated they had spent time just a few miles from the Walker crime scene after the Clutter murders. A polygraph administered at the time of their arrest cleared them of the murders, but by modern polygraph standards, their test results are not considered valid. On December 19, 2012, officials in Kansas exhumed the bodies of Smith and Hickock and retrieved bone fragments to compare their DNA to semen found in the pants of Christine Walker.

In August 2013, the Sarasota County Sheriff's Office announced they were unable to find a match between the DNA of Smith or Hickock and the samples in the Walker family murder. Only partial DNA could be retrieved, possibly due to degradation of the DNA samples over the decades or contamination in storage, making the outcome uncertain (neither proving nor disproving the involvement of Smith and Hickock). Investigators stated that Smith and Hickock still remain the most viable suspects. However, in 2023, other investigators working on the case expressed doubt about this notion, stating that DNA tests performed by the Kansas Bureau of Investigation excluded Hickock and Smith.

== Film portrayals ==
Smith was portrayed in the 1967 film version of In Cold Blood by Robert Blake, by Eric Roberts in the 1996 TV miniseries adaptation; by Clifton Collins Jr. in 2005's Capote; and by Daniel Craig in 2006's Infamous.

== See also ==
- George York and James Latham
- Capital punishment in Kansas
- List of people executed in Kansas
- List of people executed in the United States, 1965–1972

Preceded by Richard Hickock – 1965	Executions carried out in Kansas	Succeeded by George York and James Latham – 1965
Preceded by Richard Hickock – Kansas – 1965	Executions carried out in the United States	Succeeded by George York and James Latham – Kansas – 1965
