= Joel Black =

American academic

Joel Black is a Professor of Comparative Literature at the University of Georgia in Athens, Georgia. Black has written extensively on subfields of literature and film studies areas such as romanticism, postmodernism, philosophy and history of science, and cultural studies. He is the author of The Aesthetics of Murder: A Study in Romantic Literature and Contemporary Culture (1991) and The Reality Effect: Film Culture and the Graphic Imperative (2002).

== Career ==
=== Education and awards ===
In 1972, Black completed his B.A. at Columbia College of Columbia University, and then one year later he finished his M.A. in English Literature, also at Columbia University. In the 1976-77 school year, Black won a fellowship called the Deutscher Akademischer Austauschdienststipendium, and in 1979, he won a Fellowship at the School of Criticism and Theory at the University of California, Irvine. In 1979, Black completed his Ph.D. in comparative literature at Stanford University.

In the 1982-83 school term, Black won an NEH Fellowship for Independent Study and Research, and in 1989, he won a Fulbright Travel Grant. In 1990, 1992, 1994–96, and 1998, Black won University of Georgia Faculty Research Grants, and in 1997, Black received the William Andrews Clark Memorial Library Fellowship.

=== Research and Teaching ===
In 1978-79, Black was an assistant professor of comparative literature at Hamilton College in New York state. From 1979 to 1982, Black was an assistant professor of comparative literature at the University of North Carolina at Chapel Hill. From 1983 to 1986, he was an assistant professor of comparative literature at the University of Georgia.

In 1986, Black was promoted to associate professor at the University of Georgia. In 1986 and 1989, Black was a UGA Exchange Professor at Universitaire, Instelling Antwerpen, Antwerp, in Belgium. In 1990, Black was a visiting professor at Emory University. In 2003, Black was promoted to professor of comparative literature at the University of Georgia.

== Bibliography ==
=== Books ===
- The Aesthetics of Murder: A Study in Romantic Literature and Contemporary Culture (The Johns Hopkins University Press, 1991)
- The Reality Effect: Film Culture and the Graphic Imperative (Routledge, 2002), iix + 286pp.

=== Chapters, Articles, and Essays ===
- "Scientific Models," in The Cambridge History of Literary Criticism (Volume 5: Romanticism), ed. Marshall Brown (Cambridge: Cambridge University Press, 2000), pp. 115–137.
- "Literature as Secret History," in Literatur im Zeitalter der Globalisierung, eds. Manfred Schmeling, Monika Schmitz-Emans, and Kerst Walstra (Würzburg: Verlag Königshausen & Neumann, 2000), pp. 83–97.
- "The Genealogy of Violence in African-American Literature: Non-Native Sources of Native Son," in The Conscience of Humankind: Literature and Traumatic Experience (Vol. 3 of the Proceedings of the Fifteenth Congress of the International Comparative Literature Association), ed. Elrud Ibsch (Amsterdam and Atlanta: Rodopi, 2000), pp. 325–36.
- "Literature, Film and Virtuality: Technology's Cutting Edge," in Extreme Beauty: Aesthetics, Politics and Death, eds. James E. Swearingen and Joanne Cutting-Gray (London: Continuum, 2002), pp. 78–88.
- "Real(ist) Horror: From Execution Videos to Snuff Films," in Underground USA: Filmmaking Beyond the Hollywood Canon, eds. Xavier Mendik and Steven Jay Schneider (London: Wallflower Press, 2002).
- "(De)feats of Detection: The Spurious Key Text from Poe to Eco," in Detecting Texts: The Metaphysical Detective Story from Poe to Postmodernism, eds. P. Merivale and S. E. Sweeney. (University of Pennsylvania Press, 1999), pp. 75–98.
- "Taking the Sex Out of Sexuality: Foucault's Failed History," in Rethinking Sexuality: Foucault and Classical Antiquity, eds. David Larmour, Paul Allen Miller, and Charles Platter (Princeton University Press, 1998), pp. 42–60.
- "Writing After Murder (and Before Suicide): The Confessions of Werther and Rivière," in Reading After Foucault: Institutions, Disciplines, and Technologies of the Self, 1750-1830, ed. Robert Leventhal (Wayne State University Press, 1994), pp. 233–59.
- "The Hermeneutics of Extinction: Denial and Discovery in Scientific Literature," Comparative Criticism 13: Literature and Science, ed. E. S. Shaffer (Cambridge University Press, 1991), pp. 147–69.
- "Mixed Signals in the Body Languages of Sexual, Commercial, and Extraterrestrial Discourse," in Mimesis, Semiosis, and Power, ed. R. Bogue (John Benjamins, 1991), pp. 157–83.
- "Newtonian Mechanics and the Romantic Rebellion: Introduction," in Beyond the Two Cultures: Essays on Science, Technology, and Literature, ed. Joseph W. Slade and Judith Yaross Lee (Ames, Iowa: Iowa State University Press, 1990), pp. 131–39.
- "Confession, Digression, Gravitation: Thomas De Quincey's German Connection," in Thomas De Quincey: Bicentenary Studies, ed. Robert L. Snyder (University of Oklahoma Press, 1985), pp. 308–37.
- "Paper Empires of the New World: Pynchon, Gaddis, Fuentes," Proceedings of the Tenth Congress of the International Comparative Literature Association (New York: Garland, 1985), vol. 3, pp. 68–75.
- "The Paper Empires and Empirical Fictions of William Gaddis," reprinted in In Recognition of William Gaddis, eds. John Kuehl and Steven Moore (Syracuse University Press, 1984), pp. 162– 73.
- "Idolology: The Model in Artistic Practice and Critical Theory," in Mimesis in Contemporary Theory, Vol. 1: The Literary and Philosophical Debate (John Benjamins, 1984), pp. 172–200.
- "Aesthetics of Gender: Winckelmann, Friedrich Schlegel, and the Hermaphroditic Ideal," ch. 14 in Fragments: Incompletion & Discontinuity, ed. L. Kritzman (New York Literary Forum 8-9, [1981]), pp. 189–209.

=== Articles in Journals ===
- "Freud, Moses, and the Death of Rabin," Mortality 7, no. 1 (2002), pp. 83–95.
- "Psyche's Progress: Soul- and Self-making from Keats to Wilde," Intertexts 5, no.1 (2001), pp. 7–22.
- "Grisham's Demons," College Literature 25.1 (Winter 1998), pp. 35–40.
- "'You Must Remember This': The Intimate and the Obscene in Filmic Narrative," Yearbook of Comparative and General Literature, 40 (1992), pp. 83–89.
- "The Scientific Essay and Encyclopedic Science," Stanford Literature Review, 1:1 (Spring 1984), pp. 119–48.
- "Pynchon's Eve of De-struction," Pynchon Notes 14 (Feb. 1984), pp. 23–38.
- "The Paper Empires and Empirical Fictions of William Gaddis," The Review of Contemporary Fiction, 2 (Summer 1982), pp. 22–31.
- "Levana: Levitation in Jean Paul and Thomas De Quincey," Comparative Literature, 32 (Winter 1980), pp. 42–62.
- "Probing a Post-Romantic Paleontology: Thomas Pynchon's Gravity's Rainbow," Boundary 2, 8:2 (Winter 1980), pp. 229–54.

=== Review Articles ===
- "Murder: The State of the Art," American Literary History 12, no. 4 (winter 2000), pp. 780–93.
- Review of The Changes of Cain by Ricardo J. Quinones, The Comparatist, 17 (May 1993), pp. 141–45.
- "Romanticism and the Sciences," (review of Romanticism and the Sciences, Andrew Cunningham and Nicholas Jardine, eds.), Studies in Romanticism, 31 (Fall 1992), pp. 394–401.
- "Postmodernist Fictions" (review of Postmodernist Fiction by Brian McHale), Pynchon Notes, 18-19 (Spring-Fall 1986), pp. 96–109.
- "The Literature of Play and the Literature of Power" (Literature, Mimesis and Play by M. Spariosu), Poetics Today, 4:4 (1983), pp. 773–82.
- "Allegory Unveiled" (review of Stephen Greenblatt, ed., Allegory and Representation, and Morton W. Bloomfield, ed., Allegory, Myth and Symbol), Poetics Today, 4:1 (Winter 1983), pp. 109–26.
- "Rhetorical Questions and Critical Riddles" (review of Paul de Man, Allegories of Reading), Poetics Today, 1:4 (Summer 1980), pp. 189–201.

=== Reviews ===
- Steven Tötösy de Zepetnek and Milan V. Dimić, eds., Comparative Literature Now: Theories and Practice, in Canadian Review of Comparative Literature 27:1-2 (2002), pp. 307–11.
- Ben Stoltzfus, Lacan and Literature: Purloined Pretexts, in The Comparatist, vol. 22 (May 1998), pp. 194–96. .
- Michael Felske, Zukünftige Vergangenheit: Thomas De Quinceys Suspiria de Profundis als natalteleologische Autobiographie, European Romantic Review 8, no. 2 (Spring 1997), pp. 209–13.
- Sarah Webster Goodwin and Elisabeth Bronfen, eds. Death and Representation, in Victorian Studies, 39:1 (Autumn 1995), pp. 77–79.
- George Levine, ed., Realism and Representation: Essays on the Problem of Realism in Relation to Science, Literature, and Culture, in Philosophy and Literature, 18:1 (April 1994), pp. 187– 89.
- Eduardo González, The Monstered Self: Narratives of Death and Performance in Latin American Fiction, MLN, 107:5 (Dec. 1992), pp. 1064–67).
- Herbert Lindenberger, The History in Literature: On Value, Genre, Institutions, in The Wordsworth Circle 22: 4 (Fall 1991), 228-30.
- John Johnston's Carnival of Repetition: Gaddis's The Recognitions and Postmodern Theory, in MLN, 105:5 (December 1990), pp. 1120–24.
- Virgil Nemoianu, The Taming of Romanticism: European Literature and the Age of Biedermeier, in Philosophy and Literature, 10:1 (April 1986), pp. 133–35.
- Renate Jurzik, Der Stoff des Lachens: Studien über Komik, in Revue Belge de Philologie et d'Histoire, 64:3 (1986), pp. 595–97.
- Frederick Garber, The Autonomy of the Self from Richardson to Huysmans, in Comparative Literature Studies, 20: 4 (Winter 1983), pp. 450–53.
