= Rupperswil murder case =

2015 murders in Switzerland

- Location: Rupperswil, Aargau, Switzerland
- Date: December 21, 2015; 10 years ago
- Deaths: 4
- Perpetrator: Thomas Nick

In the Rupperswil murder case, four people were found dead on 21 December, 2015, after a house fire in Rupperswil, Aargau in Switzerland. The perpetrator, Thomas Nick, was found guilty in March 2018 and sentenced to life imprisonment.

== Events and investigation ==
On 21 December, 2015, firemen were called to a fire in a house in Rupperswil, a village in Aargau (northern Switzerland). The bodies of four people were found in the house, and it soon became clear that they had been killed before the fire broke out.

The victims were 48-year-old Carla Schauer-Freiburghaus, her 13-year-old and 19-year-old sons, and the older son's girlfriend. The assailant entered the family's house by posing as a school psychologist. He tied up the three teenagers and forced Schauer-Freiburghaus to withdraw 10,000 Swiss francs and 1,000 euro at banks, then tied her up also and sexually abused the younger son. He murdered all four by slashing their throats and set fire to the house.

The cantonal police offered a reward of 100,000 francs for information. For five months, the killer remained elusive, but the investigation led in May 2016 to the arrest in a Starbucks in Aarau of a 33-year-old student, Thomas Nick.

His DNA as well as his fingerprints were identified at the crime location, and he gave a comprehensive confession. He coached youth football and had no criminal record. The prosecutors have never disclosed how they caught him but location records of his phone - which cell sites the phone had connected to during the day of the crime - and internet search history played a role in identifying him as a suspect. He did not know the victims and apparently sought them out because of the younger son. When he was apprehended, the police found cable ties, adhesive tape, an old Swiss army ordnance pistol, and rope handcuffs in a rucksack. These were interpreted as a sign that he planned future crimes of a similar nature.

== Trial and sentence ==
Nick was tried in the district court in Lenzburg on charges of murder, extortion, kidnapping, hostage-taking, sexual acts on a child, indecent assault, arson, and pornography. He was found guilty in March 2018 and sentenced to life imprisonment.

The quadruple murder is one of the worst crimes in Swiss history, and Nick has been dubbed "the beast of Rupperswil". There was public discussion of whether Nick should be considered for release after 20 years, as is the norm with indefinite sentences under Swiss law. In December 2018, a court rejected an appeal by prosecutors to have him ruled ineligible for parole.

== See also ==
- Cheshire, Connecticut, home invasion murders, a similar incident in Cheshire, Connecticut, United States in July 2007
