= Non-fiction novel =

Literary genre

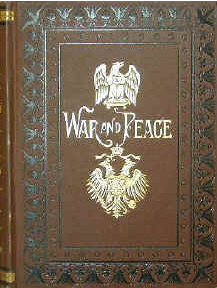
In War and Peace, Tolstoy depicts the Napoleonic wars

The non-fiction novel is a literary genre that, broadly speaking, depicts non-fictional elements, such as real historical figures and actual events, and uses the storytelling techniques of fiction. Sometimes they incorporate fictitious conversations. The non-fiction novel is an otherwise loosely defined and flexible genre. The genre is sometimes referred to using the slang term "faction", a portmanteau of the words fact and fiction. When written about non-fictional elements of the author's own life, the form is known as autofiction.

== History of the genre ==
=== Genre established ===
Les Misérables by Victor Hugo (1862)

The genre goes back at least as far as André Breton's Nadja (1928) and several books by the Czech writer Vítězslav Nezval, such as Ulice Git-le-coeur (1936). One of the early English books in the genre is Rebecca West's Black Lamb and Grey Falcon (1941). Jim Bishop's The Glass Crutch (1945) was advertised as "one of the most unusual best-sellers ever published—a non-fiction novel." Perhaps the most influential non-fiction novel of the 20th century was John Hersey's Hiroshima (1946). Scholar David Schmid writes that "many American writers during the post-World War II period, including Joan Didion, Truman Capote, and Norman Mailer, [chose] to follow Hersey’s lead."

In The New York Times, Herbert Mitgang referred to Paul Goodman's Making Do (1963) as falling into "the category [that] is that growing one which might be called the nonfiction novel." The next year, he applied the term to Leon Uris's Armageddon (1964).

Early influences on the genre can be traced to books such as Ka-tzetnik 135633's (Yehiel Dinur) novellas Salamdra (1946) and House of Dolls (1953), Carlos Bulosan's America Is in the Heart (1946), and John Dos Passos's USA trilogy (1930–36). House of Dolls describes the journey of the young Daniella Parleshnik during the Holocaust, as she becomes part of the "Joy Division," a Nazi system keeping Jewish women as sex slaves in concentration camps. The book's plot was inspired by the Dinur's experience from the Holocaust and his younger sister, who did not survive the Holocaust.

Works of history or biography have often used the narrative devices of fiction to depict real-world events. Scholars have suggested that the novel Operación Masacre (1957) by the Argentine author and journalist Rodolfo Walsh was the first non-fiction novel in Spanish.

=== Walsh's Operación Masacre ("Operation Massacre") ===
Rodolfo Walsh's Operación Masacre (1957) details the José León Suárez massacre, which involved the unlawful capture and shooting of twelve innocent civilians by the Buenos Aires' Chief of Police, during an unrelated military uprising by the Peronist rebel leader Juan José Valle. These events followed a 1955 military coup, self-titled as “Revolución Libertadora” (“The Liberating Revolution”), which deposed the Argentine constitutional president Juan Domingo Perón and installed a dictatorship (whose leader was the hard-line general Pedro Eugenio Aramburu) into power. The book's style makes use of a constant shift between the first and third person narrative, with the protagonists' voices heard throughout the narration, interspersed with facts and details of the events described.

=== Capote's In Cold Blood ===
Truman Capote later adopted the genre. He argued that the non-fiction novel should be devoid of first-person narration and, ideally, free of any mention of the novelist. He was immediately intrigued after reading the story of the Clutter murders in The New York Times, and used the events surrounding the crime as a basis for In Cold Blood (1965). He spent years tracking the story, spent considerable time with the people involved, watched hours of film footage, listened to recordings, and read transcripts and notes. He once claimed that everything within the book would be true, word for word. To gather details, Capote interviewed the murderers, Richard Hickock and Perry Smith. But Ben Yagoda notes that "almost from the start, skeptics challenged the accuracy of In Cold Blood. One early revelation (acknowledged by Capote before his death in 1984) was that the last scene in the book, a graveyard conversation between a detective and the murdered girl’s best friend, was pure invention."

In his review of the book in The American Scholar, Robert Langbaum wrote, "Once we look at structure, we find many nonfiction works as artful and sometimes more artful than many novels. Northrop Frye has, in his influential Anatomy of Criticism, gone so far as to apply the word fiction to any 'work of art in prose.' ... By taking [Capote] at his word and comparing his book to a novel, we can both appreciate his achievement and see its limits. For its best effects are novelistic and it falls short just where it is not novelistic enough."

=== Other 20th-century examples ===
Other examples of the form are:

- Wild Colonial Boys (1948) by Frank Clune, covering Australian bushrangers of the 19th century.
- The Crucible (1953) by Arthur Miller, covering the Salem witch trials of 17th century.
- The Armies of the Night (1968), by Norman Mailer, a narrative which is split into a history and a novel, about the 1967 March on the Pentagon; and The Executioner's Song (1979).
- Roots: The Saga of an American Family (1976) by Alex Haley, which relates the story of the author and his family history for nine generations
- Midnight in the Garden of Good and Evil (1994) by John Berendt
- According to Queeney (2001) by Beryl Bainbridge, which describes the last few years of Samuel Johnson's life as seen through the eyes of Queeney Thrale.
- Dispatches (1977), by Michael Herr which reflects on the journalist's reporting from Vietnam.
- The Day of the Jackal (1971) by Frederick Forsyth describes the attempt by the OAS to assassinate Charles de Gaulle, who they believe is a traitor to France after he declares independence to Algeria. Although the opening depiction of the assassination attempt as planned by Bastien-Thiry is true, the subsequent plot is totally fictional.

Tom Wolfe's The Electric Kool-Aid Acid Test (1968) was an example of the school of New Journalism (often characterized as an invention of the mid-1960s). The novel is hybridized with journalistic narration, which, like Capote's prose, places little emphasis on the process of narration (although Wolfe, unlike Capote, occasionally narrates from first-person).

Hunter S. Thompson's approach of "Gonzo Journalism" (in books like Hell's Angels (1966)) abandoned Capote's narrative style to intermingle personal experiences and observations with more traditional journalism.

=== Reduced usage ===
Since the 1970s, the non-fiction novel has somewhat fallen out of favor. However, forms such as the extended essay, the memoir, and the biography (and autobiography), as well as autofiction, can explore similar territory. Joan Didion, for instance, has never called her own work a "non-fiction novel", while she has been repeatedly credited with writing them; however, she called them "extended" or "long" essays.

=== Late 20th Century works ===
A Tomb for Boris Davidovich (Serbo-Croatian: Grobnica za Borisa Davidoviča / Гробница за Бориса Давидовича) is a collection of seven short stories by Danilo Kiš published in 1976 (and translated into English by Duska Mikic-Mitchell in 1978). The stories are based on historical events and deal with themes of political deception, betrayal, and murder in Eastern Europe during the first half of the 20th century (except for "Dogs and Books", which takes place in 14th century France). Several of the stories are written as fictional biographies wherein the main characters interact with historical figures. The Dalkey Archive Press edition includes an introduction by Joseph Brodsky and an afterword by William T. Vollmann. Harold Bloom includes A Tomb for Boris Davidovich in his list of canonical works of the period he names the Chaotic Age (1900–present) in The Western Canon. The book is featured in Penguin's series "Writers from the Other Europe" from the 1970s, edited by Philip Roth.

Later works classified as non-fiction novels include The Mystery of Beautiful Nell Cropsey: A Nonfiction Novel (1993) by Bland Simpson, which tells the dramatic story of the disappearance of 19-year-old Nell Cropsey from her riverside home in Elizabeth City, North Carolina, in November 1901; In the Time of the Butterflies (1995) by Julia Alvarez, which fictionalizes the lives of the Mirabal sisters who gave their lives fighting a dictatorship in the Dominican Republic, based on their accounts; and A Civil Action (1996) by Jonathan Harr, which describes the drama caused by a real-life water contamination scandal in Massachusetts in the 1980s.

Homer Hickam, author of Rocket Boys (1998) and other well-known memoirs, has described his work as novel-memoirs or "novoirs", wherein he uses novelistic techniques, including fictional conversations, to allow the essential truth of his stories to be revealed.

== See also ==
- Autobiographical novel
- Creative nonfiction
- Docudrama
- Gonzo journalism
- Docufiction
- Educational entertainment
- Historical fiction
- Infotainment
- Legend
- List of genres
- Real person fiction
- Roman à clef
- True crime
