= In Cold Blood =

1966 novel by Truman Capote

In Cold Blood: A True Account of a Multiple Murder and Its Consequences
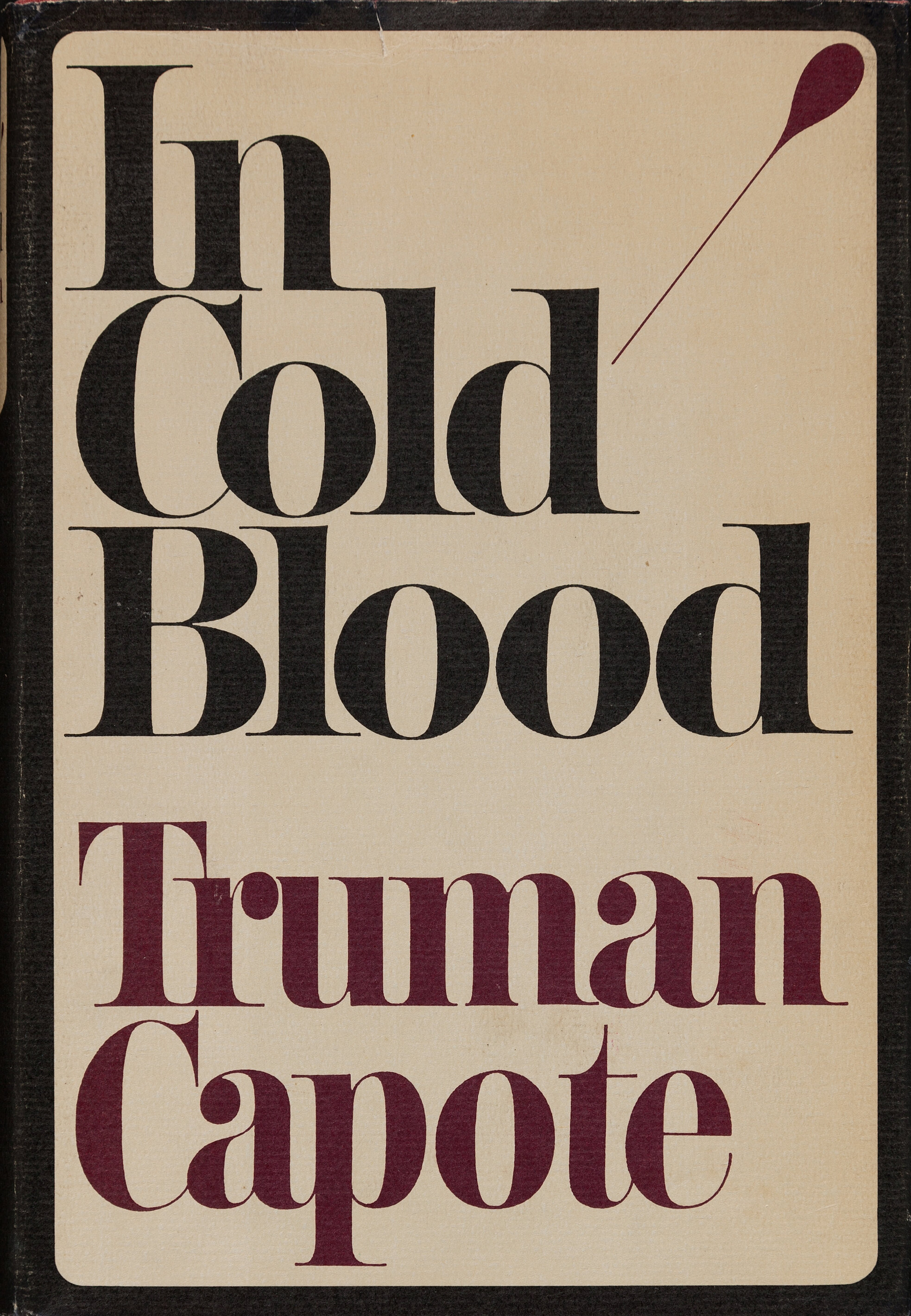
- Author: Truman Capote
- Cover artist: S. Neil Fujita
- Language: English
- Genre: Nonfiction/literature
- Publisher: Random House
- Publication date: January 17, 1966 (see Publication section for more information)
- Publication place: United States
- Media type: Print (hardback and paperback), e-book, audio-CD
- Pages: 343 (paperback edition)
- ISBN: 0-679-74558-0 (paperback edition)
- OCLC: 28710511
- Dewey Decimal: 364.1/523/0978144 20
- LC Class: HV6533.K3 C3 1994

In Cold Blood is a non-fiction novel by the American author Truman Capote, first published in 1966. It details the 1959 Clutter family murders in the small farming community of Holcomb, Kansas, who were murdered by home intruders during a failed home invasion.

Capote learned of the quadruple murder before the killers were captured, and he traveled to Kansas to write about the crime. He was accompanied by his childhood friend and fellow author Harper Lee, and they interviewed residents and investigators assigned to the case and took thousands of pages of notes. The killers, Richard Hickock and Perry Smith, were arrested six weeks after the murders and later executed by the state of Kansas. Capote ultimately spent six years working on the book.

In Cold Blood was an instant critical and commercial success. Considered by many to be the prototypical true crime novel, it is also the second-best-selling book in the genre's history, behind Vincent Bugliosi's Helter Skelter (1974) about the Charles Manson murders. Some critics also consider Capote's work the original non-fiction novel, although other writers had already explored the genre, such as Meyer Levin in Compulsion (1956) or Rodolfo Walsh in Operación Masacre (1957). In Cold Blood has been lauded for its eloquent prose, extensive detail, and triple narrative which describes the lives of the murderers, the victims, and other members of the rural community in alternating sequences. The psychologies and backgrounds of Hickock and Smith are given special attention, as is the pair's complex relationship during and after the murders. In Cold Blood is regarded by critics as a pioneering work in the true-crime genre, although Capote was disappointed that the book failed to win the Pulitzer Prize. Parts of the book differ from the real events, including important details.

== Overview of the Crime ==
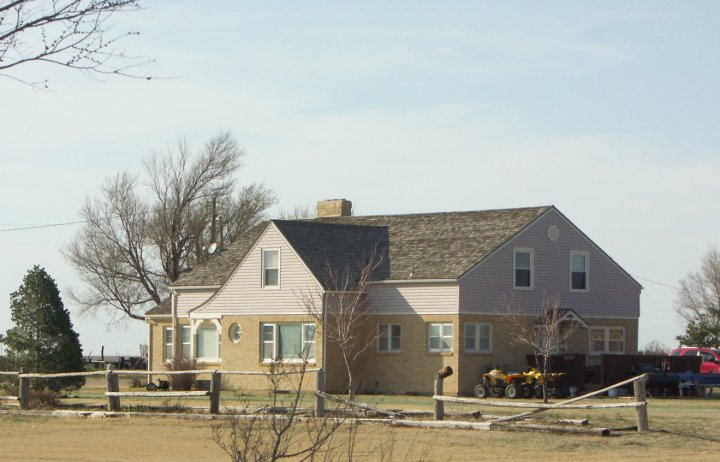
The former Clutter home in 2009

Herbert "Herb" Clutter was a prosperous farmer in western Kansas. He employed as many as 18 farmhands, who admired and respected him for his fair treatment and good wages. His two elder daughters, Eveanna and Beverly, had moved out and started their adult lives; his two younger children, daughter Nancy, 16, and son Kenyon, 15, were in high school. Clutter's wife Bonnie had reportedly been incapacitated by clinical depression and physical ailments since the births of her children, although this was later disputed by her brother and other family members, who maintained that Bonnie's depression was not as debilitating as portrayed in the book.

Two ex-convicts recently paroled from the Kansas State Penitentiary, Richard Eugene "Dick" Hickock and Perry Edward Smith, robbed and murdered Herb, Bonnie, Nancy, and Kenyon in the early morning hours of November 15, 1959. A former cellmate of Hickock's, Floyd Wells, had worked for Herb Clutter and told Hickock that Clutter kept large amounts of cash in a safe. Hickock soon hatched the idea to steal the safe and start a new life in Mexico. According to Capote, Hickock described his plan as "a cinch, the perfect score." Hickock later contacted Smith, another former cellmate, about committing the robbery with him. In fact, Herb Clutter had no safe and transacted essentially all of his business by check.

After driving more than 400 miles (640 km) across the state of Kansas on the evening of November 14, Hickock and Smith arrived in Holcomb, located the Clutter home, and entered through an unlocked door while the family slept. Upon rousing the Clutters and discovering there was no safe, they bound and gagged the family, and continued to search for money, but found little of value in the house. Still determined to leave no witnesses, the pair briefly debated what to do; Smith, notoriously unstable and prone to violent acts in fits of rage, slit Herb Clutter's throat and then shot him in the head. Capote writes that Smith recounted later, "I didn't want to harm the man. I thought he was a very nice gentleman. Soft-spoken. I thought so right up to the moment I cut his throat." Kenyon, Nancy, and then Mrs. Clutter were also murdered, each by a single shotgun blast to the head. Hickock and Smith left the crime scene with a small portable radio, a pair of binoculars, and less than $50 (equivalent to $552 in 2025) in cash.

Smith later claimed in his oral confession that Hickock murdered the two women. When asked to sign his confession, however, Smith refused. According to Capote, he wanted to accept responsibility for all four killings because, he said, he was "sorry for Dick's mother." Smith added, "She's a real sweet person." Hickock always maintained that Smith committed all four killings.

== Investigation and trial ==
On the basis of a tip from Wells, who contacted the prison warden after hearing of the murders, Hickock and Smith were identified as suspects and arrested in Las Vegas on December 30, 1959. Both men eventually confessed after interrogations by detectives of the Kansas Bureau of Investigation.

They were brought back to Kansas, where they were tried together at the Finney County courthouse in Garden City, Kansas, from March 22 to 29, 1960. They both pleaded temporary insanity at the trial, but local general practitioners evaluated the accused and pronounced them sane.

Hickock and Smith are also suspected of involvement in the Walker family murders, which are mentioned in the book, although this connection has not been proven. A defense motion that Smith and Hickock undergo comprehensive psychological testing was denied; instead, three local general practitioners were appointed to examine them to determine whether they were sane at the time of the crime.

After only a short interview the doctors determined the defendants were not insane and were capable of being tried under M'Naghten rules. Defense lawyers sought the opinion of an experienced psychiatrist from the state's local mental hospital, who diagnosed definite signs of mental illness in Smith and felt that previous injuries to Hickock's head could have affected his behavior. This opinion was not admitted in the trial, however, because under Kansas law the psychiatrist could only opine on the defendant's sanity at the time of the crime.

The jury deliberated for only 45 minutes before finding both Hickock and Smith guilty of murder. Their convictions carried a mandatory death sentence at the time. On appeal, Smith and Hickock contested the determinations that they were sane, and asserted that media coverage of the crime and trial had biased the jury, and that they had received inadequate assistance from their attorneys. Aspects of these appeals were submitted three times to the United States Supreme Court, which refused to hear the case.

After five years on death row at the Kansas State Penitentiary, Smith and Hickock were executed by hanging on April 14, 1965. Hickock was executed first and was pronounced dead at 12:41 a.m. after hanging for nearly 20 minutes. Smith followed shortly afterward and was pronounced dead at 1:19 a.m.

== Coverage and public discussion ==
During the first few months of their trial and afterward, Hickock and Smith's murder case went unnoticed by most Americans. It was not until months before their executions that they became "two of the most famous murderers in history." On 18 January 1960, Time magazine published "Kansas: The Killers", a story about the murders. Inspired by that article, Truman Capote wrote, in 1965 serialized in The New Yorker, and in 1966 published, as a "non-fiction novel", In Cold Blood, a true-crime book that detailed the murders and trial. Due to the brutality and severity of the crimes, the trial was covered nationwide, and even received some coverage internationally.

The notoriety of the murders and subsequent trial brought lasting effects to the small Kansas town, and Capote became so famous and related to trials that he was called to help the Senate in an examination of the court case. The trial also brought into the national spotlight a discussion about the death penalty and mental illness. Capote expressed that after completing the book and interviewing Hickock and Smith, he opposed the death penalty.

This trial has also been cited as an example of "the limitations of the M'Naghten rules (also called M'Naghten test)." The M'Naghten rules are used to determine whether or not a criminal was insane at the time of their crime and therefore incapable of being tried fairly. Authors such as Karl Menninger strongly criticized the M'Naghten test, calling it absurd. Many "lawyers, judges, and psychiatrists" have sought to "get around" the M'Naghten rules. In Intention – Law and Society, James Marshall further criticizes the M'Naghten rules, calling into question the psychological principles upon which the rules are based. He stated that "the M'Naghten rules ... are founded on an erroneous hypothesis that behavior is based exclusively on intellectual activity and capacity."

A 1966 article in The New York Times stated that "neighborliness evaporated" in the Holcomb community. "The natural order seemed suspended. Chaos poised to rush in." In 2009, 50 years after the Clutter murders, the Huffington Post asked Kansas citizens about the effects of the trial, and their opinions of the book and subsequent movie and television series about the events. Many respondents said they had begun to lose their trust in others, "doors were locked. Strangers eyed with suspicion." Many still felt greatly affected and believed Capote had in a way taken advantage of their "great tragedy".

== Capote's research ==
Capote became interested in the murders after reading about them in The New York Times. He brought his childhood friend Nelle Harper Lee (who would later win the Pulitzer Prize for Fiction for her novel To Kill a Mockingbird) to help gain the confidence of the locals in Kansas.

Capote did copious research for the book, ultimately compiling 8,000 pages of notes. His research also included letters from Smith's Army buddy, Don Cullivan, who was present during the trial.

After the criminals were found, tried, and convicted, Capote conducted personal interviews with both Smith and Hickock. Smith especially fascinated Capote; in the book he is portrayed as the more sensitive of the two killers. The book was not completed until after Smith and Hickock were executed.

An alternative explanation for Capote's interest holds that The New Yorker presented the Clutter story to him as one of two choices for a story; the other was to follow a Manhattan cleaning woman on her rounds. Capote supposedly chose the Clutter story, believing it would be the easier assignment. Capote later wrote a piece about following a cleaning woman, which he entitled "A Day's Work" and included in his book Music for Chameleons.

Capote's novel was unconventional for its time. New Journalism, as a genre and style of writing, developed during the time in which In Cold Blood was written and Capote became a pioneer in showing how it can be used effectively to create a unique non-fiction story. New Journalism is a style of writing by which the author writes the non-fiction novel or story while it is developing in real life. This is exactly what Capote did as he followed the court trials and interviewed those close to the Clutter family to create this story while it was unfolding in the real world. As a result, he simultaneously researched and wrote the story we now know as In Cold Blood.

== Veracity ==
In Cold Blood brought Capote much praise from the literary community. However, some critics have questioned its veracity, arguing that Capote changed facts to suit the story, added scenes that never took place, and manufactured dialogue. Phillip K. Tompkins noted factual discrepancies in Esquire in 1966 after he traveled to Kansas and talked to some of the people whom Capote had interviewed. Josephine Meier was the wife of Finney County Undersheriff Wendle Meier, and she denied that she heard Smith cry or that she held his hand, as described by Capote. In Cold Blood indicates that Meier and Smith became close, yet she told Tompkins that she spent little time with Smith and did not talk much with him. Tompkins concluded:

Capote has, in short, achieved a work of art. He has told exceedingly well a tale of high terror in his own way. But, despite the brilliance of his self-publicizing efforts, he has made both a tactical and a moral error that will hurt him in the short run. By insisting that "every word" of his book is true he has made himself vulnerable to those readers who are prepared to examine seriously such a sweeping claim.

True-crime writer Jack Olsen also commented on the fabrications:

I recognized it as a work of art, but I know fakery when I see it ... Capote completely fabricated quotes and whole scenes ... The book made something like $6 million in 1960s money, and nobody wanted to discuss anything wrong with a moneymaker like that in the publishing business.

His criticisms were quoted in Esquire, to which Capote replied, "Jack Olsen is just jealous."

That was true, of course ... I was jealous—all that money? I'd been assigned the Clutter case by Harper & Row until we found out that Capote and his cousin [sic] Harper Lee had been already on the case in Dodge City for six months ... That book did two things. It made true crime an interesting, successful, commercial genre, but it also began the process of tearing it down. I blew the whistle in my own weak way. I'd only published a couple of books at that time—but since it was such a superbly written book, nobody wanted to hear about it.

The prosecutor involved in the case, Duane West, claimed that the story lacked veracity because Capote failed to get the true hero right. Richard Rohlader took the photo showing that two culprits were involved, and West suggested that Rohlader was the one deserving the greatest praise. Without that picture, West believed, the crime might not have been solved. West had been a friend of Capote's while he was writing the book, and had been invited by him to New York City to see Hello, Dolly!, where he met Carol Channing after the show. Their relationship soured when Capote's publisher attempted to get West to sign a non-compete agreement to prevent him from writing his own book about the murders.

Alvin Dewey was the lead investigator portrayed in In Cold Blood, and stated that the scene in which he visits the Clutters' graves was Capote's invention. Other Kansas residents whom Capote interviewed later claimed that they or their relatives were mischaracterized or misquoted. Dewey said that the rest of the book was factually accurate, but further evidence indicates that it is not as "immaculately factual" as Capote had always claimed it to be. The book depicts Dewey as being the brilliant investigator who cracks the Clutter murder case, but files recovered from the Kansas Bureau of Investigation show that Floyd Wells came forward of his own volition to name Hickock and Smith as likely suspects; furthermore, Dewey did not immediately act on the information, as the book portrays him doing, because he still believed that the murders were committed by locals who "had a grudge against Herb Clutter".

Ronald Nye, the son of former Kansas Bureau of Investigation Director Harold R. Nye, collaborated with author Gary McAvoy in disclosing parts of his father's personal investigative notebooks which challenged the veracity of In Cold Blood. Their book, And Every Word is True, lays out previously unknown facts of the investigation, and suggests that Herbert Clutter's death may have been a murder-for-hire plot which involved a potential third suspect. However, McAvoy concedes that "neither Hickock nor Smith mention any of this in their confessions, or in their defense at trial".

== Publication ==
In Cold Blood was first published as a four-part serial in The New Yorker, beginning with the September 25, 1965, issue. The piece was an immediate sensation, particularly in Kansas, where the usual number of New Yorker copies sold out immediately. In Cold Blood was first published in book form by Random House on January 17, 1966.

The cover, which was designed by S. Neil Fujita, shows a hatpin with what appeared originally as a red drop of blood at its top end. After Capote first saw the design, he requested that the drop be made a deeper shade of red to represent the passage of time since the incident. A black border was added to the ominous image.

== Reviews and impact ==
Writing for The New York Times, Conrad Knickerbocker praised Capote's talent for detail throughout the novel and declared the book a "masterpiece"; an "agonizing, terrible, possessed, proof that the times, so surfeited with disasters, are still capable of tragedy."

In a controversial review of the novel, published in 1966 for The New Republic, Stanley Kauffmann, criticizing Capote's writing style throughout the novel, states that Capote "demonstrates on almost every page that he is the most outrageously overrated stylist of our time" and later asserts that "the depth in this book is no deeper than its mine-shaft of factual detail; its height is rarely higher than that of good journalism and often falls below it."

Tom Wolfe wrote in his essay "Pornoviolence": "The book is neither a who-done-it nor a will-they-be-caught, since the answers to both questions are known from the outset ... Instead, the book's suspense is based largely on a totally new idea in detective stories: the promise of gory details, and the withholding of them until the end."

In The Independent's Book of a Lifetime series, reviewer Kate Colquhoun asserts that "the book – for which he made a reputed 8000 pages of research notes – is plotted and structured with taut writerly flair. Its characters pulse with recognisable life; its places are palpable. Careful prose binds the reader to his unfolding story. Put simply, the book was conceived of journalism and born of a novelist."

== Adaptations ==
Three film adaptations have been produced based upon the book. The first focuses on the details of the book, whereas the later two explore Capote's fascination with researching the novel. In Cold Blood (1967) was directed by Richard Brooks and stars Robert Blake as Perry Smith and Scott Wilson as Richard Hickock. It features John Forsythe as investigator Alvin Dewey from the Kansas Bureau of Investigation who apprehended the killers. It was nominated for the Academy Awards for Best Director, Best Original Score, Best Cinematography, and Best Adapted Screenplay.

The second and third films focus on Capote's experiences in writing the story and his subsequent fascination with the murders. Capote (2005) stars Philip Seymour Hoffman, who won the Academy Award for Best Actor for his portrayal of Truman Capote, Clifton Collins Jr. as Perry Smith, and Catherine Keener as Harper Lee. The film was critically acclaimed, won at the 78th Academy Awards for Best Actor (Hoffman), and was nominated for Best Picture, Best Supporting Actress (Keener), Best Director (Bennett Miller), and Best Adapted Screenplay (Dan Futterman). A year later, Infamous by Douglas McGrath was released. The film covered the same events as Capote, including Capote and Lee researching and writing In Cold Blood. Toby Jones played Capote, Sandra Bullock played Harper Lee, Daniel Craig played Perry Smith and Sigourney Weaver appeared as Babe Paley.

J. T. Hunter's novel In Colder Blood (2016) discusses Hickock and Smith's possible involvement in the Walker family murders. Oni Press published Ande Parks and Chris Samnee's graphic novel Capote in Kansas (2005). Capote's book was adapted by Benedict Fitzgerald into the two-part television miniseries In Cold Blood (1996), starring Anthony Edwards as Dick Hickock, Eric Roberts as Perry Smith, and Sam Neill as Alvin Dewey.

In 1995 the US composer Mikel Rouse released Failing Kansas, a one-person opera using live vocals and video that retells the story using transcripts and testimony from the original case as well as fragments of verse and songs by Robert W. Service, Thomas Gray and Perry Edward Smith.

== See also ==
- George York and James Latham
- Lowell Lee Andrews
- Capital punishment in Kansas
- New Journalism
- Trial movies
