= In Cold Blood (miniseries) =

1996 television miniseries by Jonathan Kaplan

- Based on: In Cold Blood by Truman Capote
- Written by: Benedict Fitzgerald
- Directed by: Jonathan Kaplan
- Starring: Anthony Edwards; Eric Roberts; Sam Neill
- Composer: Hummie Mann
- Country of origin: United States
- Original language: English
- No. of episodes: 2

Production
- Executive producer: Robert Halmi
- Producer: Tom Rowe
- Production locations: Alberta, Canada
- Cinematography: Peter Woeste
- Editor: Michael D. Ornstein
- Running time: 180 minutes
- Production company: Pacific Motion Pictures

Original release
- Network: CBS
- Release: November 24 – November 26, 1996

In Cold Blood is an American true crime drama television miniseries directed by Jonathan Kaplan and written by Benedict Fitzgerald. It is based on the 1966 novel of the same name by Truman Capote, which reconstructs the 1959 murders of the Clutter family in Holcomb, Kansas. The miniseries stars Anthony Edwards, Eric Roberts, and Sam Neill, with Leo Rossi, Louise Latham, Gwen Verdon, Bethel Leslie, L. Q. Jones, Gillian Barber, and Kevin Tighe in supporting roles. The series aired on CBS from November 24 to November 26, 1996.

In Cold Blood received critical acclaim and two Primetime Emmy Award nominations, including Outstanding Miniseries. Roberts was nominated for a Golden Satellite Award for his portrayal of mass murderer Perry Smith.

== Plot ==
Prisoner Dick Hickock, 28, overhears a cellmate talking about a farmer who keeps $10,000 in cash in a home safe. When Hickock is paroled, he convinces 31-year-old ex-con Perry Smith to rob the safe with him.

One night in November 1959, the two ex-cons break into Herbert Clutter's farmhouse in Holcomb, Kansas, a small town where people often leave their doors unlocked. Angered that no safe is to be found, they murder Clutter, his wife, and their two children. Friends of the Clutters who come by before church on Sunday find the bodies of the Clutters. The murders shock the town and baffle the investigative team led by Detective Alvin Dewey of the Kansas Bureau of Investigation because no clues can be found and no motive can be determined, thus preventing the team from identifying any suspects.

== Cast ==
- Anthony Edwards as Dick Hickock
- Eric Roberts as Perry Smith
- Sam Neill as Alvin Dewey
- Kevin Tighe as Herbert Clutter
- Gillian Barber as Bonnie Clutter
- Margot Finley as Nancy Clutter
- Robbie Bowen as Kenyon Clutter
- Bethel Leslie as Bess Hartmann
- Gwen Verdon as Sadie Truitt
- Leo Rossi as Harold Nye
- Troy Evans as Carl Duntz
- Don S. Davis as Roy Church
- L. Q. Jones as Tex Smith
- Louise Latham as Eunice Hickock
- Campbell Lane as Walter Hickock
- Tom McBeath as Alfred Stoecklein
- Brad Greenquist as Floyd Wells
- Stella Stevens as Hotel Keeper
- Ryan Reynolds as Bobby Rupp
- Lindsey Campbell as Susan Kidwell
- Emily Perkins as Kathy Ewalt
- Susan Hogan as Marie Dewey
- Harry Northup as Minister
- Frank C. Turner as Clarence Ewalt
- Greg Lawson as Insurance Salesman
- Matthew Lerigny as Little Perry
- Stephanie Anne Mills as Dorie
- Mark Herring as Tom Sawyer
- Liese McDonald as Eveanna Clutter
- Brenda Shuttleworth as Beverly Clutter
- Valerie Planche as Mrs. Ketchum
- Veronika Sztopa as Jolene Ketchum
- Renae Morriseau as Flo Smith
- Jesse Lipscombe as Tommy
- Rhys Williams as Bill

== Release ==
The two-part miniseries aired on CBS on November 24 and 26, 1996.

== Awards and nominations ==
Year	Award	Category	Nominee(s)	Result	Ref.
1996	Golden Reel Awards	Best Sound Editing – Dialogue – TV Films, Pilots, Miniseries	David C. Eichhorn and Oliver Barth	Nominated	
1996	Golden Reel Awards	Best Sound Editing – Music – TV Films, Pilots, Miniseries	Chris Ledesma and Bob Beecher	Nominated	
1997	American Cinema Editors Awards	Best Edited Episode from a Television Mini-Series	Michael D. Ornstein (for "Part II")	Nominated	
1997	American Society of Cinematographers Awards	Outstanding Achievement in Cinematography in Mini-Series	Peter Woeste	Nominated	
1997	Artios Awards	Best Mini-Series Casting	Julie Selzer, Patrick Rush, and Lynne Carrow	Won	
1997	Cinema Audio Society Awards	Outstanding Achievement in Sound Mixing for Television – Movie of the Week, Mini-Series or Specials	Larry Sutton, David E. Fluhr, Adam Jenkins, and Don Digirolamo (for "Part II")	Nominated	
1997	Primetime Emmy Awards	Outstanding Miniseries	Tom Rowe and Robert Halmi	Nominated	
1997	Primetime Emmy Awards	Outstanding Single Camera Picture Editing for a Miniseries or a Special	Michael D. Ornstein	Nominated	
1997	Satellite Awards	Best Actor in a Miniseries or a Motion Picture Made for Television	Eric Roberts	Nominated	
