= Capital punishment in Kansas =

Capital punishment is currently a legal penalty in the U.S. state of Kansas, although it has not been used since 1965.

== History ==
From 1853 to 1965, 76 executions were carried out under Kansas' jurisdiction. All but one, the first, were by hanging. These do not include executions that took place at the United States Penitentiary, Leavenworth and United States Disciplinary Barracks; while located within Kansas borders, these hangings were performed under federal government and U.S. military jurisdiction respectively.

Kansas executed nine people between 1863 and 1870. After the 1870 hanging of William Dickson, the legislature decided to place the responsibility of ordering hang execution dates directly with the governor instead of a judge. However, this effectively ended executions in Kansas, as no governor proved willing to authorize executions. The state eventually abolished capital punishment on January 30, 1907. In March 1931, Governor Harry Hines Woodring vetoed legislation to reinstate capital punishment. The state eventually restored it in 1935, albeit no executions took place until 1944. From 1954 to 1960, there were no hangings in Kansas, as Governor George Docking refused to let any execution proceed due to his opposition to capital punishment. The last execution in Kansas took place on June 22, 1965 (double hanging of George York and James Latham).

Perhaps the most infamous Kansas death penalty case was that of Richard Hickock and Perry Smith, sentenced for the 1959 murder of a farming family. The crime, trial and 1965 execution were a subject of Truman Capote's 1966 bestselling documentary novel In Cold Blood.

After the 1976 United States Supreme Court decision in Gregg v. Georgia permitted states to reinstate the death penalty, the Kansas legislature made numerous attempts to do so, but Governor John W. Carlin vetoed such legislation in 1979, 1980, 1981, and 1985. The death penalty was eventually reinstated on April 23, 1994. Of states that still allow the death penalty, Kansas was the last to reinstate the death penalty in the modern era. Lethal Injection is the only legal form of death penalty in Kansas. The law became effective on July 1, after then-Governor Joan Finney, despite her proclaimed opposition to capital punishment, decided to allow the bill to become law without her signature rather than risk having her veto overridden. The only crime punishable by death is first degree murder with the aggravating factors. Despite the reinstatement, no one has been executed since.

== Legal process ==
When the prosecution seeks the death penalty, upon conviction a sentence of death is decided by the jury. Such decision must be unanimous.

In the event of a hung jury during the penalty phase of the trial, a life sentence is issued, even if a single juror opposed death. There is no retrial or rehearing.

The Governor of Kansas has the power of clemency in capital cases, which they may exercise after receiving a non-binding recommendation from a board.

In 2004, the Kansas Supreme Court in a 4 to 3 decision ruled that the state's death penalty statute was unconstitutional. The decision was later reversed by the U.S. Supreme Court in Kansas v. Marsh (2005), effectively reinstating the statute.

== Capital crimes ==
Capital murder is punishable by death if it involves one of the following aggravating factors:

1. The defendant was previously convicted of a felony in which the defendant inflicted great bodily harm, disfigurement, dismemberment or death on another.
2. The defendant knowingly or purposely killed or created a great risk of death to more than one person.
3. The defendant committed the crime for the defendant's self or another for the purpose of receiving money or any other thing of monetary value.
4. The defendant authorized or employed another person to commit the crime.
5. The defendant committed the crime in order to avoid or prevent a lawful arrest or prosecution.
6. The defendant committed the crime in an especially heinous, atrocious or cruel manner, that is:
  - prior stalking of or criminal threats to the victim;
  - preparation or planning, indicating an intention that the killing was meant to be especially heinous, atrocious or cruel;
  - infliction of mental anguish or physical abuse before the victim's death;
  - torture of the victim;
  - continuous acts of violence begun before or continuing after the killing;
  - desecration of the victim's body in a manner indicating a particular depravity of mind, either during or following the killing; or
  - any other conduct the trier of fact expressly finds is especially heinous.
7. The defendant committed the crime while serving a sentence of imprisonment on conviction of a felony.
8. The victim was killed while engaging in, or because of the victim's performance or prospective performance of, the victim's duties as a witness in a criminal proceeding.

== Death sentences and executions ==
Currently, there are 9 people on death row, all males. Lethal injection is the only permitted method of execution.

Generally, death sentences are rarely issued in Kansas, sharply contrasting with neighboring Missouri and Oklahoma.

There is no specific area of any correctional institution in the state designated as a "death row". Most male death row inmates are housed at the El Dorado Correctional Facility along with other inmates in administrative segregation. The state chose El Dorado to house most male condemned prisoners as they wanted different employees to supervise them for the majority of the time from the ones who would be implementing capital punishment. Topeka Correctional Facility is the facility designated for female death row inmates, along with all other female prisoners in the state prison system. The execution chamber is at Lansing Correctional Facility. As of 2023 one male death row inmate is held at Lansing Prison instead of El Dorado Prison because several employees at El Dorado Prison are/were associated with the inmate's murder victim.

== See also ==
- Crime in Kansas
- Kansas v. Carr
- Law of Kansas
- List of death row inmates in the United States § Kansas
- List of people executed in Kansas
