= Murder of the Clutter family =

1959 killings in Kansas, US

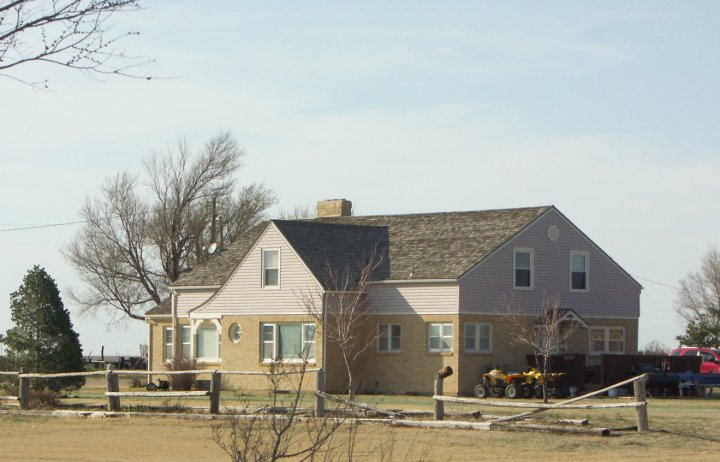
- The Clutter family home, the site of the murders, pictured in 2009

- Location of Holcomb within Finney County and Kansas
- Location: 37°59′6.2″N 100°59′58.6″W; Holcomb, Kansas, US
- Date: November 15, 1959
- Deaths: 4
- Victims: Herbert Clutter (age 48); Bonnie Clutter (age 45); Nancy Clutter (age 16); Kenyon Clutter (age 15)
- Perpetrators: Richard Hickock; Perry Edward Smith
- Motive: Robbery
- Verdict: Guilty
- Convictions: First degree murder (4 counts)

In the early morning of November 15, 1959, four members of the Clutter family – Herb Clutter, his wife, Bonnie, and their teenage children Nancy and Kenyon – were murdered in their rural home just outside the small farming community of Holcomb, Kansas. Two ex-convicts, Perry Smith and Richard Hickock, were found guilty of the murders and sentenced to death. They were both executed on April 14, 1965. The murders were detailed by Truman Capote in his 1966 non-fiction novel In Cold Blood.

== Background ==
Herbert "Herb" Clutter was a prosperous farmer in western Kansas. His oldest daughters, Eveanna and Beverly, had moved out and started their adult lives. His wife Bonnie had reportedly been incapacitated by clinical depression and physical ailments since the births of her children, although this was later disputed. Nancy Clutter, 16, and Kenyon Clutter, 15, attended Holcomb High School.

Richard "Dick" Hickock and Perry Edward Smith were two ex-convicts, recently paroled from the Kansas State Penitentiary. Floyd Wells, a former cellmate of Hickock's, had been a farmhand for Herb Clutter. Wells told Hickock that Clutter kept large amounts of cash in a safe. (In reality, Clutter did not have a safe and transacted all of his business by check.) After speaking with Wells, Hickock hatched the idea to steal the safe and start a new life in Mexico. He contacted Smith, another former cellmate, about committing the robbery with him. According to Truman Capote, the author of In Cold Blood – a non-fiction novel detailing the Clutter family murders – Hickock described his plan as "a cinch, the perfect score".

== Murders ==
On the evening of November 14, 1959, Hickock and Smith drove more than 400 miles (640 km) across the state of Kansas, heading for the Clutter residence to execute their plan. In the early morning of November 15, the pair, armed with a knife and a 12 gauge Savage Model 300 shotgun, arrived in Holcomb, located the Clutter home, and entered through an unlocked door while the family slept. Upon rousing the Clutters, they pushed Bonnie, Nancy, and Kenyon into a bathroom on the second floor of the house, then led Herb to his first-floor office. After their initial search for a safe failed, they retrieved the other three members of the family from the bathroom. Bonnie's hands were tied in front of her; she was gagged, then tucked into bed in a room on the second floor. Nancy's hands were tied behind her—inexplicably, she was not gagged—and tucked into bed. Then the men took Herb and Kenyon to the basement. First they gagged Kenyon, tied his hands behind his back, and tied the rope to an overhead steam pipe in the furnace room. Then they decided to cut him free and move him to the adjoining playroom, bound and gagged; they set him at an oblique angle on the small couch and stuffed a white pillow behind his head, presumably to make him more comfortable. Finally, the killers bound and gagged Herb and pushed him down onto a mattress box on the concrete floor in the furnace room. Smith stayed in the furnace room while Hickock returned upstairs to resume his search for the safe.

A short time later, Hickock returned to the basement, disappointed and angry at finding no safe. The pair had already planned to leave no witnesses, and they briefly debated what to do. Finally, Smith—known to occasionally be unstable, and prone to fits of rage—slit Herb Clutter's throat, then shot him in the head with the shotgun. Moments later, Smith and Hickock reentered the playroom, where Smith shot Kenyon to death. They headed upstairs, then to the second floor, where they entered Nancy's room and shot her to death. Lastly they shot Bonnie Clutter in the side of her head. Each of the four victims had been killed by a single shotgun blast to the head, though Herb's throat was cut as well, and the killers retrieved each spent shell. Recounting later the sequence of the night's events, Smith claimed that he had stopped Hickock from raping Nancy.

Having killed all four members of the family, Hickock and Smith fled the crime scene, taking with them a Zenith portable radio belonging to Kenyon Clutter, a pair of binoculars belonging to Herb Clutter and less than $50 (equivalent to $552 in 2025) in cash presumed to have been left over from a $60 check Herb Clutter had cashed the day before. It was generally known in the area that Herb preferred paying by check, and he seldom carried on his person or kept in the house significant amounts of cash. His billfold and several items were found scattered about in his first-floor bedroom, but no cash was found there.

Smith later claimed in his oral confession that Hickock had murdered Nancy and Bonnie. When asked to sign his confession, however, Smith refused. According to Capote's In Cold Blood, Smith wanted to accept responsibility for all four killings because, he said, he felt "sorry for Dick's mother". Smith added, "She's a real sweet person". Hickock always maintained that Smith had murdered all four victims.

== Victims ==
The four victims:

- Herbert William "Herb" Clutter (May 24, 1911 – November 15, 1959), age 48.
- Bonnie Mae Fox Clutter (January 7, 1914 – November 15, 1959), age 45, Herb's wife.
- Nancy Mae Clutter (January 2, 1943 – November 15, 1959) was the 16-year-old daughter of Herb and Bonnie Clutter. She was the third of the four Clutter children and the youngest daughter. A junior at Holcomb High School, Nancy was a straight "A" student, and she played the clarinet in the high-school band. Well-liked, outgoing, and pretty, she attended church regularly and was active in 4-H. Nancy enjoyed horseback riding, baking, needlepoint, music, and sewing, and she was often sought out by younger girls who wanted her help with domestic skills such as cooking and baking, or with their music lessons.
- Kenyon Neal Clutter (August 28, 1944 – November 15, 1959), age 15, a sophomore in high school, was Bonnie and Herb's youngest child and only son. The quiet, bespectacled youth's interests included hunting, woodworking, and working on an old pickup truck his father had allowed him to buy although he had not yet obtained a driver's license. Like Nancy he was active in the local 4-H club. According to the murderers themselves, Kenyon had been killed by Perry Smith.

Approximately 1,000 mourners attended the Clutter family funeral, packing the First Methodist Church in Garden City, Kansas, county seat of Finney County, seven miles east of Holcomb. A majority of that crowd were also present at the burial at Valley View Cemetery, on the north edge of Garden City. The parents' graves are in the center, marked by a double headstone. Nancy's grave and single headstone is just to the left; that of Kenyon is just to the right.

== Perpetrators ==
The two perpetrators:

- Perry Edward Smith (October 27, 1928 – April 14, 1965), age 31 at the time of the murders; age 36 at execution
- Richard Eugene "Dick" Hickock (June 6, 1931 – April 14, 1965), age 28 at the time of the murders; age 33 at execution

Smith and Hickock were arrested in Las Vegas, Nevada, on December 30, six weeks after the murders, after a dogged investigation by members of the Kansas Bureau of Investigation. After they had been extradited back to Kansas, their trial was held at the Finney County Courthouse in Garden City. Both Smith and Hickock were found guilty of four counts of first-degree murder, and they were sentenced to death.

On April 14, 1965, they both were hanged at the Kansas State Prison near Lansing, just north of Kansas City. Hickock was executed first and was pronounced dead at 12:41 am; Smith followed shortly afterward and was pronounced dead at 1:19 am.

== In Cold Blood ==
Before the killers were captured, author Truman Capote learned of the Clutter family murders and decided to travel to Kansas and write about the crime. He was accompanied by his childhood friend and fellow author, Harper Lee. Together, they interviewed local residents and investigators assigned to the case and took thousands of pages of notes. The killers, Hickock and Smith, were arrested six weeks after the murders and were eventually executed by the state of Kansas in 1965. Capote ultimately spent six years working on his book. When finally published in 1966, In Cold Blood was an instant success. As of 2016, it is the second-best-selling true crime book in publishing history, behind Vincent Bugliosi's 1974 book Helter Skelter, about the Charles Manson murders.

== Film and television ==
- In Cold Blood (1967 film) – Robert Blake portrayed Smith; Scott Wilson portrayed Hickock.
- In Cold Blood (1996 TV miniseries) – Eric Roberts portrayed Smith; Anthony Edwards portrayed Hickock.
- Capote (2005 film) – Clifton Collins Jr. portrayed Smith; Mark Pellegrino portrayed Hickock; Philip Seymour Hoffman portrayed Truman Capote; Catherine Keener portrayed Harper Lee. For his performance, Hoffman won the Academy Award for Best Actor, while Keener was nominated for the Academy Award for Best Supporting Actress.
- Infamous (2006 film) – Daniel Craig portrayed Smith; Lee Pace portrayed Hickock; Toby Jones portrayed Capote; Sandra Bullock portrayed Lee.
- "Once Upon a Crime", Season 5 Episode 1 of A Crime to Remember (2013–2018 documentary series) – The series tells the stories of notorious crimes by switching between dramatization and interviews with crime experts and/or people involved in the crimes.

== See also ==
- Capital punishment in Kansas
- List of people executed in Kansas
