= List of people executed in Wyoming =

The following is a list of people executed by the U.S. state of Wyoming.

Name	Race	Age	Date of execution	County	Method	Crime	Victim(s)	Governor
John Boyer	Mixed (Note: "Halfbreed Indian".)	25	April 21, 1871	Laramie	Hanging	Murder	Mr. Lowry and Mr. McCluskey, white	John Allen Campbell
William Tousant Kensler	Mixed (Note: Halfbreed.)		November 19, 1874	Laramie	Hanging	Murder	Adolph Pinea, white	John Allen Campbell
LeRoy Donovan	White	22	January 18, 1884	Carbon (Note: Change of venue from Sweetwater County.)	Hanging	Murder-Robbery	William Leighton, white	William Hale
George Cook	White		December 12, 1884	Albany	Hanging	Murder	James Blount, white (brother-in-law)	William Hale
John Owens	White		March 5, 1886	Johnson	Hanging	Murder-Robbery	Jacob Schmearer, white	Francis E. Warren
Benjamin Carter	White	38	October 27, 1888	Carbon	Hanging	Murder	James Jeffries, 17, white	Thomas Moonlight
George Black	White		January 26, 1890	Albany	Hanging	Murder	Bob Burnett, white	Francis E. Warren
Charles Miller	White	18	April 22, 1892	Laramie	Hanging	Murder-Robbery	Ross Gishbaugh and Waldo Emerson, white	Amos W. Barber
Frank Howard	White	43	December 7, 1894	Carbon	Hanging	Murder	Charley Horn, white	John Eugene Osborne
James Keffer	White	39	September 25, 1903	Fremont	Hanging	Murder-Robbery	C. J. Warren, elderly, white	Fenimore Chatterton
Thomas Horn	White	41	November 20, 1903	Laramie	Hanging	Murder	Willie Nickell, 14, white	Fenimore Chatterton
Joseph Seng	White	32	May 24, 1912 (Note: First execution at the Wyoming State Penitentiary.)	Uinta	Hanging	Murder	William Lloyd, white (U.P. chief detective)	Joseph M. Carey
J. Warren Jenkins	White	28	November 14, 1913	Laramie	Hanging	Murder	Jessie Root Leffingwell, white (wife)	Joseph M. Carey
Willard Flanders	White	50	June 16, 1916	Sheridan (Note: Change of venue from Crook County.)	Hanging	Murder	His wife and Sam Aultz, white	John B. Kendrick
Wilmer P. Palmer	White	32	August 11, 1916	Natrona	Hanging	Murder	Jessie Sweet Palmer, 28, white (wife)	John B. Kendrick
Oscar W. White	Black	28	October 20, 1916	Natrona	Hanging	Murder	Anderson Coffee, black	John B. Kendrick
Yee Geow	Asian	18	March 11, 1921	Laramie	Hanging	Murder	Thomas Holland, white (immigration investigator) (Note: Also murdered 30-year-old firefighter John S. Federhen.)	Robert D. Carey
George Brownfield	White	54	March 10, 1930	Crook	Hanging	Murder	Theodore Thomas, white	Frank Emerson
Charles Aragon	Native American	25	May 14, 1930	Fremont	Hanging	Murder	Jess (ex-girlfriend's husband) and Ed Large, 65 (Ed), mixed (Note: Halfbreeds.)	Frank Emerson
Talton Taylor	White	33	May 11, 1933	Johnson	Hanging	Murder	William Embrey, white (Note: Also previously murdered Patrick Daly in Natrona County but was acquitted.)	Leslie A. Miller
Perry H. Carroll	White	36	August 13, 1937	Laramie	Gas asphyxiation	Murder	Charles C. Bernard, white	Leslie A. Miller
Stanley S. Lantzer	White	38	April 19, 1940	Laramie	Gas asphyxiation	Murder	Cecile Lantzer, white (wife)	Nels H. Smith
Cleveland Brown Jr.	Black	27	November 17, 1944	Lincoln	Gas asphyxiation	Murder-Rape	Elizabeth Kusnirik, 79, white	Lester C. Hunt
Andrew Pixley	Hispanic	22	December 10, 1965	Washakie (Note: Change of venue from Teton County.)	Gas asphyxiation	Murder-Rape	Debbie and Cindy McAuliffe, 12 and 8, white	Clifford Hansen
Mark Hopkinson	White	42	January 22, 1992	Uinta	Lethal injection	Murder	Jeffrey Green, white (Note: Proxy serial killer, also responsible for the murders of Vincent, Beverly, and John Vehar.)	Mike Sullivan

One federal execution has taken place in Wyoming:

Name	Race	Age	Date of execution	Location	Method	Crime	Victim(s)	President
Henry Ruhl	White	36	April 27, 1945	Wyoming State Penitentiary	Gas asphyxiation	Murder on a Government Reservation	Matt Katmo, 44, white	Harry S. Truman

== See also ==
- Capital punishment in Wyoming
- Capital punishment in the United States
