= Andrew Pixley =

American murderer

- Born: Andrew Armandoz Benavidez; January 29, 1943; Las Cruces, New Mexico, U.S.
- Died: December 10, 1965 (aged 22); Wyoming State Penitentiary, Wyoming, U.S.
- Status: Executed by gas chamber
- Conviction: First degree murder
- Penalty: Death (February 3, 1965)

Details
- Victims: 2
- Date: August 7, 1964
- Country: United States
- State: Wyoming

Andrew Pixley (January 29, 1943 – December 10, 1965) was a convicted murderer from Dallas, Oregon. He was executed December 10, 1965, in Wyoming for the murder of two young girls in August 1964. He was the last person executed in Wyoming until 1992, and the first of only two after World War II. He was also the 4th to last offender executed before Furman vs. Georgia and the offender whose crime had occurred at the latest date.

== Early life ==
Born Andrew Armandoz Benavidez in Las Cruces, New Mexico, Pixley joined the U.S. Army after being charged with passing bad checks. His father Columbus Pixley said he had dropped out of high school and had never held a job. He served two years, mostly overseas. He was described as "slightly built" and "nervous" and as a transient and dishwasher. There was a previous warrant out for his arrest in his home town on a charge of larceny. He was accused and cleared of being in possession of a stolen car in Davenport, Washington, two weeks before the murders. He had been living in a trailer with two employees of the hotel where the murders took place, David Starling and Orval Edwards. Starling was described as having had prior knowledge of Pixley's violent tendencies.

== Murders ==
On the night of August 7, 1964, Pixley broke into a room of the Wort Motor Hotel in Jackson, Wyoming, occupied by the family of Illinois Circuit Court Judge Robert McAuliffe, who were on vacation. McAuliffe and his wife were elsewhere in the hotel taking in a show. When they returned to their room, they found Pixley lying on the floor. He appeared to be drunk, but may have been feigning; McAuliffe said at the trial he had not smelled alcohol. McAuliffe grabbed Pixley and pinned him to the floor. Police officer James Jensen heard Mrs. McAuliffe screaming and rushed to the scene, where McAuliffe shouted "My God, this man has killed my babies."

Their older daughters, Debbie, 12, and Cindy, 8, lay dead in their beds. Both girls had been sexually assaulted. Debbie had been bludgeoned with a rock and Cindy had been beaten and strangled.

The youngest child, six-year-old Susan, was unharmed. Initially described as asleep during the crime, she may actually have witnessed the assault on her sisters.

Pixley had apparently climbed a stack of wood and scaled the rear wall of the hotel, removing a screen to get in at the window.

As Pixley was taken by police from the hotel, a crowd outside called for him to be lynched. He was taken to a jail in another town and then to the Wyoming State Penitentiary for better security.

The McAuliffe sisters were buried together in a single casket. Their parents later filed suit against the hotel in order to pay for the surviving child's psychiatric treatment.

Initially, Pixley only told police "I didn't do it." Hotel employee Richard Southern testified that Pixley cited his Native American heritage in explaining why he "couldn't" have done such a thing. Later, Pixley asked to make a statement, and was examined using sodium pentothal interviews. He said he remembered drinking earlier in the evening, but could not remember entering the hotel or killing the girls. His court-appointed attorney, Robert Hufsmith, added that Pixley remembered being in the company of another person earlier that evening, but that his mind was "blank since he left that person." Pixley later admitted to the murders, but pleaded not guilty by reason of insanity.

Pixley was examined by Dr. William Karn Jr. of the Wyoming State Hospital, who pronounced him sane, but an "incurable sociopath" at the trial, adding that "it meant a lot more to Pixley to kill the girls while they were awake." At this, Robert McAuliffe got up from his seat and attempted to assault Pixley before being restrained.

The psychiatrist went on to describe Pixley as "one of the sickest we've ever seen sociopathically", and that the odds of him being rehabilitated were "absolutely nil".

Pixley pleaded guilty to first degree murder in the perpetration of a rape for killing Debbie and was sentenced to death. He started laughing when the execution date was announced. Enraged, Robert McAuliffe told him: "laugh some more, you animal." Although an appeal was filed to change his sentence to life imprisonment, he said he did not want an appeal. He was executed by lethal gas at the Wyoming State Penitentiary on December 10, 1965. He took the longest time to die of any person ever executed in the Wyoming gas chamber. Until the execution of Mark Hopkinson in 1992, Pixley was the last person to be put to death in Wyoming.

Pixley privately expressed signs of remorse, telling his stepfather that he deserved to be executed.

According to genealogical research, Robert and Betty McAuliffe divorced sometime after the murders. McAuliffe remarried Charlotte Olivia Moon Branch and had a son, Jon David McAuliffe, born on January 21, 1974, in Chicago. Robert died on April 1, 1998, of a heart attack. Betty McAuliffe died on November 28, 2010. Susan McAuliffe married and had five children.

== See also ==
- Capital punishment in Wyoming
- List of people executed in Wyoming
- List of people executed in the United States, 1965–1972
- Volunteer (capital punishment)

Executions carried out in Wyoming
Preceded by Cleveland Brown Jr. November 17, 1944	Andrew Pixley; December 10, 1965	Succeeded by Mark Hopkinson January 22, 1992
Executions carried out in the United States
Preceded by George York and James Latham – Kansas June 22, 1965	Andrew Pixley – Wyoming; December 10, 1965	Succeeded by James French – Oklahoma August 10, 1966
