= George York and James Latham =

American spree killers

- York and Latham in Utah after their arrest in Utah on June 10, 1961
- Born: George Ronald York; February 6, 1943; Jacksonville, Florida, U.S. James Douglas Latham; April 21, 1942; Mauriceville, Texas, U.S.
- Died: George York; June 22, 1965 (aged 22); Kansas State Penitentiary, Lansing, Kansas, U.S. James Latham; June 22, 1965 (aged 23); Kansas State Penitentiary, Lansing, Kansas, U.S.
- Cause of death: Execution by hanging
- Conviction: First degree murder
- Penalty: Death

Details
- Span of crimes: May 26 – June 10, 1961
- Country: United States
- States: Florida, Tennessee, Illinois, Kansas, and Colorado
- Killed: 7
- Injured: 1
- Weapons: Stockings.38 Colt revolver.22 EIG Derringer
- Date apprehended: June 10, 1961

George Ronald York (February 6, 1943 – June 22, 1965) and James Douglas Latham (April 21, 1942 – June 22, 1965) were an American spree killer duo who are the most recent people to be legally executed by the U.S. state of Kansas.

== Killing spree ==
In late 1959, York and Latham met at Fort Hood, Texas, where both were privates in the United States Army. Latham had come to Fort Hood from Fort Carson, Colorado, where he had undergone basic training between May and July 1959. In May 1961 York and Latham (aged 18 and 19 at the time, respectively), who did not want to share their barracks with black soldiers, went AWOL, escaped from an Army stockade in Fort Hood, Texas, where the two were each serving six-month sentences, York for going AWOL and Latham for theft, and decided to travel to York's hometown of Jacksonville, Florida.

On May 26, they encountered Edward J. Guidroz in Mix, Louisiana. York and Latham badly beat him and stole his truck. On May 29, they met Althea Ottavio and Patricia Hewett, visitors from Georgia, in Jacksonville, where they had spent the day, shopping. According to the Federal Bureau of Investigation, York and Latham strangled both women with their own stockings, stole their money, and dumped the car they had been driving in a ditch.

On June 6, York and Latham attempted to rob a man in a Cadillac near Aiken, South Carolina, but the shots they fired at him missed, and their would-be victim escaped. On June 7, York and Latham murdered 71-year-old John Whitaker in Tullahoma, Tennessee. They took Whitaker's car and abandoned the first truck they had stolen.

On June 8, York and Latham abandoned Whittaker's car near Troy, Illinois, and hitched a ride from a passerby named Albert Reed. They murdered Reed, dumped his body in a creek, and commandeered his car.

Several miles outside of Edwardsville, Illinois, York and Latham killed gas station owner Martin Drenovac, and stole gas and money from the station. They continued their cross-country killing spree in Wallace, Kansas where on June 9, they shot 61-year-old Otto Zeigler to death, then took his wallet. On June 10 in Craig, Colorado, they killed 17-year-old motel maid Rachel Moyer, dumping her body and her few belongings in a ravine.

== Arrest and confession ==
Later on June 10, 1961, York and Latham were arrested in Tooele County, Utah, for violating the federal National Motor Vehicle Theft Act, which prohibited transportation of a stolen vehicle across state lines within the United States. On June 11, York and Latham bragged to investigators that they had killed eight or nine people since they left Fort Hood. Police later learned that nine people were attacked by York and Latham, but two of them had survived. York and Latham claimed that being placed in a mixed-race unit in the army led to their desire to desert.

Execution loomed over the pair in a number of different states; had they been tried by Florida, Illinois or Tennessee, they would have most likely been electrocuted. Had they been tried by Colorado, they would have most likely been gassed. Ultimately, they were tried by Kansas, where hanging was the prescribed method of execution.

== Trial and imprisonment ==
York and Latham were tried in Kansas for the killing of Ziegler. They were convicted by a jury and sentenced to death by Judge Benedict P. Cruise on November 8, 1961. While on death row in Kansas, York and Latham associated with Richard Hickock and Perry Smith, the subjects of Truman Capote's book In Cold Blood. York and Latham's crimes are described in Capote's book, and the men are portrayed in the work as flippant, snide, and lacking any degree of remorse.

== Executions ==
York and Latham were executed by hanging at Kansas State Penitentiary (now known as Lansing Correctional Facility) on June 22, 1965. Latham was executed first, followed by York. Latham's last words were "I'm not mad at anybody." York's last words were "There is nothing to say but that I'm going to heaven."

Since their execution, no one has been put to death by the state of Kansas, although a number of prisoners have been sentenced to death. York and Latham were also the last persons executed by hanging in the United States until 1993, when the state of Washington hanged Westley Allan Dodd.

== Victims ==
- May 26: Edward J. Guidroz (survived)
- May 29: Althea Ottavio, 42, and Patricia Hewett, 24
- June 6: Unnamed man (survived)
- June 7: John Whitaker, 71
- June 8: Albert Reed, 35, and Martin Drenovac, 69
- June 9: Otto Zeigler, 61
- June 10: Rachel Moyer, 17

== See also ==
- Capital punishment in Kansas
- List of most recent executions by jurisdiction
- List of people executed in Kansas
- List of people executed in the United States, 1965–1972

== Bibliography ==
- "2 Soldiers tell of murdering 7". The New York Times. June 12, 1961. p. 19.
- Capote, Truman Capote (1966). In Cold Blood. New York: Vintage Books.
- Capote, Truman (October 16, 1965). "In Cold Blood: The Corner (Part IV)". New Yorker. p. 62.
- "Murder trail left by youths, police claim". The Age. June 13, 1961. p. 8.
- "Two Hanged in Kansas After Slaying 7 Persons". The New York Times. June 23, 1965. p. 21.

Preceded by Perry Edward Smith – 1965	Executions carried out in Kansas	Succeeded by None
Preceded by Perry Edward Smith – Kansas – 1965	Executions carried out in the United States	Succeeded by Andrew Pixley – Wyoming – 1965
