= Albany County Sheriff =

Albany County Sheriff may refer to:

- Albany County Sheriff's Department in Albany County, New York
- Albany County Sheriff's Office in Albany County, Wyoming
