= Wyoming Medium Correctional Institution =

Prison for men in Torrington, Wyoming

Coordinates: 42°04′17″N 104°07′06″W

- Interactive map of Wyoming Medium Correctional Institution
- Location: 7076 Rd 55F Torrington, Wyoming
- Status: open
- Security class: medium / mixed
- Capacity: 720
- Opened: 2010
- Managed by: Wyoming Department of Corrections
- Director: Seth Norris, Warden

Wyoming Medium Correctional Institution (WMCI) is a prison for men located in Torrington, Wyoming, United States. WMCI, a facility of the Wyoming Department of Corrections, serves as an intake center for men who are not sentenced to death.

== History ==
The Layton Construction Company built the WMCI facility, while DLR Group designed the institution. As the prison was being prepared to house inmates, the state moved 20 prisoners from the Wyoming Honor Conservation Camp in Newcastle; the prisoners assisted preparations during the week and lived in the honor conservation camp over the weekends.

The grand opening and ribbon cutting occurred on January 6, 2010. The prison's first 75 offenders arrived at WMCI from the Wyoming State Penitentiary on January 13. Days later more prisoners arrived, bringing the total number to over 300. The first of those inmates arrived from the Wyoming State Penitentiary on January 17. On January 20, 127 prisoners sentenced in Wyoming who were previously housed in correctional facilities in Virginia arrived at WMCI. Several days later, more Wyoming-sentenced prisoners who were previously housed in Virginia arrived at WMCI.

== Notable inmates ==
- Robert Joseph Silveria Jr.
- Russell Henderson - murderer of Matthew Shepard

== Events ==
In October 2021, WMCI experienced the largest surge in COVID-19 cases among prisoners and staff in Wyoming during the coronavirus pandemic. Between October 11 and 18, 212 out of around 600 prisoners tested positive for the virus. A group of prisoners who had not tested positive were moved into the facility's gym, and took over all cooking and cleaning duties for two weeks. Three prisoners died in hospitals that month, but their deaths have not been attributed to COVID-19.
