= Wyoming Department of Corrections =

U.S. state government agency

State agency overview
- Formed: 1991
- Preceding agencies: Wyoming State Board of Charities and Reform; Wyoming Department of Probation and Parole (adult parole functions)
- Type: Corrections
- Jurisdiction: Wyoming
- Status: Active
- Headquarters: Suite 100, 1934 Wyott Drive, Cheyenne, Wyoming; 41°07′46″N 104°48′09″W
- Child agencies: Wyoming State Penitentiary; Wyoming Women's Center; Wyoming Honor Farm; Wyoming Honor Conservation Camp & Boot Camp; Wyoming Medium Correctional Institution

Wyoming Department of Corrections patch

The Wyoming Department of Corrections (WDOC) is a state agency of Wyoming that operates adult correctional facilities. It is headquartered in Suite 100 of the 1934 Wyott Drive building in Cheyenne.

== History ==
Wyoming entered the Union in 1890. As a territory, inmates were held at the Wyoming Territorial Prison at Laramie. Work began for a state prison at Rawlins in 1888, but the facility did not open until 1901. The building had 104 cells and housed both male and female inmates. In 1909, female inmates were transported to Colorado to serve their sentences. In 1950 an additional wing was added that featured running water and solitary confinement cells. This jail was in use until 1980. when the present state penitentiary was built.

In 1912, a riot resulted in the escape of twenty-seven inmates and the death of one local man.

A gas chamber was added in 1936. Five men were killed there. The original cell block gained running water in 1978.

In November 1990 Wyoming voters approved a constitutional amendment that abolished the Wyoming State Board of Charities and Reform. The institutions of the former state agency were divided and given to other agencies; the Department of Corrections, created in 1991, took responsibility of the adult correctional facilities and also absorbed the adult parole functions of the Wyoming Department of Probation and Parole.

The system is overcrowded. Starting in 2019, it has leased prison beds from a private facility in Mississippi. Female prisoners are housed in county jails or one of the state's male prisons because of lack of capacity. Average staff turnover in recent years has been about 23%. The state has cut 180 staff positions from the system since 2011.

== Facilities ==
Institutions include:

- Wyoming State Penitentiary (Rawlins)
- Wyoming Women's Center (Lusk; inmate capacity 261)
- Wyoming Honor Farm (Riverton; inmate capacity 283)
- Wyoming Honor Conservation Camp & Boot Camp (Newcastle; combined inmate capacity 261)
- Wyoming Medium Correctional Institution (Torrington)
  - The grand opening and ribbon cutting occurred on January 6, 2010. It serves as an intake center for men who are not sentenced to death.

== Fallen officers ==
Since the establishment of the Wyoming Department of Corrections, three officers have died in the line of duty.

== See also ==
- List of law enforcement agencies in Wyoming
- List of United States state correction agencies
- List of U.S. state prisons
- Prison
