= Wyoming Game and Fish Department =

State government agency

Agency overview
- Formed: 1973; 53 years ago
- Preceding agency: *Office of State Game Warden (1899) *Wyoming Game and Fish Commission (1921-)
- Jurisdiction: State of Wyoming
- Headquarters: 5400 Bishop Blvd. Cheyenne, WY 82006; 41.168445°N 104.842154°W
- Agency executive: Angi Bruce, Director
- Website: wgfd.wyo.gov

Map
- Wyoming Game and Fish Department Jurisdiction within the State of Wyoming in the United States, highlighted in red.

The Wyoming Game and Fish Department is the State of Wyoming's state agency charged with stewardship of the state's fish, game, and wildlife resources. The department sets fish and game regulations, including issuance of hunting and fishing licenses and enforcement of state regulations throughout the state. The department also enforces watercraft regulations and registration, along with enforcement of invasive species laws. The agency is headquartered in Cheyenne.

== History ==
The Wyoming Game and Fish Department back then was called The Office of State Game Warden (1899) then, Wyoming Game and Fish Commission and now the Wyoming Game and Fish Department (1973-2023 present)

The Wyoming Game and Fish Commission created the Hunter Management Areas (HMAs), Walk-In Hunting Area (WIHA), shortened to Walk-in Areas (WIA), and the Walk-in Fishing areas (WIF), in 1998, as part of the pilot Private Lands Public Wildlife (PLPW) Access Initiative. WIAs began with 27,000 acres (11,000 ha). By 2015 the total hunting acreage was 1,102,709 acres (446,250 ha) By 2025, the total hunting acres of the Department’s Access Yes program increased to 2,547,138 acres (1,030,790 ha).

== See also ==
- Game warden
- List of law enforcement agencies in Wyoming
- Wyoming Division of State Parks and Historic Sites
- List of state and territorial fish and wildlife management agencies in the United States
