= List of people executed in the United States in 1952 =

Eighty-one people, all male, were executed in the United States in 1952, sixty-six by electrocution, thirteen by gas chamber, and two by hanging.

== List of people executed in the United States in 1952 ==
No.	Date of execution	Name	Age of person			Gender	Ethnicity	State	Method	Ref.
No.	Date of execution	Name	At execution	At offense	Age difference	Gender	Ethnicity	State	Method	Ref.
1	January 5, 1952	James Bernard Lammers	27	26	1	Male	White	Kansas	Hanging	
2	January 8, 1952	Richard Sterling McMurrin	21	19	2	Male	Black	Texas	Electrocution	
3	January 18, 1952	James Isaac Robinson	33	30	3	Male	White	Kentucky	Electrocution	
4	January 18, 1952	Lon Stevenson	19	18	1	Male	Black	Ohio	Electrocution	
5	January 25, 1952	Raymond Jenko	20	19	1	Male	White	Illinois	Electrocution	
6	January 25, 1952	Smith Harvey	41	40	1	Male	Black	South Carolina	Electrocution	
7	February 1, 1952	Earl David Birchem	49	46	3	Male	White	Kentucky	Electrocution	
8	February 15, 1952	Frederick Swanson Pritchett	40	37	3	Male	White	District of Columbia	Electrocution	
9	February 15, 1952	Frank James Cox	41	40	1	Male	White	South Carolina	Electrocution	
10	February 21, 1952	Henry Johnson Brock	38	35	3	Male	White	Georgia	Electrocution	
11	February 25, 1952	Edward J. Bryant	28	25	3	Male	Black	Pennsylvania	Electrocution	
12	February 25, 1952	Joseph Daniel Chambers	28	25	3	Male	Black	Pennsylvania	Electrocution	
13	February 29, 1952	William Jerome Phyle	35	29	6	Male	White	California	Gas chamber	
14	February 29, 1952	George Tiller	43	41	2	Male	Black	Ohio	Electrocution	
15	March 1, 1952	Homer Almond	48	Unknown	Unknown	Male	Black	Georgia	Electrocution	
16	March 6, 1952	Bernard Stein	35	29	6	Male	White	New York	Electrocution	
17	March 7, 1952	Doil Miller	31	28	3	Male	Black	California	Gas chamber	
18	March 12, 1952	Robert Lee Johnson	34	33	1	Male	White	Texas	Electrocution	
19	March 14, 1952	Clifton Williams	30	29	1	Male	Black	Georgia	Electrocution	
20	March 14, 1952	Harry Williams	21	20	1	Male	Black	Illinois	Electrocution	
21	March 21, 1952	William Thomas Coefield	24	21	3	Male	White	California	Gas chamber	
22	April 4, 1952	Pat Reece	33	31	2	Male	White	Georgia	Electrocution	
23	April 4, 1952	Jessie Lee Quarles	27	25	2	Male	Black	Kentucky	Electrocution	
24	April 4, 1952	Charlie Holmes	38	35	3	Male	Black	Mississippi	Electrocution	
25	April 7, 1952	Coy McCann	48	46	2	Male	Black	Florida	Electrocution	
26	April 9, 1952	Marvin Eugene Johnson	21	20	1	Male	White	Texas	Electrocution	
27	April 17, 1952	Eli Griffin	42	41	1	Male	Black	Georgia	Electrocution	
28	April 18, 1952	William Perry Blasingame Jr.	32	31	1	Male	White	South Carolina	Electrocution	
29	April 18, 1952	J.P. Priester	20	19	1	Male	Black	South Carolina	Electrocution	
30	April 18, 1952	John Priester	24	23	1	Male	Black	South Carolina	Electrocution	
31	April 21, 1952	Saul James	28	Unknown	Unknown	Male	Black	Florida	Electrocution	
32	April 25, 1952	Lloyd Edison Sampsell	52	47	5	Male	White	California	Gas chamber	
33	April 25, 1952	Arthur Darden	22	21	1	Male	Black	Georgia	Electrocution	
34	April 26, 1952	William Kary Jones	58	57	1	Male	White	Texas	Electrocution	
35	April 30, 1952	Roland Dean Sundahl	21	20	1	Male	White	Nebraska	Electrocution	
36	April 30, 1952	Henry Savage	26	23	3	Male	Black	Texas	Electrocution	
37	May 2, 1952	Cooper Drake	31	29	2	Male	Black	Alabama	Electrocution	
38	May 2, 1952	Andrew Smith	31	30	1	Male	Black	Alabama	Electrocution	
39	May 9, 1952	Levert Forrest	27	Unknown	Unknown	Male	Black	Alabama	Electrocution	
40	May 9, 1952	Stanley Buckowski	26	24	2	Male	White	California	Gas chamber	
41	May 9, 1952	James Cewrell Edwards	31	29	2	Male	Black	Ohio	Electrocution	
42	May 13, 1952	Frederick Bunk	28	24	4	Male	White	New Jersey	Electrocution	
43	May 13, 1952	Robert K. Jellison	25	21	4	Male	White	New Jersey	Electrocution	
44	May 13, 1952	Clarence Smith	41	37	4	Male	White	New Jersey	Electrocution	
45	June 4, 1952	Herman Lee Ross	32	28	4	Male	Black	Texas	Electrocution	
46	June 6, 1952	Herman Maxwell	22	19	3	Male	Black	Arkansas	Electrocution	
47	June 6, 1952	Napoleon Wise	21	20	1	Male	Black	Georgia	Electrocution	
48	June 6, 1952	John Andrew Roman	28	27	1	Male	Black	North Carolina	Gas chamber	
49	June 13, 1952	Roland Wyatt	28	27	1	Male	Black	South Carolina	Electrocution	
50	June 20, 1952	Aurelio Martinez	38	37	1	Male	Hispanic	California	Gas chamber	
51	June 30, 1952	Merlin James Leiby	25	22	3	Male	White	Florida	Electrocution	
52	July 10, 1952	Thomas Andrew Haley	27	26	1	Male	White	Texas	Electrocution	
53	July 11, 1952	John Henry Thornton	24	23	1	Male	Black	Georgia	Electrocution	
54	July 11, 1952	Paul Washington	26	22	4	Male	Black	Louisiana	Electrocution	
55	July 11, 1952	Ocie Jugger	27	23	4	Male	Black	Louisiana	Electrocution	
56	July 11, 1952	Chester Blane Gregg	58	57	1	Male	White	Ohio	Electrocution	
57	July 25, 1952	Fred M. Stroble	70	68	2	Male	White	California	Gas chamber	
58	July 25, 1952	William Andrew Tyler Jr.	20	18	2	Male	Black	District of Columbia	Electrocution	
59	July 25, 1952	James Blackston Jr.	29	28	1	Male	Black	Georgia	Electrocution	
60	July 25, 1952	James Brent Durr	24	23	1	Male	Black	Mississippi	Electrocution	
61	August 1, 1952	Wilson Wright	19	19	0	Male	Black	Arkansas	Electrocution	
62	August 4, 1952	Edward James Beckwith	31	27	4	Male	White	Iowa	Hanging	
63	August 8, 1952	Wayne LeRoy Long	26	24	2	Male	White	Oregon	Gas chamber	
64	August 8, 1952	Major Preston	34	32	2	Male	Black	Texas	Electrocution	
65	August 25, 1952	Albert Jackson Jr.	24	23	1	Male	Black	Virginia	Electrocution	
66	August 26, 1952	Irving Donald Peterson	33	32	1	Male	Black	New Jersey	Electrocution	
67	September 8, 1952	George Willis Story	52	49	3	Male	White	Florida	Electrocution	
68	September 26, 1952	Walter Bentley	30	Unknown	Unknown	Male	Black	Louisiana	Electrocution	
69	October 7, 1952	Horace Johnson	29	Unknown	Unknown	Male	Black	Georgia	Electrocution	
70	October 10, 1952	Desmond Miles	35	34	1	Male	White	Alabama	Electrocution	
71	October 17, 1952	Bernice Davis	23	21	2	Male	Black	Illinois	Electrocution	
72	October 17, 1952	LeRoy Lindsay	31	29	2	Male	Black	Illinois	Electrocution	
73	October 28, 1952	Willie Porter	29	29	0	Male	Black	Missouri	Gas chamber	
74	October 28, 1952	Booker T. Reed	46	45	1	Male	Black	Texas	Electrocution	
75	October 30, 1952	Wallace Ford Jr.	31	30	1	Male	Black	New York	Electrocution	
76	October 30, 1952	Edward Henry Kelly	53	50	3	Male	White	New York	Electrocution	
77	October 31, 1952	Bernard Austin Gilliam	38	37	1	Male	White	California	Gas chamber	
78	November 13, 1952	Domingo Echeverria	60	59	1	Male	Hispanic	Nevada	Gas chamber	
79	November 21, 1952	Henry Savage	35	Unknown	Unknown	Male	Black	Georgia	Electrocution	
80	December 2, 1952	Alton Paris	59	59	0	Male	Black	Texas	Electrocution	
81	December 12, 1952	William Edward Cook Jr.	23	22	1	Male	White	California	Gas chamber	

== Demographics ==
Gender
Male	81	100%
Female	0	0%
Ethnicity
Black	47	58%
White	32	40%
Hispanic	2	2%
State
Georgia	11	14%
Texas	10	12%
California	9	11%
South Carolina	6	7%
Alabama	4	5%
Florida	4	5%
Illinois	4	5%
New Jersey	4	5%
Ohio	4	5%
Kentucky	3	4%
Louisiana	3	4%
New York	3	4%
Arkansas	2	2%
District of Columbia	2	2%
Mississippi	2	2%
Pennsylvania	2	2%
Iowa	1	1%
Kansas	1	1%
Missouri	1	1%
Nebraska	1	1%
Nevada	1	1%
North Carolina	1	1%
Oregon	1	1%
Virginia	1	1%
Method
Electrocution	66	81%
Gas chamber	13	16%
Hanging	2	2%
Month
January	6	7%
February	8	10%
March	7	9%
April	15	19%
May	8	10%
June	7	9%
July	9	11%
August	6	7%
September	2	2%
October	9	11%
November	2	2%
December	2	2%
Age
10–19	2	2%
20–29	37	46%
30–39	24	30%
40–49	10	12%
50–59	6	7%
60–69	1	1%
70–79	1	1%
Total	81	100%

== Executions in recent years ==
Number of executions
1953	63
1952	81
1951	101
Total	245

Preceded by 1951	List of people executed in the United States in 1952	Succeeded by 1953
