= Freight Train Riders of America =

American gang

The Freight Train Riders of America (FTRA) is a group known for moving around America by freight hopping ("catching out") in railroad cars. They have been particularly active in the northwestern United States.

There are conflicting accounts of the nature of the FTRA, ranging from an informal and loose group of individuals united by lifestyle to accounts of a criminal organization.

== History and background ==
The FTRA is sometimes claimed to have been founded by a group of Vietnam veterans in 1984 in a Montana bar. Members of the FTRA claim to be a loosely knit group of people who share a similar lifestyle, and who organise for mutual support. FTRA members mostly frequent the BNSF Railway's Hi-Line, which stretches from Chicago to Seattle, often sleeping in switching yards, bridge underpasses, and boxcars along the route.

An offshoot of the FTRA, known as the Blood Bound Railroad Gang, distinguishes themselves by wearing red bandanas instead of the FTRA's black bandanas.

In 2011, Gus Melonas, a spokesman for the BNSF, said the "FTRA and associated act[s] of riding and living on the rails have gone largely extinct."

== Criminal accusations ==
Retired Spokane police officer Bob Grandinetti has specialized in investigating the FTRA & FTRC both as a Spokane police officer and since his retirement. He claims members of the group are linked to food stamp and benefit fraud, illegal drug trafficking, and thefts, as well as brutal assaults and murders committed against other transients, vagrants, and the public. These crimes and incidents have been linked to FTRA and FTRC members:

- The 1996 revenge shooting of 30-year-old Joseph "F-Trooper" Perrigo by fellow FTRA member Martin "Mississippi Bones" Moore following an altercation in 1995 in which Moore was wounded. F-Trooper had an arm tattoo reading "FTRA", leading investigators to believe that the organization was indeed factual and not an urban legend. Moore is currently serving a 25-year sentence for the murder.
- A series of murders of transients along the rails committed by serial murderer, Robert Joseph Silveria Jr. ("Sidetrack", "Boxcar Bob"), drew police and media attention towards the FTRA. Possible connections to a murder in May 1996 murder led to the organization being profiled on America's Most Wanted. Silveria denies membership of the FTRA, but former police officer Bill Palmini, provides some conflicting testimony in his book Murder on the Rails. Silveria is currently serving double life sentences in Wyoming for the murders.
- Michael Elijah Adams ("Dirty Mike"), a native of Michigan, started hopping trains at age 14 and went on to kill more than 16 fellow drifters, according to his reckoning. He is currently serving 15 years to life for the killing of train-rider John Owens in Placer County, California. He is also a suspect in murders in Texas and Washington, among others. Adams has repeatedly claimed in interviews to have learned how to commit serial murder by rail by suspected FTRA enforcer and convicted murderer John "Dogman Tony" Boris (Hugh Ross). Adams was arrested in 2011 for beating to death a fellow transient named John Selmer Owens. Adams has also been connected to the 2006 murder of Robert Allen Chassereau in Virginia. In an interview conducted at Henrico County jail while awaiting sentencing for the murder of Chassereau, Adams remarked how many people he'd killed by saying, “More than 16, less than 30...I’m proud of what I did.”
- A train derailment occurred in Spokane in 1991, in which an unidentified person was found to have severed the airline to the rear cars' brakes. The suspect was killed during the derailment, and the body was recovered wearing a black bandanna with the signature silver-ring conch. This derailment and another during the same week could have been intended to deter the rail companies from acting against FTRA, however increased security measures were later taken.
- Robert James LeCou, who was convicted of a 2016 triple homicide in Belfry, Montana, and sentenced to 300 years in prison, is said to have been a member of the FTRA.

Any categorization of the FTRA as an organization is a loose one at best, due to the inherent transient nature of rail riding. There is no clear count of membership, however that may be defined. This leads to contradictory information about the FTRA as an organized criminal group. Author Richard Grant writes that various FTRA members, including American founder D. Boone, maintain that the group was founded on the basis of camaraderie between people sharing a similar lifestyle, and not as a criminal organization.

== The FTRA and FTRC in popular culture ==
- Authors Bill Palmini and Bob Grandinetti and science-fiction writer Lucius Shepard have written about the FTRA, as has William T. Vollmann, most notably in his book on freighthopping called Riding Toward Everywhere.
- Members of the FTRA appear in issue six of the comic book Y: The Last Man, in the collection Cycles (ISBN 1-4012-0076-1) and Deluxe Book One (ISBN 1-4012-1921-7)
- The FTRA is featured in the television drama Numb3rs in the first season on the episode "Sabotage". (ISBN 1-4157-2025-8)
- The band Deadbolt references the FTRA in the lyrics of multiple songs on their 2001 train-themed album Hobo Babylon.
- The 1999 Stephen J Cannell novel The Devil's Workshop depicts the FTRA and FTRC as a white-supremacist cult who seeks to release a biological agent into a milk transport.
- The band Yes Ma'am references the FTRA in their 2024 song "The FTRA Took My Baby Away" from the album How Many People How Many Dogs.

== See also ==
- Robert Joseph Silveria, Jr. (the "Boxcar Killer")
