= Robert Joseph Silveria Jr. =

American serial killer

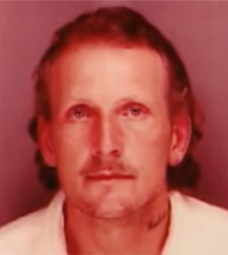
- Mug shot of Silveria in 1996
- Born: Robert Joseph Silveria Jr. March 3, 1959 (age 67); Redwood City, California, U.S.
- Other names: The Boxcar Killer; Sidetrack
- Convictions: Oregon; Aggravated murder (2 counts); Kansas; First degree murder Florida; First degree murder
- Penalty: Life imprisonment

Details
- Victims: 9–30+
- Span of crimes: 1981–1996
- Country: United States
- States: California; Oregon; Utah; Arizona; Kansas; Washington; Florida
- Date apprehended: March 2, 1996
- Imprisoned at: Wyoming Medium Correctional Institution, Torrington, Wyoming

Robert Joseph Silveria Jr. (born March 3, 1959), also known as The Boxcar Killer, is an American serial killer currently serving double life sentences in Wyoming. Silveria was also convicted in Kansas for the killing of Charles Randall Boyd, and in Florida for the killing of Willie Clark.

For 15 years, Silveria rode the rails, killing fellow freight-train riders throughout the United States. A police detective and prosecutor in Salem, Oregon, unravelled the truth of Silveria's killing spree, which began with a murder in Salem. By the end of their investigation, Silveria had confessed to murdering 28 people.

Silveria is currently imprisoned in Wyoming Medium Correctional Institution in Torrington, Wyoming.

== Victims ==
Willie James Clark, 54, was found dead on April 28, 1994, in Tallahassee, Florida. Clark, though homeless, worked as a Salvation Army bell ringer. He was robbed and suffered a fatal blow to the head.

Darren Royal Miller, 19, was found dead in his sleeping bag on July 8, 1992, in Thompson Springs, Utah. Miller and two friends stopped to party one night near a pond, and Miller was found the following morning with severe head injuries. Though never charged, Silveria was linked to the murder of Miller following his arrest.

Michael A. Garfinkle, 20, was found bludgeoned to death on August 2, 1994, in Emeryville, California. Garfinkle, originally from Tarzana, recently graduated from Pierce College and was planning to ride boxcars with a friend to Santa Cruz, California. After Silveria confessed, police noted that he had intimate knowledge of the crime.

Roger Lee Bowman, 38, was found dead on April 21, 1995, in Salt Lake City, Utah. Bowman was last seen walking his dog along the train tracks. Police had already identified Silveria as a suspect before he confessed to beating and stabbing Bowman, but they were looking for him using the alias Brad Foster.

James E. McLean, 50, was found stabbed to death on July 23, 1995, in his shack at a homeless encampment in Albany, Oregon. Silveria confessed he met McLean walking along the railroad tracks near his shack. After McLean was murdered, Silveria stole his money.

Charles Randall Boyd, 46, was found bludgeoned to death on July 28, 1995, in a collapsed tent in a Kanopolis Lake campground. Boyd met Silveria in El Paso, Texas, while Boyd was building a bunkhouse for a youth ranch and later traveled with him to Kansas.

Paul Wayne Matthews, 43, was found dead on October 15, 1995, in a homeless encampment outside Whitefish, Montana. Following his arrest on March 2, 1996, Silveria confessed to killing Matthews.

William Avis Pettit Jr., 39, was found bludgeoned to death on December 3, 1995, in a boxcar in Millersburg, Oregon.

Michael Andrew Clites, 24, was found bludgeoned to death on December 5, 1995, in Portland, Oregon.

At the time of Silveria's arrest, he was found with Pettit's backpack, social security card, birth certificate, food stamps, and hair beads. Also in the backpack was Matthews' identification card and food stamp documents, as well as Boyd's credit cards.

In January 1998, Silveria pleaded guilty to the murders of Pettit and Clites in Oregon. As a result, he avoided a possible death sentence and was instead sentenced to two consecutive life terms.

== See also ==
- Freight Train Riders of America

General:

- List of serial killers in the United States
- List of serial killers by number of victims
