= Fordyce, Nebraska =

- Village
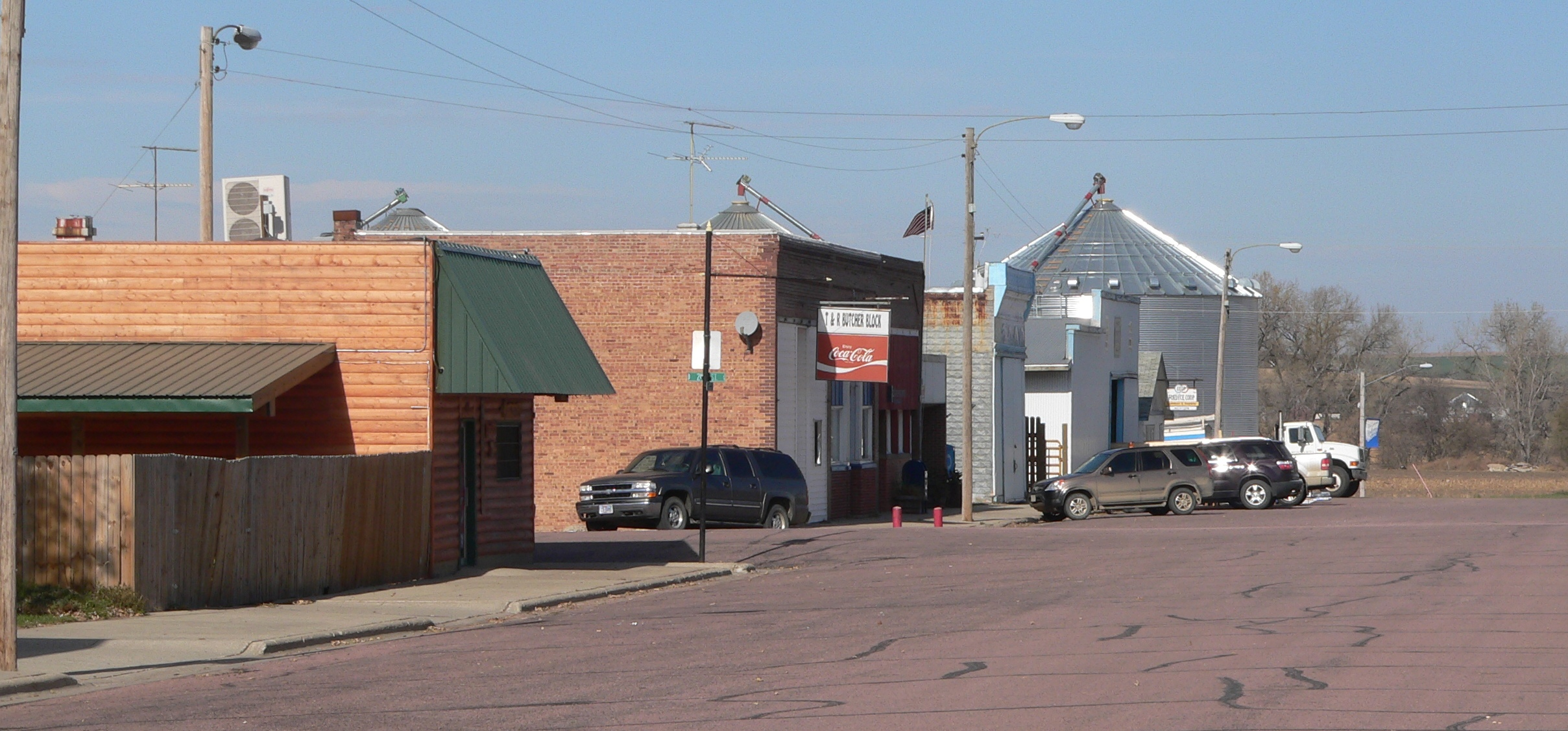
- Main Street

- Location of Fordyce, Nebraska
- Coordinates: 42°41′54″N 97°21′46″W
- Country: United States
- State: Nebraska
- County: Cedar

Area
  - Total: 0.15 sq mi (0.38 km^{2})
  - Land: 0.15 sq mi (0.38 km^{2})
  - Water: 0 sq mi (0.00 km^{2})
- Elevation: 1,365 ft (416 m)

Population (2020)
  - Total: 133
  - Estimate (2021): 132
  - Density: 921.6/sq mi (355.84/km^{2})
- Time zone: UTC-6 (Central (CST))
  - Summer (DST): UTC-5 (CDT)
- ZIP code: 68736
- Area code: 402
- FIPS code: 31-17110
- GNIS feature ID: 2398893

Fordyce is a village in Cedar County, Nebraska, United States. The population was 133 at the 2020 census.

== History ==
Fordyce got its start in 1907 when the railroad was extended to that point. It was named for William B. Fordyce, a railroad dispatcher.

== Geography ==
According to the United States Census Bureau, the village has a total area of 0.14 square miles (0.36 km^{2}), all land.

== Demographics ==
Historical population
Census	Pop.	Note	%±
1920	150		—
1930	192		28.0%
1940	202		5.2%
1950	165		−18.3%
1960	143		−13.3%
1970	146		2.1%
1980	148		1.4%
1990	190		28.4%
2000	182		−4.2%
2010	139		−23.6%
2020	134		−3.6%
U.S. Decennial Census

=== 2010 census ===
As of the census of 2010, there were 139 people, 60 households, and 41 families residing in the village. The population density was 992.9 inhabitants per square mile (383.4/km^{2}). There were 64 housing units at an average density of 457.1 per square mile (176.5/km^{2}). The racial makeup of the village was 98.6% White and 1.4% from two or more races. Hispanic or Latino of any race were 6.5% of the population.

There were 60 households, of which 28.3% had children under the age of 18 living with them, 60.0% were married couples living together, 5.0% had a female householder with no husband present, 3.3% had a male householder with no wife present, and 31.7% were non-families. 30.0% of all households were made up of individuals, and 16.6% had someone living alone who was 65 years of age or older. The average household size was 2.32, and the average family size was 2.90.

The median age in the village was 44.8 years. 25.2% of residents were under the age of 18; 3.6% were between the ages of 18 and 24; 21.7% were from 25 to 44; 29.4% were from 45 to 64; and 20.1% were 65 years of age or older. The gender makeup of the village was 53.2% male and 46.8% female.

=== 2000 census ===
As of the census of 2000, there were 182 people, 65 households, and 46 families residing in the village. The population density was 1,173.1 inhabitants per square mile (452.9/km^{2}). There were 66 housing units at an average density of 425.4 per square mile (164.2/km^{2}). The racial makeup of the village was 100.00% White, Hispanic or Latino of any race were 4.95% of the population.

There were 65 households, out of which 44.6% had children under the age of 18 living with them, 64.6% were married couples living together, 4.6% had a female householder with no husband present, and 27.7% were non-families. 26.2% of all households were made up of individuals, and 15.4% had someone living alone who was 65 years of age or older. The average household size was 2.80, and the average family size was 3.47.

In the village, the population was spread out, with 36.3% under the age of 18, 2.7% from 18 to 24, 24.7% from 25 to 44, 17.0% from 45 to 64, and 19.2% who were 65 years of age or older. The median age was 38 years. For every 100 females, there were 100.0 males. For every 100 females age 18 and over, there were 100.0 males.

As of 2000, the median income for a household in the village was $34,688, and the median income for a family was $37,031. Males had a median income of $27,083 versus $16,786 for females. The per capita income for the village was $14,608. About 2.4% of families and 4.3% of the population were below the poverty line, including none of those under the age of eighteen and 22.6% of those 65 or over.

== Notable person ==
James Lammers, a mass murderer who killed his wife, their three children, and unborn child
