= William Jackson Marion =

American man wrongfully executed for murder (1849 – 1887)

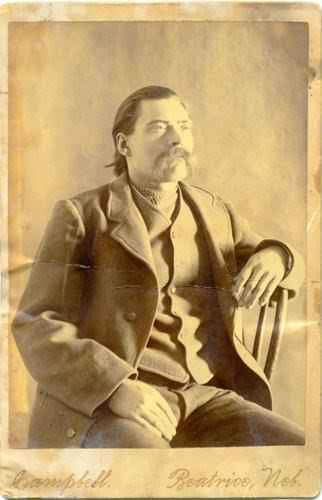
Portrait of Marion from the 1880s

William Jackson "Jack" Marion (May 13, 1849 – March 25, 1887) was an American man who was convicted of the 1872 murder of John Cameron, a Kansas native and a friend. Marion and Cameron were railroad workers who embarked on a trip to Kansas to work on the railroad in 1872. During the trip, Cameron went missing, spurring an investigation into his whereabouts. In 1873, a decomposing body was discovered in a Nebraska riverbed wearing clothing that some claimed to have belonged to Cameron, leading authorities to believe that Marion may have murdered Cameron. Years later, following a two-month trial and conviction, the state of Nebraska executed Marion for Cameron's murder in 1887.

Four years after Marion's execution, Cameron reappeared alive. Cameron's reappearance proved that Marion was wrongfully executed for Cameron's murder. On March 25, 1987, the 100th anniversary of his hanging, Marion was granted a posthumous pardon.

== Early life ==
Marion was born in Mahaska County, Iowa on May 13, 1849 to Tipton Marion (1824 – 1909) and his wife, Margret McMains (1823 – 1868). On November 6, 1871, he married Lydia Jane Finley in Gage County, Nebraska.

== Wrongful arrest, prosecution and execution of William Jackson Marion ==
In early May 1872, William Jackson Marion and his friend John Cameron began a trip from Liberty, Nebraska, to Valley Falls, Kansas (formerly known as Grasshopper Falls), to work on the railroad. They stopped for the night in Wild Cat Creek, Nebraska and stayed at the home of Marion's mother-in-law, Rachel Warren.

On May 5, 1872, Marion returned to his mother-in-law's home with Cameron's team of horses, but without Cameron. Marion's mother-in-law suspected that he had killed Cameron, and eventually Marion left Nebraska. In March 1873, a decomposing body was found in a riverbed in Gage County, Nebraska, wearing clothing that unidentified witnesses claimed to be John Cameron's. Marion was named a suspect, although he was not then located.

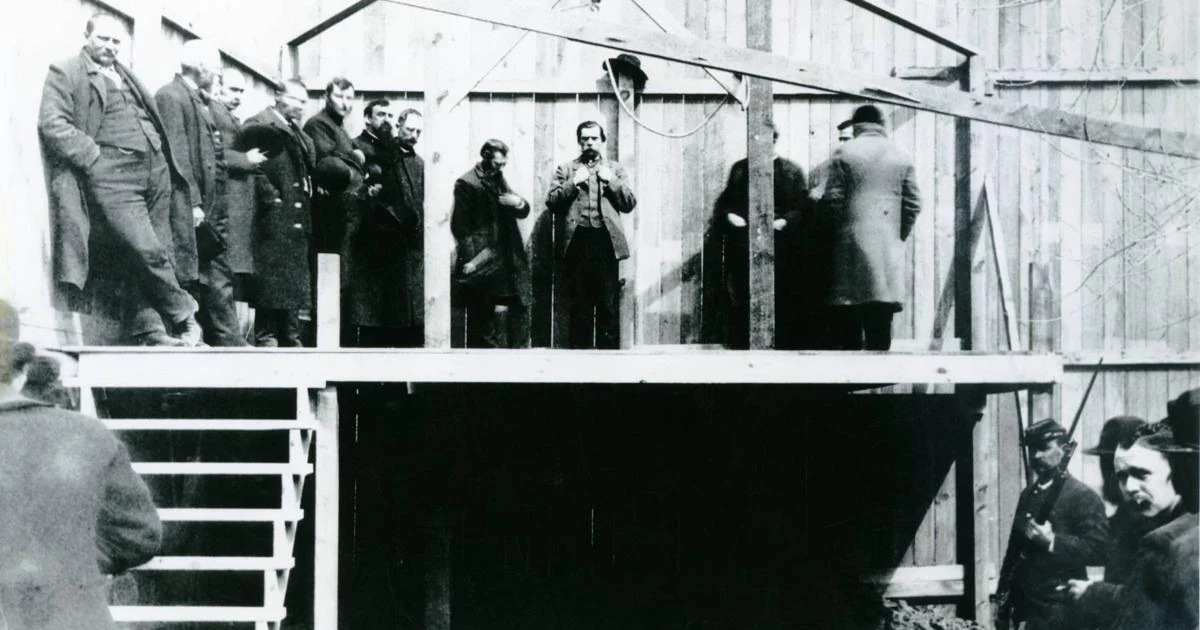
Marion at the gallows shortly before his execution

During December 1882, Marion was located in a county jail cell at Sedan, Kansas, in Chautauqua County, awaiting trial on a charge of stealing. He was taken to Beatrice, Nebraska, where he was indicted for the murder of John Cameron. A jury convicted him, and the judge sentenced him to death. The trial took two months. On appeal, the Nebraska Supreme Court vacated the conviction and ordered a new trial, noting that by Nebraska law at the time of the murder, a death sentence had to be decided by a jury, not a judge. Upon his second conviction, Marion was again sentenced to death and, after losing a second appeal, was hanged in Beatrice, Nebraska, on March 25, 1887. An article in the Omaha Daily Bee on March 26, 1887, declared there to be "no doubt that he was guilty and also guilty of other murders in the Indian Territory."

== Re-appearance of John Cameron ==
Four years after Marion was executed, in 1891, John Cameron was found alive and explained that he had, during the nearly twenty years since his "murder", traveled to Mexico, Alaska, and Colorado. In a written statement provided by Marion's uncle William Wymore, Cameron explained that he had fled due to fear of a paternity allegation. John Cameron said he had sold his team of horses to Marion and still had the note Marion had given him for payment of the remainder.

== Pardon of William Jackson Marion ==
On March 25, 1987, Marion was pardoned posthumously by the State of Nebraska, on the 100th anniversary of his hanging.

== In the news ==
A February 2013 documentary entitled "...until he is dead. A history of Nebraska's death penalty," discussed at length the hanging and later pardon of William Jackson Marion.

== See also ==
- Capital punishment in Nebraska
- List of people executed in Nebraska (pre-1972)
- List of wrongful convictions in the United States
- Wrongful execution
