= Roland Sundahl =

American murderer

Roland Dean Sundahl (June 20, 1930 – April 30, 1952) was an American murderer, electrocuted in Nebraska's electric chair for the attempted rape and murder of 16-year-old Bonnie Lou Merrill.

== Background ==
Roland Sundahl was married with two young children. Described as a laborer, he was also said to be a calm man, not easily angered, and kind to people and animals. Still, his family was not prosperous; Sundahl's meager wages were just enough to afford the family of four a derelict cottage behind his parents' home. His family reported that in the year or so before the crime, his health had changed for the worse. Suffering from headaches, he became moody and depressed.

== Crime ==
Bonnie Lou Merrill disappeared from the Y-Knot Cafe in Columbus, Nebraska, over Labor Day weekend in 1950. She had only been working there for two days before she went missing, and had not collected her paycheck since her shift on August 27, 1950.

The police, upon investigating the crime, found that Merrill had had a date with a boy named Ronald Kasper, who was being driven by Roland Sundahl. They met with Merrill at the Y-Knot Cafe, and the trio began to drive around. When the night ended and Kasper left, he requested that Merrill be driven home. Instead of driving her home, however, Sundahl drove Merrill to Lake Babcock, north of Columbus, and made romantic advances towards her. When she resisted, he choked her, beat her with a hatchet, and hid her body in the weeds by Lake Babcock. After his arrest, Sundahl told police that after hiding the body, he went to a nearby filling station and slept in his car after downing a cup of coffee.

Subsequent to the disappearance of Merrill, her boss, Jim Cumming, drove all of his employees home after their shifts ended.

== Investigation and arrest ==
At first, there were three main suspects: Herman Fried, a boy who was reported to have pestered Merrill for her affections; Kasper, Bonnie's date that night; and Sundahl. However, the police didn't have concrete evidence against any one of them, because none had the telltale scratch marks of having engaged in a struggle with the victim. The police chief thought Sundahl was the main suspect, so he was quickly brought into the station and washed off. It was discovered that he had covered the scars of his struggle with Bonnie by using her makeup. Minutes after being discovered with the scars, he broke down and confessed to the crime.

== Trial and execution ==
Charged in Platte County with first-degree murder and attempted rape, Sundahl faced a jury of 12 men three months after the crime. An unsuccessful insanity defense was given. A psychiatric evaluation concluded that Sundahl tended to withdraw from people into a "dream world of fantasy." Upon receiving a second examination from a different doctor, however, it was determined that he knew his ethics and had no history of mental illness. Sundahl himself testified at his trial and said that Bonnie's murder was "like a dream" and that he "[couldn't] believe it was possible." His mother collapsed in the courtroom on several occasions, while his wife burst into hysterics and made many outbursts.

After nine hours, Roland Sundahl was found guilty of first degree murder. He was sentenced to death. Upon hearing the sentence, he put his head in his hands and wept. Motions for a new trial and a Nebraska Supreme Court appeal were made. They both failed, so Sundahl's legal counsel filed for a stay of the sentence, then a rehearing in the case. Finally, an appeal was made to the U.S. Supreme Court. All three failed. While awaiting the decision on commutation from the state prison board, Sundahl attempted suicide while in prison by cutting his wrists with a pencil sharpener blade, hidden in his Bible. The blade was hidden by Sundahl cutting a small hole into several pages, and directly above the hole, he underlined, "He maketh me to lie down in green pastures; he leadeth me beside the still waters." Subsequent to the suicide attempt, he was put under 24-hour suicide watch.

His request for commutation was denied. Twenty months after Merrill's death, on April 30, 1952, Sundahl entered the execution chamber. He was seated in the electric chair, made no final statement, and was pronounced dead three minutes after entering the chamber.

== See also ==
- List of people executed in Nebraska (pre-1972)
- List of people executed in the United States in 1952

Executions carried out in Nebraska
Preceded by Timothy Iron Bear December 1, 1948	Roland Sundahl; April 30, 1952	Succeeded by Charles Starkweather June 25, 1959
