= Henry Ruhl =

American murderer (1909–1945)

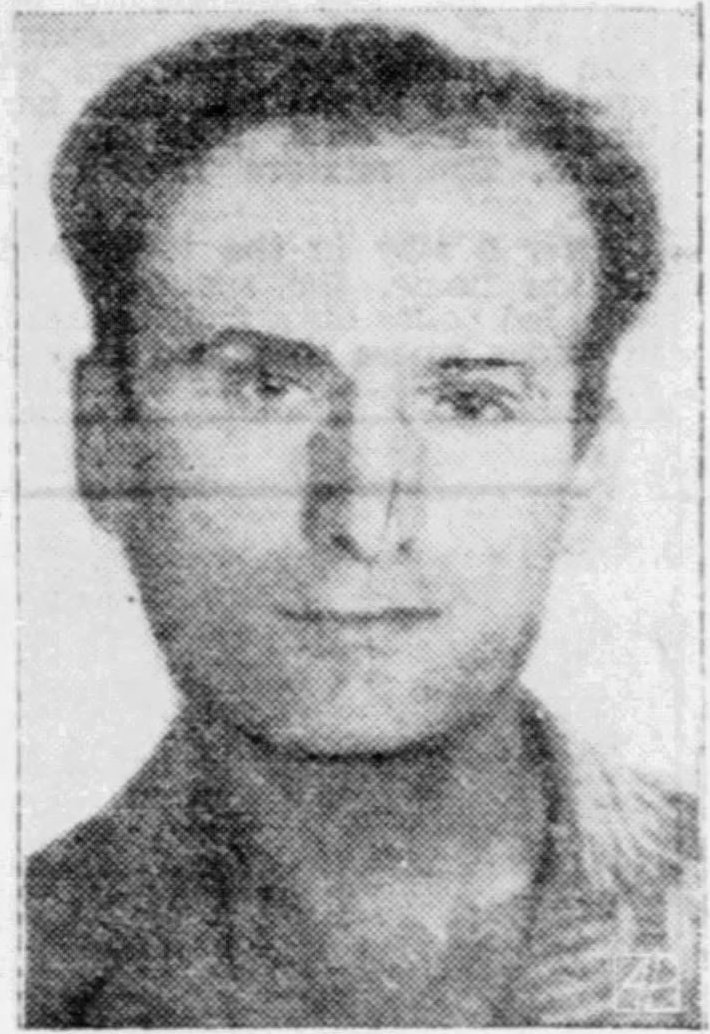
- Mugshot of Henry Ruhl, c. 1944
- Born: February 26, 1909; Kansas, U.S.
- Died: April 27, 1945 (aged 36); Wyoming State Penitentiary, Wyoming, U.S.
- Status: Executed by gas chamber
- Conviction: First degree murder
- Penalty: Death

Details
- Victims: 3
- Date: June 30 – July 2, 1943
- Country: United States
- State: Wyoming
- Date apprehended: November 22, 1943

Henry Ruhl (February 26, 1909 – April 27, 1945) was a spree killer and the only person executed in Wyoming by the U.S. government. This was also the second-to-last pre-Furman execution in the state and third-to-last as of 2022.

Ruhl was convicted of the June 30, 1943, murder of Matt Katmo, a Cheyenne war plant worker, at a campground on a military reservation seven miles east of Laramie. Authorities also suspected the same person who murdered Katmo in the murders of Mr. and Mrs. Percy Cota near Laramie two days after Katmo's murder, although Ruhl was never charged. Initially, authorities believed a man named Howard Pickell was responsible for all three murders, and Pickell went as far as to give a false confession, but following Ruhl's guilty plea and a further investigation into the evidence, Pickell was exonerated.

As Katmo's murder occurred on a government reservation, the homicide was considered a federal capital crime, and Ruhl accordingly received a federal death sentence. At the time, federal death sentences were carried out in the state or territory where the crime took place and by the method of execution that the respective state or territory utilized, so Ruhl was put to death by gas chamber in the Wyoming State Penitentiary in Rawlins. Ruhl's execution was the first under new US President Harry S. Truman.

== Early life ==
Ruhl was a native of Kansas, born on February 26, 1909.

Prior to the murder which led to his execution, Ruhl served 11 years in prison in the Washington State Penitentiary for leading a gang in a 1930 bank robbery in Chelan, Washington.

== Murders and arrest of Howard Pickell ==
On June 30, 1943, Matt Katmo, a 44-year-old resident of Cheyenne, accompanied Mrs. O.W. Larson to a mountain campground on a military reservation near Dale Creek, south of Laramie, Wyoming. When they stopped to pick flowers, a man, later revealed to be Henry Ruhl, accosted the two. Larson was bound and pistol-whipped, while Katmo was shot three or four times. Larson survived the attack, but Katmo died from his injuries. The gunman fled the scene in Katmo's car and later abandoned it elsewhere. Two days later, middle-aged couple Mr. and Mrs. Percy Cota were shot to death in their ranch home near Laramie.

Following an intensive manhunt of the area around Dale Creek, 26-year-old Syracuse native Howard William Pickell was arrested on July 3, 1943, in Pine Bluffs, Wyoming. Pickell confessed not only to the murder of Katmo and the binding and beating of Larson, but to participating in the murders of the Cotas. He claimed that he tied a rope around Mrs. Cota's neck, while an accomplice, who he only identified as a soldier named "Teddy," shot the couple to death. As for his motive in Katmo's murder, Pickell claimed that he murdered Katmo for refusing to submit to an attempted carjacking. Initially, Larson identified Pickell as her assailant and Katmo's murderer, and a coroner's jury found Pickell criminally responsible for the three murders on the basis of his confession; subsequently, Pickell was charged with the first-degree murder of Katmo. Authorities declared their intention to seek the death penalty against Pickell.

In early August 1943, Pickell rescinded all of his confessions in the murders of Katmo and Mr. and Mrs. Cota, as well as the assault of Larson. Notably, Pickell never signed an official confession in any of the crimes; he stated through his attorney that his confessions were "a bunch of lies" and denied any involvement. With the retraction of his confessions, Pickell also withdrew his guilty pleas in the crimes. Later in August, Pickell revealed that his draft card proved his presence in California on June 30, the day of Katmo's murder, thus establishing an alibi; nevertheless, authorities did not drop charges against Pickell.

== Arrest and trial of Henry Ruhl ==
Even after Pickell's confessions and charges, authorities conducted a two-month search to identify the owner of a bloodstained revolver discovered in Matt Katmo's abandoned car. The search led to Henry Ruhl, who, on November 22, 1943, was arrested in Englewood, Colorado, in connection with the murder of Katmo. The gun was registered under Ruhl's name. At the time of Ruhl's arrest, several newspapers chose not to identify him by name, only calling him a 34-year-old transient laborer. Subsequent to his arrest in Englewood, he was extradited to a jail in Albany County, Wyoming.

On January 10, 1944, Ruhl pleaded guilty to state charges in the murder of Matt Katmo. Following Ruhl's guilty plea, Albany County District Attorney Lenoir Bell, who initially pressed for the death penalty against Pickell, requested that Pickell's charges be dismissed. On January 18, 1944, a judge signed an order dismissing Pickell's charges.

In March 1944, the United States federal government arraigned Ruhl on federal capital murder charges due to the fact that Katmo's murder occurred on a military reservation, which was federal property. Ruhl was subsequently transported to Cheyenne, Wyoming, to await trial.

In May 1944, Ruhl went on trial before a federal district court for the murder of Matt Katmo. The trial lasted four days and ended on May 26. The judge's instructions included the ability for the jury to find Ruhl guilty of involuntary or voluntary manslaughter, but the jury took two and a half hours to find Ruhl guilty of first-degree murder with no recommendation of mercy. The next day, a federal judge formally sentenced Ruhl to death, with his first execution date being set for June 30, 1944, coincidentally one year to the day of Katmo's murder.

== Execution ==
Ruhl appealed to the Tenth Circuit Court of Appeals in Denver. Both his conviction and death sentence were upheld. In the days leading up to his execution, Ruhl wrote to President Harry S. Truman requesting executive clemency. Truman denied clemency to Ruhl.

Ruhl maintained his innocence to the end. He did not request a special final meal or religious advisors, even as three separate ministers attempted to speak to him while he was in his cell on death row. Ruhl's execution took place on April 27, 1945, at approximately 12:21 a.m, in the gas chamber at the Wyoming State Penitentiary in Rawlins.

After his execution, authorities found a two-page letter Ruhl had written and directed towards police and prison guards in general. The Casper Star-Tribune described the letter as being "abusive," with Ruhl declaring that he would "meet the officers in hell and talk it over with them," and that he could "spill lots of dope" if he wanted to, but that he "was not crazy enough to do so".

Following his execution, Ruhl's body was buried in the penitentiary cemetery.

== See also ==
- Capital punishment by the United States federal government
- List of people executed by the United States federal government
- List of people executed in the United States in 1945
- List of people executed in Wyoming
