= List of people executed in Kansas =

This is a list of people executed in the U.S. state of Kansas.

No one has been executed by the state of Kansas since 1965, although capital punishment is legal there. Historically, 58 people have been executed in the area now occupied by the state. Many of these were federal executions of soldiers and POWs, often at the United States Disciplinary Barracks in Leavenworth. Fourteen German POWs were executed at Leavenworth in 1945.

The last executions in Kansas were at the Kansas State Penitentiary, when spree killers James Latham and George York were executed for murder in 1965. Except for John Coon, executed in 1853 by firing squad, all federal and state executions in Kansas have been by hanging.

== List of people executed in Kansas ==
Name	Race	Age	Date of execution	County	Crime	Victim(s)	Governor
Carl Horne	White	37	February 12, 1863	Leavenworth	Murder	John Philip Friend, white	Thomas Carney
William Griffith	White		October 30, 1863	Linn	Murder	Five people, white (Note: John Campbell, William Colpetzer, Michael Robinson, Patrick Ross, and William Stilwell.)	Thomas Carney
John Hendley	White		December 29, 1865	Franklin	Murder	John Sutton, white	Samuel J. Crawford
Ernest Wa-tee-cha	Native American	26	January 19, 1866	Douglas	Murder-Robbery	William Hastings, white	Samuel J. Crawford
Benjamin Lewis	Native American	27	August 10, 1866	Miami	Murder-Robbery	Benjamin Jones, white	Samuel J. Crawford
Martin W. Bates	White	19	February 20, 1867	Osage	Murder	Abel Polley, 61, white	Samuel J. Crawford
Scott Holderman	White	25	November 15, 1867	Linn	Murder-Robbery	John Carver, white (Note: Confessed to murdering 16 other people during American Civil War, but said all of them were pro-Confederate soldiers and civilians.)	Samuel J. Crawford
Melvin E. Baughn	White	32	September 18, 1868	Nemaha	Murder	Jesse S. Dennis, white (posse member)	Samuel J. Crawford
William Dickson	White	40	August 9, 1870	Leavenworth	Murder-Robbery	Jacob Barnett, white	James M. Harvey
Ernest L. Hoefgen	White	32	March 10, 1944 (Note: First execution at Kansas State Penitentiary.)	Marion	Murder	Bruce Smoll, 18, white (Note: Also murdered George Richet in Texas and sentenced to life. Hoefgen killed Smoll after escaping prison there.)	Andrew Frank Schoeppel
Fred L. Brady	White	46	April 15, 1944	Cowley	Murder-Robbery	Joe Williams, black	Andrew Frank Schoeppel
Clark B. Knox	Black	26	April 15, 1944	Wyandotte	Murder	Edward F. Nugent, 39, white (patrolman)	Andrew Frank Schoeppel
Cecil Tate	White	21	July 29, 1947	Kingman	Murder-Robbery	Arnold McClelland, 36, white (Note: Also murdered McClelland's father.)	Frank Carlson
George F. Gumtow	White	23	July 29, 1947	Kingman	Murder-Robbery	Arnold McClelland, 36, white	Frank Carlson
George Miller	Black	60	May 6, 1950	Miami	Murder	Mike Churchill, 48, white (police chief)	Frank Carlson
Preston McBride	White	25	April 6, 1951	Reno	Murder	John Watkins, white	Edward F. Arn
James Lammers	White	26	January 5, 1952	Doniphan	Murder	Four people, white (Note: His wife Geneva Orr (23) and children Lora Mae (3), Melba (2), and LaVerne (11 months).)	Edward F. Arn
Nathaniel Germany	Black	30	May 21, 1954	Wyandotte	Murder	David Gray, white	Edward F. Arn
Merle William Martin	White	45	July 16, 1954	Johnson	Murder	Willard Carver, 31, white (deputy sheriff)	Edward F. Arn
Lowell Lee Andrews	White	22	November 30, 1962	Wyandotte	Murder	Three people, white (Note: Father William (50), mother Opal (41), and sister Jennie (20).)	William Avery
Richard E. Hickock	White	31	April 14, 1965	Finney	Murder-Burglary	Clutter family (four people), white	William Avery
Perry Edward Smith	White	36	April 14, 1965	Finney	Murder-Burglary	Clutter family (four people), white	William Avery
George Ronald York	White	23	June 22, 1965	Wallace	Murder-Robbery	Otto Zeigler, 69, white (Note: Murdered seven other people in Florida, Tennessee, Illinois, and Colorado.)	William Avery
James Douglas Latham	White	23	June 22, 1965	Wallace	Murder-Robbery	Otto Zeigler, 69, white	William Avery

Note: This list only contains executions under state jurisdiction.

== See also ==
- Capital punishment in Kansas
- Capital punishment in the United States
- Crime in Kansas
- List of death row inmates in the United States § Kansas
- Lists of people from Kansas
