= George Floyd protests in Wyoming =

2020 civil unrest after the murder of George Floyd

- Part of George Floyd protests
- Date: May 29 – June 2020 (1 month and 1 day)
- Location: Wyoming, United States
- Caused by: Police brutality; Institutional racism against African Americans; Reaction to the murder of George Floyd; Economic, racial and social inequality

This is a list of protests in the U.S. State of Wyoming following the murder of George Floyd, an African-American, by a white police officer.

Wyoming's population is 93.2% White alone and 1.2% Black alone. Protests were organized by African-Americans, European-Americans and Native Americans.

== Locations ==
Cities in Wyoming that held a protest with approximately 100 or more participants

=== Casper ===
On June 3, Casper police counted 300 protesters who marched peacefully through downtown Casper. A splinter group, organized by Our Resistance Casper, continued a silent march against police brutality to the Dick Cheney Federal Building. Their silence was broken by applause, chantings, and series. The march remained peaceful even through other individuals carrying firearms gathered throughout downtown, including a group to 12 white individuals led by Dan Sabrosky who brought his AR-15 to "protect the First Amendment rights of the protesters," as Sabrosky said. Independent, secondary protests continued after the initial protest ended.

=== Cheyenne ===
On Friday evening, May 29, about 125 protesters attended a candlelight vigil in Cheyenne near the steps of the State Capitol. Additional protests were held on May 30 and 31.

=== Cody ===
On June 7, hundreds of protesters gathered in City Park, where they were surrounded by armed ex-police and military officers, but with no active police presence. The protesters held a moment of silence to honor George Floyd before marching peacefully around the park.

=== Gillette ===
Approximately 50 people held a protest in Gillette on June 2. The Black Lives Matter protests were met with an "All Lives Matter" counterprotest. Local law enforcement including a SWAT team accompanied both protests who marched from Campbell County Courthouse and a local park on a 4.5-mile loop. The protesters, counterprotesters, and police were all nonviolent.

=== Jackson ===
More than 150 people protested peacefully at Town Square on May 31, 2020, with less than a 24-hour notice. Luke Zender helped organize the Jackson protest and felt "as white-bodied individuals we have to take responsibility for the actions of our collective race." The protesters chanted and then kneeled in a minute of silence to honor the memory of George Floyd and others harmed by police brutality. The three-hour event remained peaceful despite some voiced opposition.

=== Laramie ===
In Laramie, protests responding to George Floyd's murder took place nightly for a span of three weeks. Billy Harris organized the first march downtown for June 2, 2022. An estimated 100 to 200 protesters marched through Laramie on June 2.

Meanwhile, initially questioning the effectiveness of marching, Timberly Vogel raised funds for Black causes. However, Vogel, Harris, and others joined forces for a sustained series of protests. By June 4, hundreds of protesters, possibly numbering more than 1,000, walked the streets of downtown Laramie. University of Wyoming football coach Craig Bohl even joined in one protest.

The protests highlighted other police killings, including Robbie Ramirez, an unarmed Laramie resident shot in the back and killed by the Albany County Sheriff's Deputy Derek Colling in 2018. The protests evolved to blocking traffic and supporting efforts for a grassroots organization Albany County for Proper Policing (ACOPP) seeking justice in the Ramirez case. CNN wrote, "The public outrage over Ramirez's death further fueled protests in Wyoming last summer amid nationwide demonstrations against police brutality and racial injustice following the killing of George Floyd." Albany County Sheriff Dave O’Malley retired preceding Ramirez's mother filing a successful lawsuit against the department, and the Albany County Board of Commissioners appointed Wyoming's first Black sheriff, Aaron Appelhans, on December 11, 2020.

=== Riverton ===
The small town of Riverton on the Wind River Indian Reservation held an early protest against George Floyd's murder at Riverton City Park. About 150 protesters gathered at a park on June 1. The organizers including Northern Arapaho youth, such as Micah Lott, who had also participated in the Dakota Access Pipeline protests at Standing Rock Sioux Reservation in North Dakota. These Native American youth had previously protested a proposed white supremacist group in Riverton in 2003, and since then a local Native school's annual Martin Luther King Jr. Day walk has provided a model for peaceful public protest for the community.

=== Rock Springs ===
About 10 people protested peacefully on Dewar Drive on June 2. One protester admitted he thought he would be pelted with eggs, but stated that people had been honking their horns or waving their hands to show support. One protester, however, stated that there was some resistance and that they were followed after they were done protesting. On the other side of the street, near the Rock Springs Chamber of Commerce, another protest began with protesters holding signs saying "All Lives Matter" and "Support Our Police."

=== Sheridan ===
On June 5, an estimated 500 to 600 people peacefully marched from the Sheridan County Fulmer Public Library to the Sheridan County Courthouse and back in support of Black Lives Matter. The Sheridan Police Department monitored the entire protest, but no violence occurred. There was some animosity with some counter-protesters, who shouted "Trump 2020" in response to the chant, "Wyoming is love." Non-protesters stood by with weapons such as rifles and bows and arrows in case of violence.
