= List of law enforcement agencies in Wyoming =

This is a list of law enforcement agencies in the state of Wyoming.

According to the US Bureau of Justice Statistics' 2008 Census of State and Local Law Enforcement Agencies, the state had 90 law enforcement agencies employing 1,691 sworn police officers, about 317 for each 100,000 residents.

== State agencies ==
- Wyoming Department of Transportation#Child agency
  - 511 Info Wyoming DOT 511 Info Road
  - Wyoming DOT Aeronautics
  - Wyoming Highway Patrol
  - WyDOT Tax Fuel
- Wyoming Department of Corrections
- Wyoming State Attorney General's Office
  - Division of Criminal Investigation
- Wyoming Game and Fish Department
  - Game Wardens
- Wyoming Division of State Parks and Historic Sites
  - Park Rangers
- Wyoming Department of Fire Prevention and Electrical Safety (State Fire Marshal)
  - Fire Investigation
- Wyoming Livestock Board
  - Law Enforcement
- Wyoming Gaming Commission (Employs two sworn investigators)
- Wyoming State Board of Outfitters and Professional Guides (Employs one sworn investigator)
- Wyoming Supreme Court (Employs one sworn bailiff)

== County agencies ==
- Albany County Sheriff's Office
- Big Horn County Sheriff's Office
- Campbell County Sheriff's Office
- Carbon County Sheriff's Office
- Converse County Sheriff's Office
- Crook County Sheriff's Office
- Fremont County Sheriff's Office
- Goshen County Sheriff's Office
- Hot Springs County Sheriff's Office
- Johnson County Sheriff's Office
- Laramie County Sheriff's Office
- Lincoln County Sheriff's Office
- Natrona County Sheriff's Office
- Niobrara County Sheriff's Office
- Park County Sheriff's Office
- Platte County Sheriff's Office
- Sheridan County Sheriff's Office
- Sublette County Sheriff's Office
- Sweetwater County Sheriff's Office
- Teton County Sheriff's Office
- Uinta County Sheriff's Office
- Washakie County Sheriff's Office
- Weston County Sheriff's Office

== Municipal agencies ==
- Afton Police Department
- Bairoil Police Department
- Basin Police Department
- Buffalo Police Department
- Casper Police Department
- Cheyenne Police Department
- Cody Police Department
- Cokeville Police Department
- Diamondville Police Department
- Douglas Police Department
- Encampment Police Department
- Evanston Police Department
- Evansville Police Department
- Frannie Police Department
- Gillette Police Department
- Glenrock Police Department
- Green River Police Department
- Greybull Police Department
- Guernsey Police Department
- Hanna Marshal's Office
- Hulett Police Department
- Jackson Police Department
- Kemmerer Police Department
- Lander Police Department
- Laramie Police Department
- Lingle Police Department
- Lovell Police Department
- Lusk Police Department
- Lyman Police Department
- Medicine Bow Marshal's Office
- Midwest Police Department
- Mills Police Department
- Moorcroft Police Department
- Mountain View Police Department
- Newcastle Police Department
- Pine Bluffs Police Department
- Powell Police Department
- Rawlins Police Department
- Riverton Police Department
- Rock Springs Police Department
- Saratoga Police Department
- Sheridan Police Department
- Shoshoni Police Department
- Sinclair Police Department
- Sundance Police Department
- Thayne Police Department
- Thermopolis Police Department
- Torrington Police Department
- Upton Police Department
- Wheatland Police Department
- Worland Police Department

== College and University agency ==
- University of Wyoming Police Department

== Other Organizations ==
- Wyoming Association of Sheriffs and Chiefs of Police (WASCOP)
