= James Lammers =

Executed American mass murderer

James Bernard Lammers
- Born: July 16, 1924; Fordyce, Nebraska, U.S.
- Died: January 5, 1952 (aged 27); Kansas State Penitentiary, Kansas, U.S.
- Occupation: Construction worker
- Spouse: Geneva Orr Lammers (murdered 1950)
- Children: 3
- Status: Executed by hanging
- Motive: Did not want more children
- Conviction: First degree murder (2 counts)
- Penalty: Death (March 7, 1951)

Details
- Victims: 5 (including an unborn baby)
- Date: December 12, 1950
- Country: United States
- Location: Troy, Kansas

James Bernard Lammers (July 16, 1924 – January 5, 1952) was an American mass murderer who murdered his pregnant wife and three children. On December 12, 1950, he strangled his wife, who was about seven months pregnant, to death, then set their trailer on fire, resulting in their children dying. James was convicted of two counts of first-degree murder, sentenced to death, and executed in 1952.

== Murders, trial, and execution ==
The family had moved into a trailer in Troy eight weeks before the murders after James found work as a bulldozer operator there. However, six weeks later, he was fired.

Early in the morning of December 13, 1950, the Lammers' family trailer was discovered on fire. Neighbors tried to help, but were unable to extinguish the blaze. The bodies of 23-year-old Geneva Orr Lammers, 3-year-old Laura Mae Lammers, 2-year-old Melva Jean Lammers, and nine-month-old LaVern Francis Lammers were found. The children were sleeping during the fire and had died from carbon monoxide poisoning.

The fire was initially thought to be accidental, and the police guessed that an exploding oil stove caused it. James Lammers was nowhere to be found. He returned to town on December 14, 1950, claiming he had been out looking for work, and that someone had recognized his truck in Topeka and told him about the fire.

Suspecting that James had intentionally set the fire, the police asked him to show them where he had traveled. James took the police to Independence, Missouri, then to Kansas City, Missouri. He attempted to provide an alibi by showing them a receipt for gas supposedly purchased on December 12, but the actual date, December 13, was smudged, and over it was written the number 12. James then took them to Topeka, Kansas, where he had supposedly spent the night in a hotel and mailed a letter home to his wife. The letter was dated December 14, 1950.

The group returned to Troy on December 15, and James was arrested and charged with first-degree murder the next day. Upon being woken up to the news, he replied, "Does it have to be as bad as that?"

James then confessed to the murders, saying he had strangled his wife to death, and then poured kerosene on her body and set it on fire to conceal the crime. Due to public anger over the allegations, James was moved to a private location for his safety. He claimed that his children had driven him crazy, and he feared having a fourth child. James took his wife to a doctor in Missouri, hoping for an abortion, but the doctor refused.

During his trial, a woman, 25-year-old Zada Spencer, said she and James had been having an affair for about a year, had a child together, and that he never told her he was married. According to Spencer, after learning she was pregnant, James said a friend of his, whose wife had died, had offered him his trailer home if he would take care of his three children. He asked Spencer if she would marry him on those conditions, but she declined. A friend of Spencer corroborated these allegations, but they were never confirmed.

The defense argued that James did not "appreciate the enormity of his act" and presented several witnesses who testified that he had a limited mental capacity. However, doctors who examined him said he was both competent and sane. On March 7, 1951, the jury found James guilty of two counts of first-degree murder and fixed his sentence at death.

After James's appeals failed, he was hanged at the Kansas State Penitentiary in Lansing on January 5, 1952. He declined a last meal. James's last words were "I have been treated very well." The trapdoor was sprung open at 1:01 a.m., and he was pronounced dead nine minutes later. James's parents declined to claim his body after his execution, and he is buried in Mt. Calvary Cemetery in Leavenworth, Kansas.

== See also ==
- Capital punishment in Kansas
- Familicide
- List of people executed in Kansas
- List of people executed in the United States in 1952
