= List of people executed in Nebraska (pre-1972) =

The following is a list of people executed by the U.S. state of Nebraska before capital punishment was resumed in the United States in 1976.

Thirty-four people, all male, were executed in Nebraska during the pre-Furman era, twenty-two by hanging and twelve by electrocution. The first execution in Nebraska reportedly was of Cyrus Tator, a former Kansas Legislature member and judge in Lykins County, Kansas who was tried and convicted of murdering his business partner in 1863.

== List of people executed in Nebraska (pre-1972) ==
No.	Name	Race	Age	Sex	Date of execution	County	Method	Victim(s)	Governor	Ref.
1	Stephen D. Richards	White	23	Male	April 26, 1879	Kearney	Hanging	Peter Anderson and Harlson family	Silas Garber	Ref.
2	Orlando Cassler	White	32	Male	May 20, 1879	Seward	Hanging	George L. Monroe	Albinus Nance	
3	Milton W. Smith	White	—	Male	July 24, 1885	Polk	Hanging	Ruth Smith, his wife	James W. Dawes	
4	Jim Reynolds	White	23	Male	May 21, 1886	Cheyenne	Hanging	James and John Pinkston	James W. Dawes	
5	William Jackson Marion	White	38	Male	March 25, 1887	Gage	Hanging	John Cameron (Note: Marion's uncle claimed that he saw Cameron alive in 1891, but produced no evidence to substantiate his claim. Marion received a posthumous pardon by Nebraska Governor Bob Kerrey on the 100th anniversary of his execution. In its decision, the Nebraska Board of Pardons said it made no determination about whether Marion was guilty or innocent.)	John Milton Thayer	
6	David Hoffman	White	—	Male	July 22, 1887	Otoe	Hanging	James B. DeWitt	John Milton Thayer	
7	Albert Haunstine	White	27	Male	May 17, 1891	Custer	Hanging	Hiram Roten and William Ashley	John Milton Thayer	
8	Christian Fuerst	White	20	Male	June 5, 1891 (Note: Although Christian Furst and Charles Shepherd are listed at 8 and 9, the two were hanged together simultaneously in the only double hanging in Nebraska's history.)	Dodge	Hanging	Carl J. Pulsifer	John Milton Thayer	
9	Charles Shepherd	White	20	Male	June 5, 1891	Dodge	Hanging	Carl J. Pulsifer	John Milton Thayer	
10	Ed Neil	—	—	Male	October 9, 1891	Douglas	Hanging	Allen and Dorothy Jones	John Milton Thayer	
11	Clinton E. Dixon (Note: Private Clinton Dixon and his victim Corporal Thomas Carter were both members of the U.S. Army (Sixth U.S. Cavalry) making Dixon's execution a U.S. military execution. As such, only the President could grant clemency. President Benjamin Harrison declined to intervene.)	—	—	Male	June 24, 1892	Douglas	Hanging	Corporal Thomas Carter	James E. Boyd	
12	Harry Hill	White	—	Male	March 1, 1895	Cass	Hanging	Mattes Akeson	Silas A. Holcomb	
13	Claude H. Hoover	—	—	Male	August 7, 1896	Douglas	Hanging	Samual DuBois	Silas A. Holcomb	
14	George W. Morgan	—	—	Male	October 8, 1897	Douglas	Hanging	Ida Gaskell	Silas A. Holcomb	
15	Gottlieb Neigenfiend	White	28	Male	March 13, 1903	Pierce	Hanging	Anna Bryer and Albert Bryer (Note: ex-wife and ex-father in law)	John H. Mickey	
16	William Rhea (Note: born William Cline)	White	19	Male	July 10, 1903	Dodge	Hanging	Herman Wilhelm F. Zahn	John H. Mickey	
17	Harrison Clark	Black	31	Male	December 13, 1907	Douglas	Hanging	Edward Flury	George L. Sheldon	
18	Frank Barker	White	27	Male	January 17, 1908	Webster	Hanging	Daniel and Alice Barker (Note: his brother and sister-in-law)	George L. Sheldon	
19	Robert Meade Shumway	White	27	Male	March 5, 1909	Gage	Hanging	Sarah E. Martin	Ashton C. Shallenberger	
20	Bert M. Taylor	White	39	Male	October 28, 1910	Kearney	Hanging	Pearl Florence Taylor (Note: Taylor was 16 when she was fatally injured, but 17 when she died.), white (niece) (Note: Also raped and attempted to murder Pearl's younger sister, Ida Taylor.)	Ashton C. Shallenberger	
21	Thomas Johnson	Black	39	Male	May 19, 1911	Douglas	Hanging	Henry R. Frankland	Chester H. Aldrich	
22	Albert Prince	Black	24	Male	March 21, 1913	Lancaster	Hanging	Edward D. Davis (Note: Nebraska DOC Deputy Warden)	John H. Morehead	
23	Allen Vincent Grammer	White	24	Male	December 20, 1920 (Note: Allen Grammer and Alson Cole were the first men electrocuted, and the only double electrocution in Nebraska. Allen Grammer was the first man to be electrocuted by the State of Nebraska, pronounced dead at 3:24 p.m. Alson Cole was pronounced dead at 3:37 p.m.)	Howard	Electrocution	Lulu Vogt (Note: Allen Grammer's mother in law)	Samuel R. McKelvie	
24	Alson B. Cole	White	24	Male	December 20, 1920	Howard	Electrocution	Lulu Vogt	Samuel R. McKelvie	
25	James B. King	Black	33	Male	June 9, 1922	Lancaster	Electrocution	Robert L. Taylor	Samuel R. McKelvie	
26	Walter Ray Simmons	White	24	Male	August 11, 1925	Boyd	Electrocution	Frank Herman Pahl	Adam McMullen	
27	Henry E. Bartlett	White	35	Male	April 29, 1927	Kearney	Electrocution	Asa Landon Ransom (Note: Minden, Nebraska Police Chief)	Adam McMullen	
28	Frank Carter	White	46	Male	June 24, 1927	Douglas	Electrocution	William McDevitt and Dr. A.D. Searles	Adam McMullen	
29	Frank E. Sharp	White	49	Male	October 19, 1928	Lancaster	Electrocution	Amanda Harriet Ostblom Sharp	Adam McMullen	
30	Henry J. Sherman	White	21	Male	May 31, 1929	Dawes	Electrocution	Three people, white (Note: Roger Pochon, 35, Hattie Pochon, 36, and Eugenie Pochon, 66. Sherman raped the 14-year-old daughter of Roger and Hattie Pochon, Nellie Pochon.)	Arthur J. Weaver	
31	Joseph T. MacAvoy	White	25	Male	March 23, 1945	Clay	Electrocution	Anna Milroy	Dwight Griswold	
32	Timothy Iron Bear	Native American	24	Male	December 1, 1948	Sheridan	Electrocution	John Wiley Stollar and Grace B. Stollar	Val Peterson	
33	Roland Dean Sundahl	White	21	Male	April 30, 1952	Platte	Electrocution	Bonnie Lou Merrill	Val Peterson	
34	Charles Raymond Starkweather	White	20	Male	June 25, 1959	Lancaster	Electrocution	Robert Jensen (Note: Although Charles Starkweather murdered 10 people in Nebraska (and one in Wyoming), he was tried, convicted, and executed for only one murder, that of 17-year-old Robert Jensen.)	Ralph G. Brooks	

== Demographics ==
Race
White	25	74%
Black	4	12%
Unknown race	4	12%
Native American	1	3%
Age
17-19	1	3%
20-29	17	50%
30–39	7	21%
Unknown age	7	21%
40–49	2	6%
Gender
Male	34	100%
Female	0	0%
Date of execution
1870–1879	2	6%
1880–1889	4	12%
1890–1899	8	24%
1900–1909	5	15%
1910–1919	3	9%
1920–1929	8	24%
1930–1939	0	0%
1940–1949	2	6%
1950–1959	2	6%
Method
Hanging	22	65%
Electrocution	12	35%
Governor (Party)
Silas Garber (R)	1	3%
Albinus Nance (R)	1	3%
James W. Dawes (R)	2	6%
John Milton Thayer (R)	6	18%
James E. Boyd (D)	1	3%
Silas A. Holcomb (F)	3	9%
John H. Mickey (R)	2	6%
George L. Sheldon (R)	2	6%
Ashton C. Shallenberger (D)	2	6%
Chester H. Aldrich (R)	1	3%
John H. Morehead (D)	1	3%
Samuel R. McKelvie (R)	3	9%
Adam McMullen (R)	4	12%
Arthur J. Weaver (R)	1	3%
Dwight Griswold (R)	1	3%
Val Peterson (R)	2	6%
Ralph G. Brooks (D)	1	3%

== See also ==
- Capital punishment in the United States
- Capital punishment in Nebraska
- Lists of people executed in the United States
- List of people executed in Nebraska
