= Capital punishment in Wyoming =

Capital punishment is a legal penalty in the U.S. state of Wyoming.

Since the reinstatement of the death penalty in the United States in 1976, Wyoming carried out only one execution: that of Mark Hopkinson in 1992 for ordering the murder of four people. As of March 2022, there are no defendants who are sentenced to death in Wyoming. The last defendant who was sentenced to death, Dale Eaton, had his death sentence overturned by the federal court of appeals for the tenth circuit, and was resentenced to life imprisonment without parole in March 2022.

Wyoming does not have a designated execution chamber, but the state has said it will use the parole board meeting room at the Wyoming State Penitentiary in the event an execution by lethal injection does occur in the future. The execution of Mark Hopkinson in 1992 took place in a converted holding cell at the since-closed North Facility of the Penitentiary.

== Legal process ==
When the prosecution seeks the death penalty, the sentence is decided by the jury and must be unanimous.

In case of a hung jury during the penalty phase of the trial, a life sentence is issued, even if only a single juror opposed death (there is no retrial).

Only the Governor of Wyoming may grant commutation of a death sentence. Since 1977, no commutation has been granted.

Death row for men is located at the Wyoming State Penitentiary in Rawlins, and the location for women is at the Wyoming Women's Center in Lusk.

The method of execution is lethal injection. Gas inhalation is provided as the backup method should lethal injection ever be found unconstitutional.

Wyoming is the only state that does not allow news reporters to be execution witnesses, allowing only people authorized by the condemned. Mark Hopkinson did not authorize any to his execution in 1992, so there were no witnesses at all.

== Capital crimes ==
First degree-murder is punishable by death if it involves one of the following aggravating factors:

1. The murder was committed by a person confined in a jail or correctional facility, on parole or on probation for a felony, after escaping detention or incarceration, or released on bail pending appeal of his conviction.
2. The defendant was previously convicted of another murder in the first degree or a felony involving the use or threat of violence to the person.
3. The defendant knowingly created a great risk of death to two or more persons.
4. The murder was committed while the defendant was engaged, or was an accomplice, in the commission of, or an attempt to commit, or flight after committing or attempting to commit, any aircraft piracy or the unlawful throwing, placing or discharging of a destructive device or bomb.
5. The murder was committed for the purpose of avoiding or preventing a lawful arrest or effecting an escape from custody.
6. The murder was committed for compensation, the collection of insurance benefits or other similar pecuniary gain.
7. The murder was especially atrocious or cruel, being unnecessarily torturous to the victim.
8. The murder of a judicial officer, former judicial officer, district attorney, former district attorney, defending attorney, peace officer, juror or witness, during or because of the exercise of his official duty or because of the victim's former or present official status.
9. The defendant knew or reasonably should have known the victim was less than 17 years of age or older than 65 years of age.
10. The defendant knew or reasonably should have known the victim was especially vulnerable due to significant mental or physical disability.
11. The defendant poses a substantial and continuing threat of future danger or is likely to commit continued acts of criminal violence.

== See also ==
- List of people executed in Wyoming
- List of death row inmates in the United States § Wyoming
- Crime in Wyoming
