= Albany County Sheriff's Office (Wyoming) =

Agency overview
- Preceding agency: Municipal Police
- Employees: 54

Jurisdictional structure
- Operations jurisdiction: Albany County, Wyoming, U.S.
- Population: 38950
- General nature: Local civilian police

Operational structure
- Sworn members: 46
- Agency executive: Aaron Appelhans, Sheriff

Website
- Albany County Sheriff's Office

The Albany County Sheriff's Office is a local police agency in Albany County, Wyoming, United States. It consists of 46 sworn law enforcement officers and 8 civilian support personnel. As of 2022, the sheriff is Aaron Appelhans, the first African-American to serve as sheriff in Wyoming.

== Controversy ==
In 2021, the New York Times described the department as "troubled" and plagued by "allegations of nepotism, selective enforcement and excessive force".

In 2018, an unarmed man, Robbie Ramirez, was shot and killed by deputy Derek Colling. This was the third time in Colling's career that he had shot and killed someone. The George Floyd protests in Laramie in partnership with a grassroots organization Albany County for Proper Policing (ACOPP), called attention to Collin's 2018 killing of Ramirez. Colling resigned in 2021. Ultimately, Ramirez's family successfully sued Colling for wrongful death. Sheriff Dave O’Malley resigned in 2020 amid a lawsuit over the shooting.

== Reform ==
After O'Malley's resignation, Appelhans was appointed his replacement. State Representative Cyrus Western replied to a post on Twitter about Appelhans's appointment with an animated GIF from the film Blazing Saddles; after receiving criticism for the tweet, Western deleted the tweet, issued a public apology, and called Appelhans to apologize. Appelhans spoke of his goal of diversifying the department, of which he was the only Black officer at the time. In 2021, Appelhans fired a deputy who was accused of harassing a Black subordinate until the subordinate quit.

== Rank structure ==
Title	Insignia
Sheriff	
Undersheriff	
Sergeant	
Corporal	
Deputy

== See also ==
- List of law enforcement agencies in Wyoming
- Matthew Shepard, to whose beating the Albany County Sheriff's Office responded
