= Proxy murder =

Murder committed indirectly

A proxy murder is a murder that is committed indirectly, most likely by one person ordering another person, or through the use of a third party.

== Hit men ==
A common example of a proxy murder would be a person contracting a hired killer, often termed a "hit man". Hit men commit the act of murder on a specific target or targets, and may receive payment in exchange for the murder or murders committed. This is what is known as contract killing. Hit men are most often associated with organized crime, e.g. mafias and street gangs.

== Honor killing ==
Honor killing is a type of murder when a person kills a member of their family for tarnishing the family image. Usually the victim is a woman who has violated sexual norms, such as refusing an arranged marriage or having relationships with unapproved, unrelated people. It is often a proxy murder, in which the order to kill is given out by the head of the family, usually the father, instructing a brother to kill his sister. In some very rare cases, hit men have been hired to perform the honor killings.

== Famous cases ==
=== John Bodkin Adams ===
A famous case involving proxy murder was that of John Bodkin Adams. John Bodkin Adams was an Irish physician who was investigated from 1946 to 1952 when 152 of his patients died mysteriously. Out of the 152, 130 of them mentioned Adams in their will, leaving him various amounts of money and items. Adams was accused of having his assisting nurses give lethal doses of opiates. Adams was arrested and tried for several counts of murder. He admitted to helping his nurses deliver morphine to patients, but he said it was to ease their passing, not to kill them. Adams was acquitted for several of the murders, and many others were withdrawn because the cases were not strong enough to hold up in court. In the end, Adams was convicted of fraud for lying on cremation papers.

=== Charles Manson ===
The person instigating a proxy murder may or may not be legally guilty of the crime of murder. This legal distinction varies where in the world the murder takes place. The person who instigated the murder is usually guilty as well. They may be charged with murder, conspiracy to commit murder, or being an accessory to murder. An example of this is Charles Manson and the Tate–LaBianca murders. Manson was the leader of the Manson Family cult that resided in California in the late 1960s. In 1969, some members of the Manson Family committed seven murders across a five-week span. One of the more notable people murdered was actress Sharon Tate. Charles Manson did not commit any of the murders himself, but instructed the members of the Manson family to commit them. In 1971, Manson was convicted on the charge of conspiracy to commit murder. The court ruled that Manson had as much guilt tied to him with that of his followers. Manson was sentenced to death initially, while later commuted to 9 concurrent life sentences at the Corcoran State Prison in California.

=== Mark Hopkinson ===
A notorious case of proxy murder was that of Mark Hopkinson, who ordered the bombing deaths of an attorney and his family in 1977 in Evanston, Wyoming. That bombing killed attorney Vincent Vehar, his wife, and one of his sons. While in prison awaiting trial for the Vehar murders, Hopkinson ordered the torture-murder of one of his employees, Jeff Green, who was about to testify against Hopkinson in court. The man who bombed the Vehar house received a twenty-year sentence, but the hitmen who murdered Jeff Green have never been found. Hopkinson was nevertheless convicted of ordering all four murders and was executed by lethal injection in 1992.
