= Wyoming State Penitentiary =

Prison and historic site in Wyoming, United States

Coordinates: 41°45′56″N 107°12′56″W

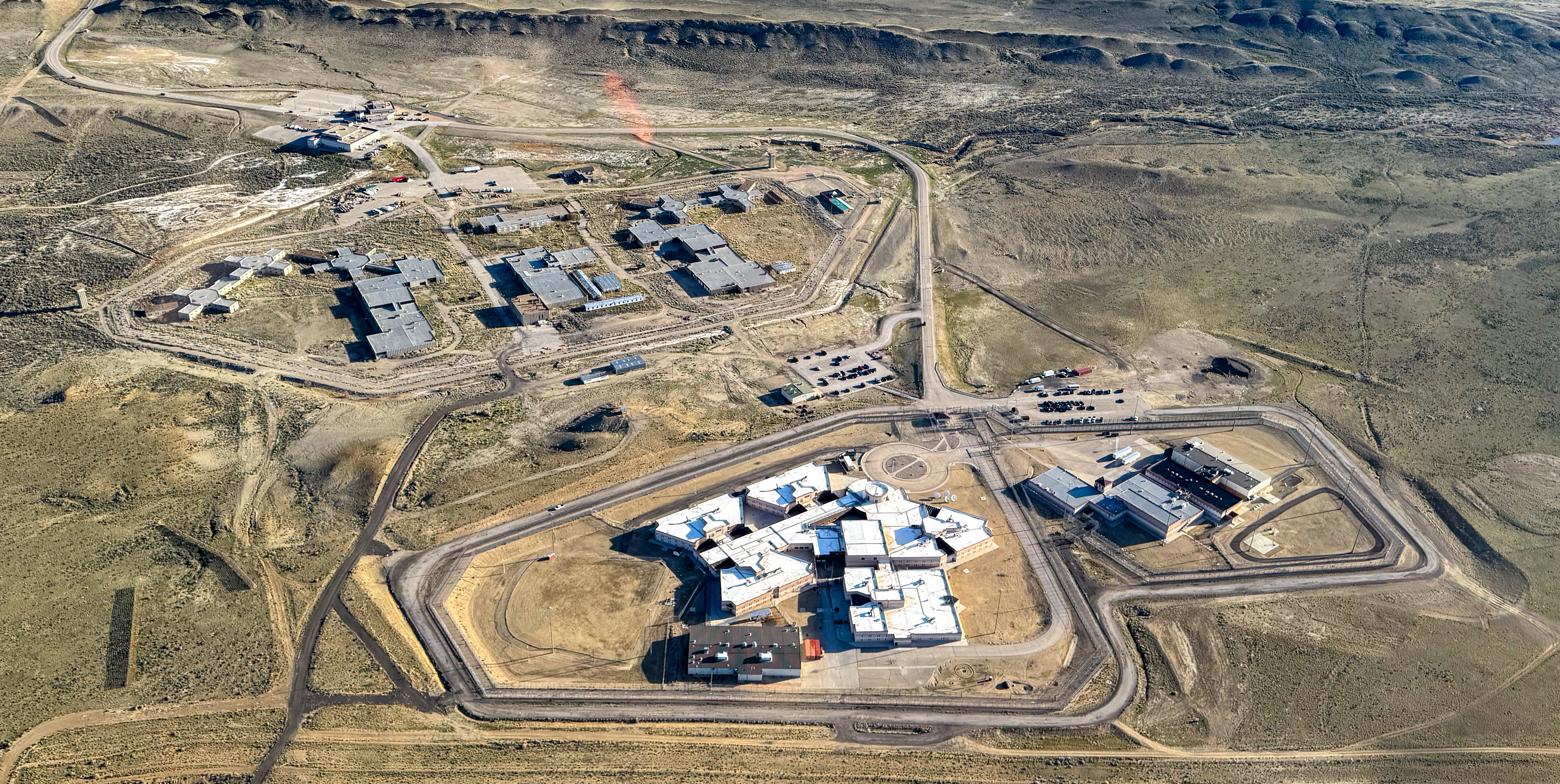
- Interactive map of Wyoming State Penitentiary
- Location: 2900 S Higley Blvd, Rawlins, Wyoming
- Status: In Use
- Security class: Level IV/Level V Maximum Security
- Capacity: 750 inmates
- Opened: Frontier Prison: 1901; North Facility: 1980; Current Facility: 2001
- Closed: Frontier Prison: 1980; North Facility: 2001
- Managed by: Wyoming Department of Corrections
- Director: Shawn Hobson, Warden

The Wyoming State Penitentiary is an American historic and current prison in Rawlins, Carbon County, Wyoming, which has operated from 1901. It moved within Rawlins to a new location in 1981. As of 2018, it is a Wyoming Department of Corrections state maximum-security prison for men.

Wyoming State Penitentiary is also the location of Wyoming's death row for men and execution chamber, which is located in the prison's parole board meeting room. No death sentences have been carried out in Wyoming since the 1992 execution of convicted murderer Mark Hopkinson, and, as of 2025, there are no inmates on death row.

== History ==
The penitentiary opened in Rawlins in 1901.

- Wyoming State Penitentiary District
- U.S. National Register of Historic Places
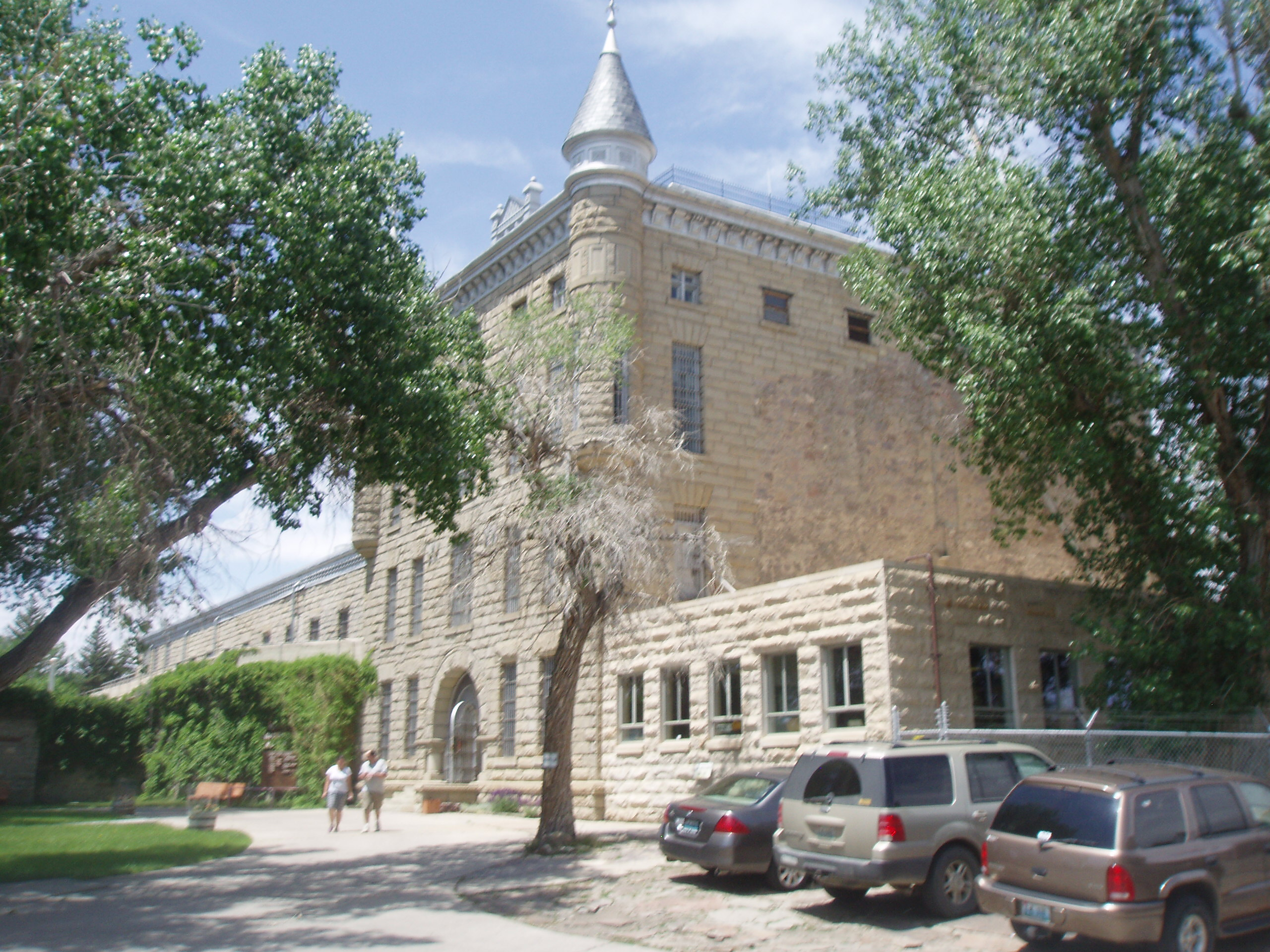
- The 1901 "Wyoming Frontier Prison" at 500 W. Walnut Street
- Location: 6th and Walnut Sts., Rawlins, Wyoming
- Area: 30 acres (12 ha)
- Built: 1894
- Architectural style: Mission/spanish Revival, Romanesque
- NRHP reference No.: 83003360
- Added to NRHP: May 26, 1983

Wyoming State Penitentiary District, at 6th and Walnut Streets in Rawlins, Wyoming, is a historic district that was listed on the National Register of Historic Places in 1983. The listing included 14 contributing buildings.

The listing included the original Administration Building, which is a large stone structure designed by Salt Lake City architect Walter E. Ware and built in stages during the 1890s. The design is generally Romanesque in style, including in its type of stonework and features such as a semicircular arch, vermiculated stone sills, short columns with foliated capitals, and cone-shaped roofs on its tower.

It was completed in 1901. The 1901 building is now a museum called the Wyoming Frontier Prison. Visitors can go on guided tours through the old prison. There are exhibits about the old and current prisons and the Wyoming Peace Officers' Museum.

In the summer of 1911, the Wyoming State Penitentiary All Stars baseball team played, made up of 12 inmates.

The Ware-designed prison operated for 80 years. Convict Henry Ruhl was executed there in 1945, the only person executed by the U.S. Federal Government in Wyoming. This facility closed as a prison in 1981 when replaced by the current location.

== Modern ==
Its current complex which opened in 1980 at first housed about 500 medium-security prisoners. The original portion of the complex, now called the North Facility, closed in 2001 as the newer South Facility opened. The South Facility boasts the third generation prison layout of 'pods.' A driving factor behind this was the faults with the star, or block, layout of the North Facility. Narrow halls and blind, sharp corners caused dangers to staff. Security issues of the old North Facility came to light when Corporal Wayne Martinez was killed by three inmates. The three inmates gained access to the control center Corporal Martinez was in, beating him with a fire extinguisher and stabbing him over thirty times. Two inmates involved in the attack were given life without the possibility of parole, while the third was sentenced to death. In memory of Corporal Martinez, the Wayne Martinez Training Center was given his name. The North Facility remains standing, but abandoned.

Prior to 1991 the Wyoming Board of Charities and Reform operated the prison. After, the Wyoming Department of Corrections operated it.

== Notable inmates ==
- William L. "Wild Bill" Carlisle - famous train robber, paroled in 1936
- Russell Henderson (later transferred to Wyoming Medium Correctional Institution) - murderer of Matthew Shepard
- Aaron McKinney - murderer of Matthew Shepard
- Mark Hopkinson - only person to be executed in Wyoming after capital punishment was reinstated
- Diazien Hossencofft - confessed murderer of Girly Chew Hossencofft
- James Wiley - murdered his step-mother, along with his three step-brothers.
- Anderson Lee Aldrich - perpetrator of Colorado Springs nightclub shooting, on November 19-20, 2022, in which five people were murdered and injured twenty-five others in the shooting. Later transferred to United States Penitentiary, Big Sandy in Inez, Kentucky.

== Previous Wyoming territorial and state prison ==
Wyoming's first state prison, built in 1872 near Laramie, Wyoming, and decommissioned in 1901, is now the Wyoming Territorial Prison State Historic Site. It operated as a federal penitentiary from 1872 to 1890, and as a state prison from 1890 to 1901.
