= Sarah Farahat =

Egyptian-American artist and educator

Sarah Farahat سارة فرحات is an transdisciplinary Egyptian-American artist and educator based in Portland, Oregon. She created the We Choose Love mural at the TriMet transit centre that was the site of the 2017 Portland train attack.

== Education ==
Sarah Farahat received a B.A. in Psychology from Occidental College in Los Angeles, California in 2001 and a B.F.A. in Intermedia Studies from Pacific Northwest College of Art in 2008. In 2016 she received an M.F.A. in Interdisciplinary Fine Art from California College of the Arts in San Francisco, California. She teaches youth and is an adjunct professor at the Pacific Northwest College of Art.

== Career ==
In 2011, Farahat was selected for Ashkal Alwan's Home Workspace program in Beirut, Lebanon in 2011 and produced the publication Beirut Journal for Radical Activation. Her performance in the Home Workspace program was described by Artforum critic Kaelen Wilson-Goldie as "disarmingly sincere, unabashedly feminist, and deceptive in its simplicity."

In 2016, Farahat contributed to the international conference and artist project Open Engagement. Also that year, she self-published A Third for Luck, a speculative fiction set in Cairo in the year 2055. A Third for Luck is in the permanent of the Arab American National Museum Library and the Pacific Northwest College of Art Charles Voorhies Library.

In 2017, Farahat was chosen to lead a team of artists to design a mural memorializing the 2017 Portland train attack. Farahat's design was selected by TriMet's tribute advisory committee from four finalists. The We Choose Love mural includes excerpts from the poem "Awakening" by Brooklyn, New York-based duo Climbing PoeTree that winds through the space, with each line written in a different language a western peony, and a quote from victim. The mural, which covers 2,000 feet of space, debuted in 2018 and is titled We Choose Love.

In 2018, one of Farahat's screenprint designs was selected for inclusion in the portfolio for the Poor People's Campaign: A National Call for Moral Revival. She also contributed a collection of plant studies to a group show at Pacific Northwest College of Art called Unwalking the West.

In 2020 Farahat joined the Justseeds' Artist Cooperative.

In 2023 Farahat worked with the City of Lake Oswego to create a mural based on community vision for the future of the city titled "Ms. Willie's Dream" named after community organizer and co-founder of Respond to Racism, Ms. Willie Poinsette. It will be located on the east side of City Hall for three years and then in the permanent collection of the Arts Council of Lake Oswego.
