= 2017 Portland train attack =

Stabbing attack in Oregon, U.S.

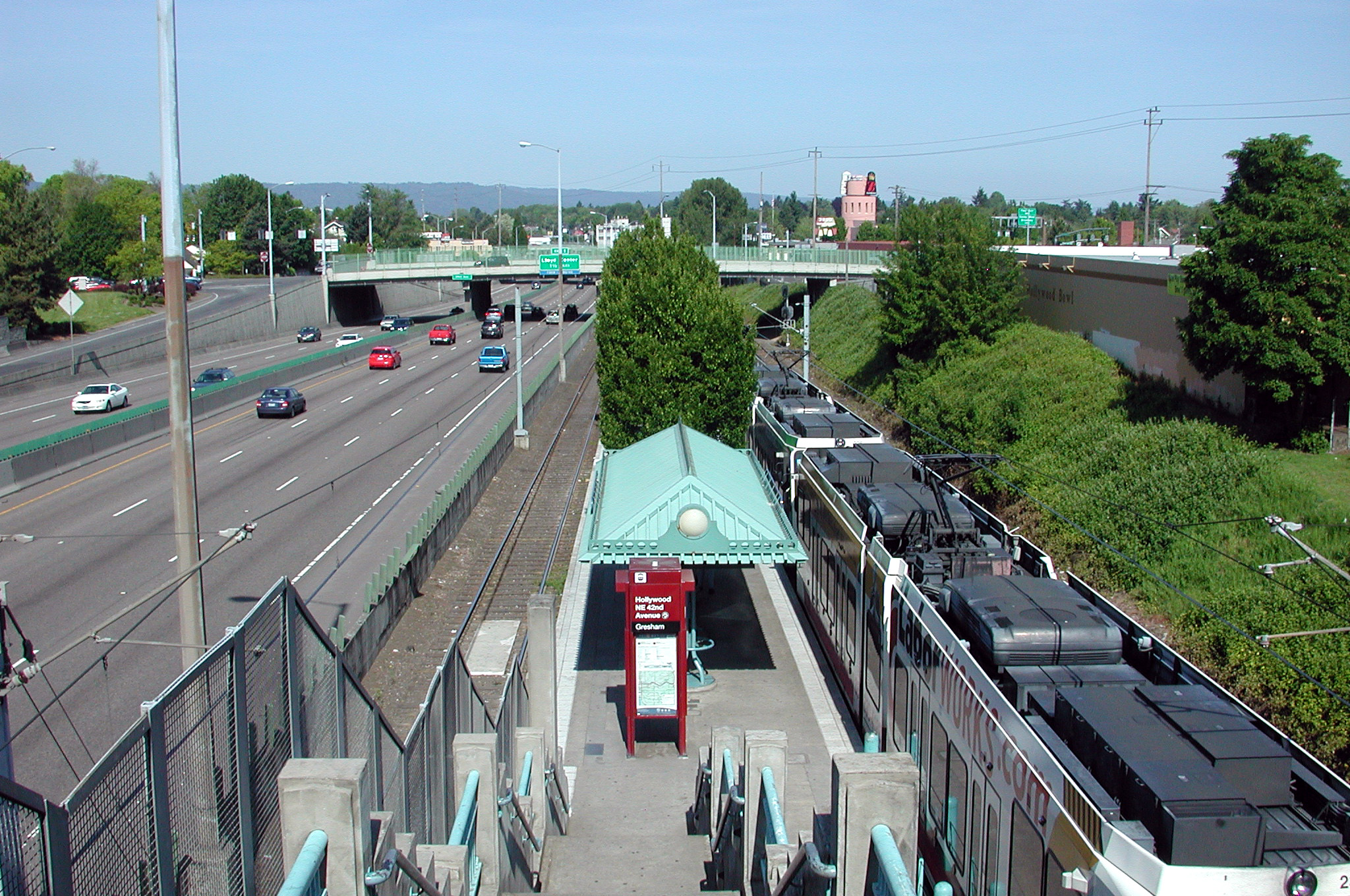
- The Hollywood/Northeast 42nd Avenue Transit Center MAX Station, where police arrived after the attack

- 2017 Portland train attack (Portland, Oregon) 2017 Portland train attack (Oregon) 2017 Portland train attack (the United States)
- Location: 45°31′58″N 122°37′15″W; Portland, Oregon, United States
- Date: May 26, 2017 c. 4:30 p.m. (UTC−08:00)
- Attack type: Stabbing, hate crime
- Weapon: Knife
- Deaths: 2
- Injuries: 1
- Perpetrator: Jeremy Joseph Christian
- Motive: Right-wing terrorism

On May 26, 2017, Jeremy Joseph Christian fatally stabbed two men and injured a third after he was confronted for shouting racist and anti-Muslim slurs at two black teenagers, Destinee Mangum and Walia Mohamed, on a MAX Light Rail train in Portland, Oregon, United States. Two of the victims, Ricky John Best of Happy Valley and Taliesin Myrddin Namkai-Meche of Portland, were killed; the third victim, Micah David-Cole Fletcher, survived with serious wounds.

Christian was arrested and indicted soon after the attack on charges of murder, attempted murder, and other crimes, including a separate hate-crime assault the day before the fatal attack. In February 2020, following a jury trial, Christian was found guilty on all counts. Christian was sentenced on June 24, 2020, to two life terms without parole. The attack was widely condemned by the Portland community, politicians, and civil rights groups, some of which said it represented a rise in hate speech, racism, and Islamophobic incidents in the United States.

== Attack ==
At about 4:30 p.m. PDT on May 26, 2017, Jeremy Joseph Christian fatally stabbed two people and injured a third on a MAX Light Rail train after he was confronted for directing what the Portland Police Bureau's report later said "would best be characterized as hate speech toward a variety of ethnicities and religions" at two girls. A witness reported that Christian used anti-Muslim slurs and "was screaming that he was a taxpayer, that colored people were ruining the city, and he had First Amendment rights". Portland police described Christian "as yelling and ranting and raving a lot of different things, including what we characterized as hate speech or biased language".

At the time, although not at its rush-hour peak, the train car was crowded, with all the seats filled and some passengers standing. As the man continued ranting, the train operator was heard on the loudspeaker, saying "Whoever is creating the disturbance needs to exit the train immediately." The man continued, however, directing his tirade at a 17-year-old Muslim Somali girl, who was wearing a hijab, and her non-Muslim friend, a black girl, age 16. The man told the girls to "go back to Saudi Arabia", to get out of "his country", and "said they were nothing and they should kill themselves". He also reportedly said that "Muslims should die."

Fearful, the pair moved to the back of the train as two bystanders, Taliesin Myrddin Namkai-Meche and Micah David-Cole Fletcher, stepped in to intervene in an attempt to de-escalate the situation. According to a witness, Namkai-Meche told Christian in an angry voice: "You need to get off this train. Please, get off this train." The witness said that the men attempted to form a barrier between Christian and the girls. Then Micah David-Cole Fletcher gave him "a slight push or shove" in an attempt to move him away. Christian fell backward and Fletcher pushed him again. Christian said: "Touch me again, and I'm going to kill you." Whereupon Fletcher immediately pushed him again. Namkai-Meche was filming with his phone. According to police, Christian then stabbed Ricky Best, who was nearby, and Namkai-Meche and Fletcher by slashing them with a knife. The stabbings happened within less than 12 seconds. At the Hollywood/Northeast 42nd Avenue Transit Center, passengers fled the car, as did Christian. He ran into the Hollywood neighborhood, chased by other passengers who had called 9-1-1.

After Fletcher was stabbed, a man rushed to him and rendered first aid. Three other men gave first aid to Best until EMS personnel arrived. Medics were unable to revive Best and he was declared dead at the scene; Namkai-Meche died later at a local hospital. The two girls also fled the train following the incident, leaving their belongings behind. After the attack, the station and MAX Light Rail trains were shut down in both directions for several hours.

Following their arrival at the station, police were able to locate Christian. A group of at least eight officers arrested him "on the north side of Providence Portland Medical Center on an access road running along Interstate 84, just east of 47th Avenue, at 4:48 p.m.". According to a police affidavit filed subsequently in court, during the arrest Christian threw a folding knife with a 3.75-inch (95 mm) blade that hit a police car and bounced off of it. The police affidavit also states that patrol car video footage shows Christian saying after his arrest, "I just stabbed a bunch of motherfuckers in the neck ... I can die in prison a happy man", and about one of the men on the train who had confronted him, he said, "That's what liberalism gets you."

== Investigation ==
Christian was booked into the Multnomah County jail. The FBI assisted Portland police in the investigation. Renn Cannon, of the Portland FBI field office, said at the time, "It's too early to say whether last night's violence was an act of domestic terrorism or a federal hate crime."

== Theft from a victim ==
In the early morning of June 2, 2017, police arrested 51-year-old George Elwood Tschaggeny, who lived in a small homeless camp near the platform where the train stopped after the attack. According to police and prosecutors, Tschaggeny removed the wedding band from Best's finger and stole Best's backpack and wallet. He was arrested after police viewed surveillance video showing the theft and obtained a community tip on the thief's identity. According to police, he was wearing Best's ring when he was arrested and had the backpack and contents of Best's wallet. Tschaggeny was a heroin addict. He was arraigned on charges of identity theft, second-degree abuse of a corpse, first-degree theft and tampering with physical evidence. After a guilty plea on November 14, 2017, he was sentenced to 13 months in jail followed by five years of probation and court-supervised drug treatment.

== Prosecution of Jeremy Joseph Christian ==
=== Indictment and pretrial proceedings ===
Christian was charged with two counts of aggravated murder and one count of attempted murder, as well as three misdemeanors: two counts of second-degree intimidation and one count of being a felon possessing a restricted weapon. At his arraignment on May 30, 2017, Christian began yelling a variety of slogans as soon as he entered the courtroom, shouting: "Get out if you don't like free speech. You call it terrorism, I call it patriotism. You hear me? Die." He also yelled: "Leave this country if you hate our freedom—death to antifa!"

On June 6 the Multnomah County grand jury indicted Christian on 15 counts. Of these, 11 related to the May 26 stabbings (two counts of aggravated murder, one count of attempted aggravated murder, one count of first-degree assault, one count of second-degree assault, five counts of unlawful use of a weapon, three counts of second-degree intimidation and two counts of menacing) and four related to conduct the day before the stabbing, when Christian threw a plastic bottle at a black woman at the Interstate/Rose Quarter MAX Station. Another outburst occurred at a brief, 85-second court appearance on June 7. Christian shouted that he was not guilty and that he acted in self-defense against the "violent aggression by Micah Fletcher". Christian pleaded not guilty to all charges.

A Portland television station sought the release of warrants and affidavits related to the investigation; in October 2017, a federal judge denied the motion due to concerns that the release could prejudice potential jurors. In November 2017, a bail hearing was held; Christian was denied bail.

On November 1, 2019, pursuant to a new state law, Christian's aggravated murder charges were downgraded to first-degree murder, eliminating the possibility of the death penalty.

=== Trial, conviction, sentencing, and appeal ===
The trial was initially scheduled to begin in June 2019 but was delayed for an additional six months to allow time for further pretrial proceedings. The judge denied Christian's request for a change of venue. Opening arguments for Christian's trial began January 28, 2020. In February 2019, Christian's attorneys filed a notice indicating that, at trial, the defense planned to raise mental health defenses. The defense team indicated that it might argue three such defenses: a "guilty except for insanity" defense, asserting that Christian was so mentally disturbed as to be incapable of forming criminal intent; a defense that Christian's mental illness made him only "partially responsible" for the offenses; and a defense that Christian was acting under extreme emotional disturbance.

At trial, prosecutors presented the testimony of 40 witnesses against Christian, including Micah Fletcher, who was wounded in the stabbing. A Portland homicide detective who interviewed Fletcher also testified and showed the jury the folding knife that was used. Cell phone videos and TriMet surveillance videos showing Christian stabbing the victims were introduced into evidence. Extensive video and audiorecordings of Christian's post-arrest rantings were also played to the jury. Christian did not testify in his own defense. The attorneys made their closing arguments on February 19; after 11 hours of deliberation over two days, on February 21 the jury announced they unanimously found Christian guilty on all counts. On June 24, 2020, Christian was sentenced to two consecutive life terms—one for each count of first-degree murder—with no possibility of parole. Christian was given an additional 51.5 years for related charges. During the sentencing hearing, Christian was removed from the courtroom after a furious outburst directed at one of his surviving victims.

Christian appealed his convictions, citing numerous alleged trial court errors. On June 17, 2024, the Oregon Court of Appeals rejected his arguments and affirmed Christian's convictions in full.

== Perpetrator's prior history ==
Jeremy Joseph Christian

Jeremy Joseph Christian had been convicted previously of kidnapping and the robbery of a convenience store in May 2002, and he was sentenced to 90 months in prison for that offense. During the robbery, he wore a ski mask, wielded a .38-caliber revolver, and handcuffed the store owner to a pole in the store; he was apprehended several blocks away from the store. Christian was also arrested in 2010 on charges of being a felon in possession of a firearm and theft, but those charges were later dropped. He held extremist views, posting neo-Nazi, antisemitic, and far-right material on social media, as well as material indicating an affinity for political violence. Christian described himself as a white nationalist. Despite this, a psychiatric report noted that many of his views diverged from what would be expected from a white supremacist and that he even expressed a desire to live amongst Brazil's Indigenous peoples. The Oregonian noted that Christian made many contradictory Facebook posts, but that such contradictions are typical of extremists. It said his posts "reveal a comic book collector with nebulous political affiliations who above all else seemed to hate circumcision and Hillary Clinton". At times he expressed support for Bernie Sanders and Donald Trump, although he wrote that he did not vote. According to friends and acquaintances, Christian's actions were becoming increasingly unstable, and he was in need of mental help, but he had not been given a formal diagnosis.

In April 2017, Christian wrote, "I just Challenged Ben Ferencz (Last Living Nuremberg Persecutor [sic]) to a Debate in the Hague with Putin as our judge. I will defend the Nazis and he will defend the AshkeNAZIs [a reference to European Jews]." He praised Timothy McVeigh in an online posting on April 19, the anniversary of the 1995 Oklahoma City bombing. He also "posted conspiracy theory memes from the right-wing Alex Jones Channel".

According to The Portland Mercury, Christian was a "known right-wing extremist and white supremacist". He had participated in various alt-right rallies in Portland. One month before the stabbing, Christian appeared at the right-wing March for Free Speech in Portland's Montavilla Park, which was organized by Patriot Prayer. He wore a Revolutionary War-era flag of the United States and carried a baseball bat, which police confiscated. He gave Nazi salutes and used a racial slur at least once. At the event, Christian was videotaped shouting "Die, Muslims!" The day before the killings, Christian had made racial threats on another train, threatened a conductor, and hurled a bottle at a black woman who then maced him, as seen on cell phone videos. Christian told police that he had dropped out of high school but later earned his high school equivalency and took classes at Portland Community College for a year. He identified himself to police as a transient who did "not know the last time he had a permanent address" and lived with friends and family.

== Victims ==
Ricky John Best, 53, of Happy Valley, died at the scene. He was a technician for the City of Portland's Bureau of Development Services, a U.S. Army veteran, and a father of four children. In 2012, he retired from the Army after more than twenty years of service.

Taliesin Myrddin Namkai-Meche, 23, of Ashland, died at a hospital shortly after the attack. He had recently graduated from Reed College with a degree in economics and worked for the Cadmus Group consulting firm. A passenger who helped him reported his last words: "Tell everyone on this train I love them."

Micah David-Cole Fletcher, 21, survived and was treated at Legacy Emanuel Medical Center for serious but not life-threatening wounds, specifically a knife injury to his throat. The attacker was millimeters away from hitting Micah's left jugular vein, while also narrowly missing his carotid artery. Fletcher was released from the hospital in time to attend Christian's arraignment on May 30, 2017. Fletcher, a student at Portland State University, won a poetry contest in 2013 while he was a junior in high school with a poem about Islamophobia in the United States.

Christian and Fletcher had both attended a "free speech" rally in Montavilla about a month prior to the attack. Christian was with a right-wing group, while Fletcher was a counter-protester.

Destinee Mangum, one of the two girls harassed by the assailant, expressed her gratitude to the three men who stepped in to help her.

== Reactions ==
=== Community ===
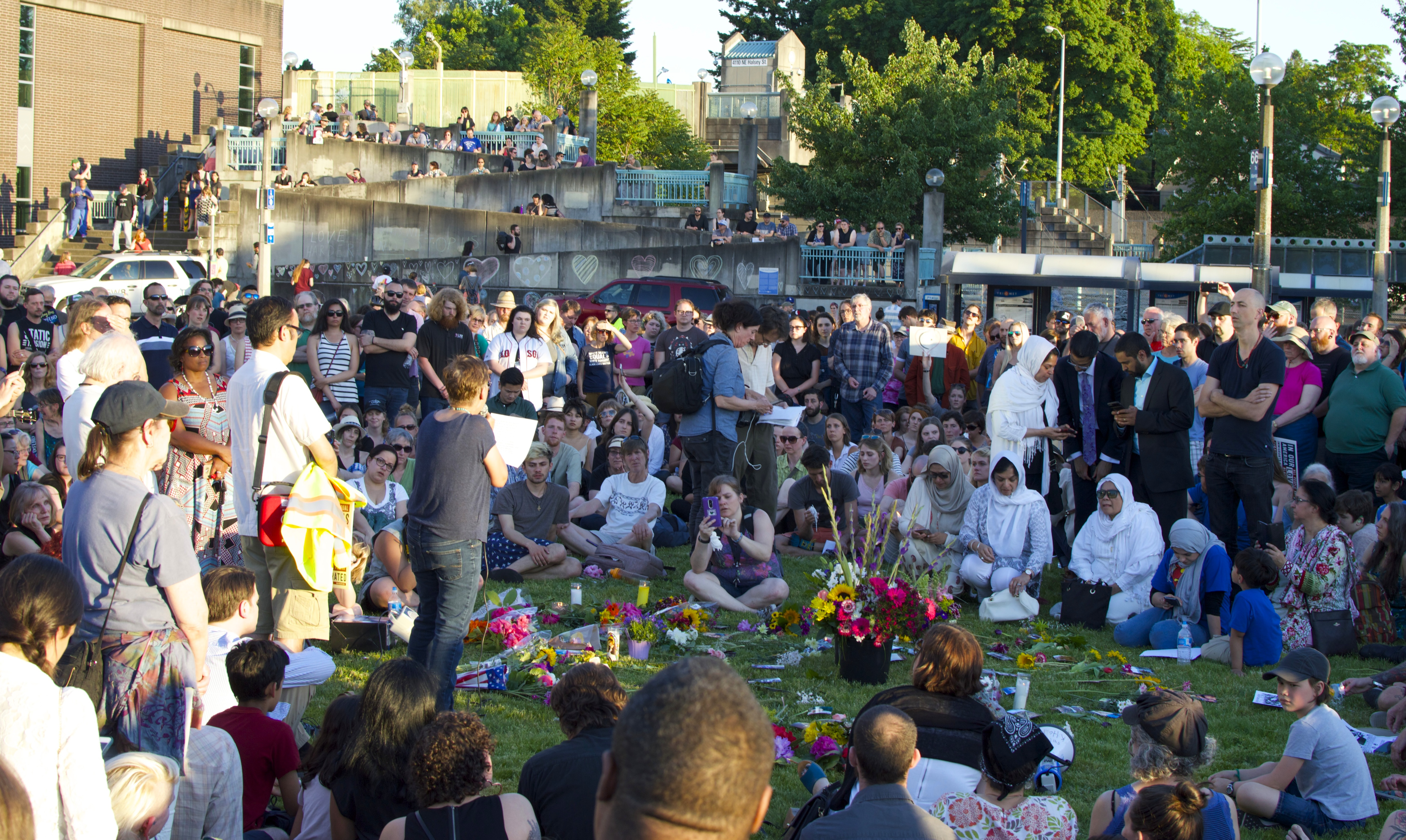
Vigil on May 27

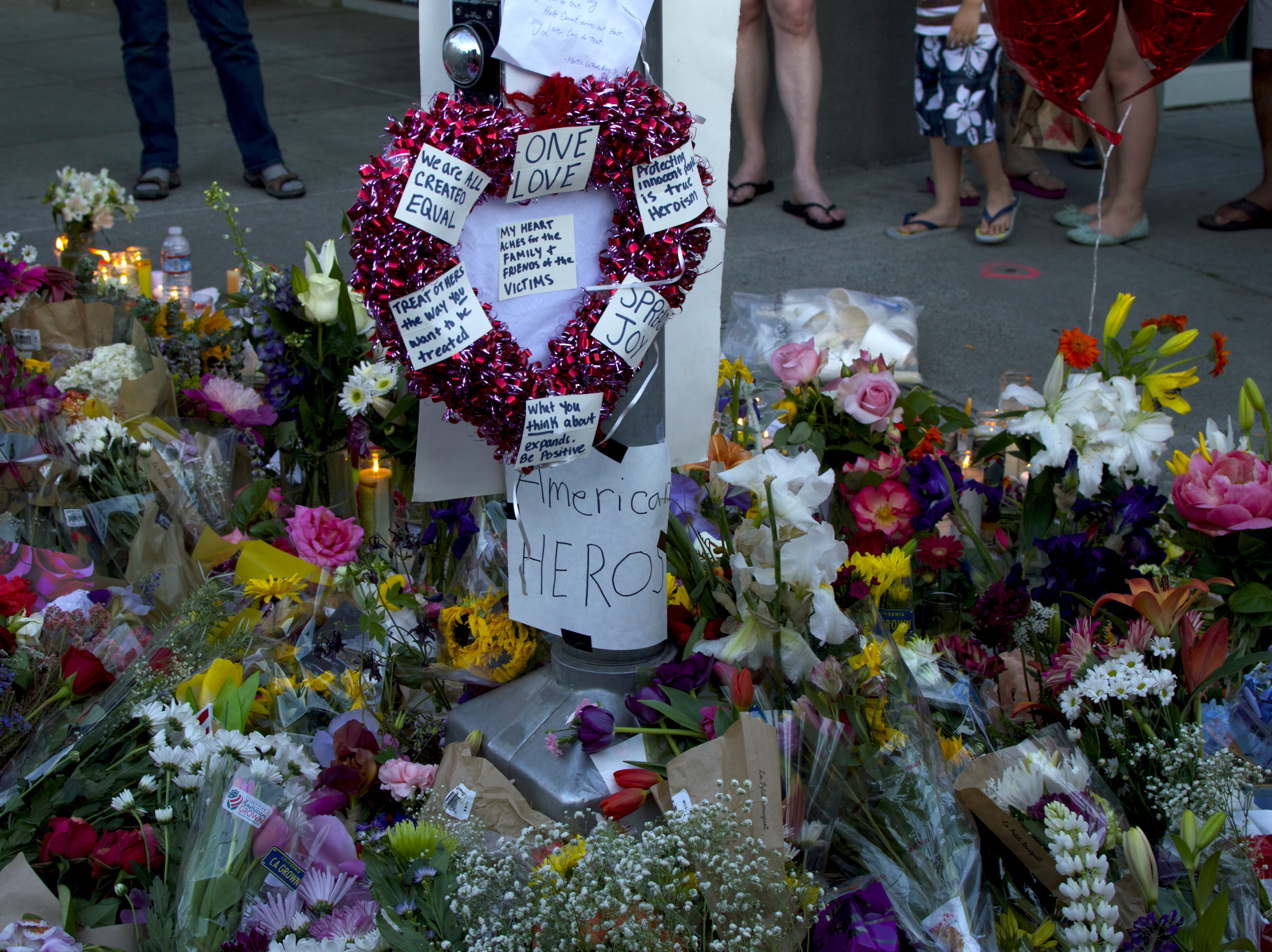
Memorial for victims at the Hollywood Transit Center

Hundreds of people gathered near the Hollywood Transit Center on the evening of May 27 for a candlelight vigil to honor the victims. Three crowdfunding campaigns set up to help the victims' families raised $1 million by May 29. Muslims in Portland said they were thankful for the support of the community after the attack. Wadji Said of the Interfaith Council of Portland compared the attack to the 1988 murder of Mulugeta Seraw, an Ethiopian immigrant who was slain by a group of racist skinheads in Portland.

=== Politicians and officials ===
Portland Mayor Ted Wheeler called the victims of the attack "heroes" in a statement released on May 27. He continued saying, "Their actions were brave and selfless, and should serve as an example and inspiration to us all." Governor of Oregon Kate Brown echoed this sentiment, calling on all Oregonians to come together: "Let's not let hate and fear divide us. Instead let's take the example of the good Samaritans who sacrificed their lives for the safety of others and unite for a kinder, gentler Oregon." In the wake of the stabbings, the mayor called on the federal government to withhold a permit for a "Trump Free Speech Rally" at Terry Schrunk Plaza, a federal enclave adjacent to city hall. The mayor said on Twitter that the rally "can only exacerbate an already difficult situation" in the city. He also called for withholding a permit for an ACT! for America rally at the same location. The ACLU of Oregon criticized the mayor's remarks. ACT! for America subsequently cancelled its planned anti-Muslim march in Portland, moving it to Seattle.

Former candidate for the 2016 presidential election Hillary Clinton called the incident "heartbreaking" and said that "No one should have to endure this racist abuse. No one should have to give their life to stop it." Oregon's U.S. Senators, Ron Wyden and Jeff Merkley, expressed their grief and condolences for the victims. Merkley urged President Trump to "speak out personally against the rising tide of Islamophobia and other forms of bigotry and racism in our nation that he has provoked through his numerous statements, policies and appointments". U.S. Representatives Suzanne Bonamici and Earl Blumenauer of Oregon, Oregon Attorney General Ellen Rosenblum, and other officials also gave their condolences. U.S. Representative Keith Ellison of Minnesota, the first Muslim elected to Congress, said that the three men "exhibited the best qualities of American heroes". President Trump delayed commenting on the stabbing attack, leading to public pressure on him to do so. Later, a message was posted on Trump's presidential Twitter account, stating "The violent attacks in Portland on Friday are unacceptable. The victims were standing up to hate and intolerance. Our prayers are w/ them." The Portland police contacted the Muslim community to discuss increased patrolling during Ramadan. The bureau's spokesperson said, "Our thoughts are with the Muslim community. As something like this happens, this only instills fear in that community."

=== Organizations ===
The Anti-Defamation League, in a statement by its CEO Jonathan Greenblatt, offered its condolences to the victims, praised the heroism of bystanders who intervened, and said: "The deadly attack in Portland is not a rare or isolated event. Rather, this is the latest in a long string of violent incidents connected to right-wing extremists in the United States... This consistent threat requires consistent resources and we call on our leaders to condemn this brutal act of terror and craft policy to counter all forms of violent extremism, including white supremacy."

The Council on American–Islamic Relations asked President Trump to denounce "rising bigotry" and violence against Muslims. The organization's executive director said, "President Trump must speak out personally against the rising tide of Islamophobia and other forms of bigotry and racism in our nation that he has provoked through his numerous statements, policies and appointments that have negatively impacted minority communities." Imtiaz Khan, who serves as president of the Islamic Center of Portland, said: "We are very sad. Ramadan started just a couple of hours ago. We are very sorry for the two men who tried to do the right thing.... Of course people from the Muslim community are concerned. And, unfortunately, the easy targets are women because of the headscarf." Khan also praised the two men who were slain, saying they "really sacrificed everything. They really stood up for the values of the Constitution."

Harris Zafar with the Ahmadiyya Muslim Community in Portland said the actions of the men who stepped in to defend the Muslim women inspired him. The Asian Pacific American Network of Oregon expressed grief for the tragedy and hoped it would "draw Muslim communities together".

== See also ==
- Crime in Oregon
- List of homicides in Oregon
- 2016 Minneapolis shooting
- 2017 Olathe, Kansas shooting
- Murder of Carlos Palomino
- Murder of Timothy Caughman
- We Choose Love, a temporary memorial
