= Taihu stone =

Type of decorative rock

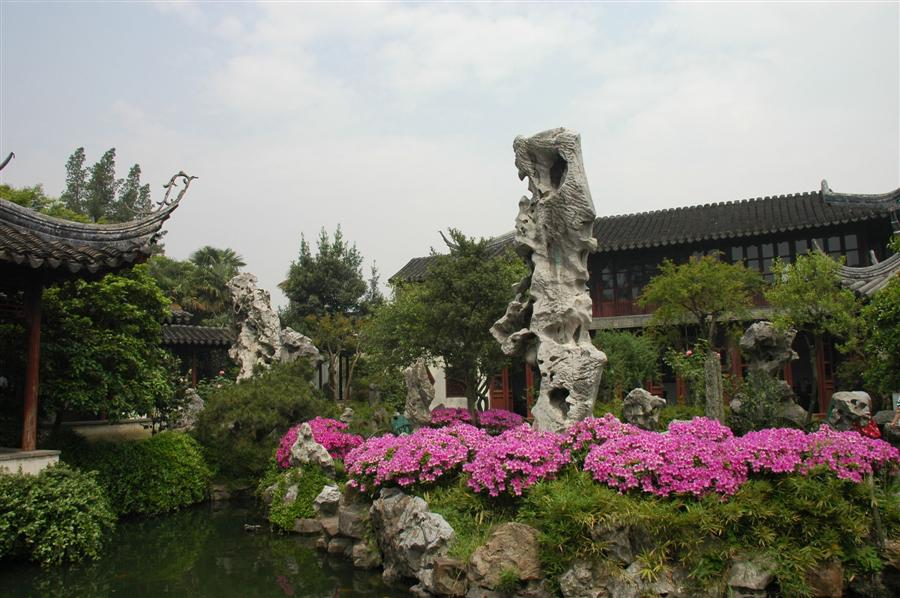
Guanyunfeng (冠云峰) in Lingering Garden

Taihu stone (Chinese: 太湖石) or porous stone is a kind of limestone produced at the foot of Dongting Mountain (洞庭山) in Suzhou, which is close to Lake Tai. Due to long-term surging by water, this kind of stone features pores and holes.

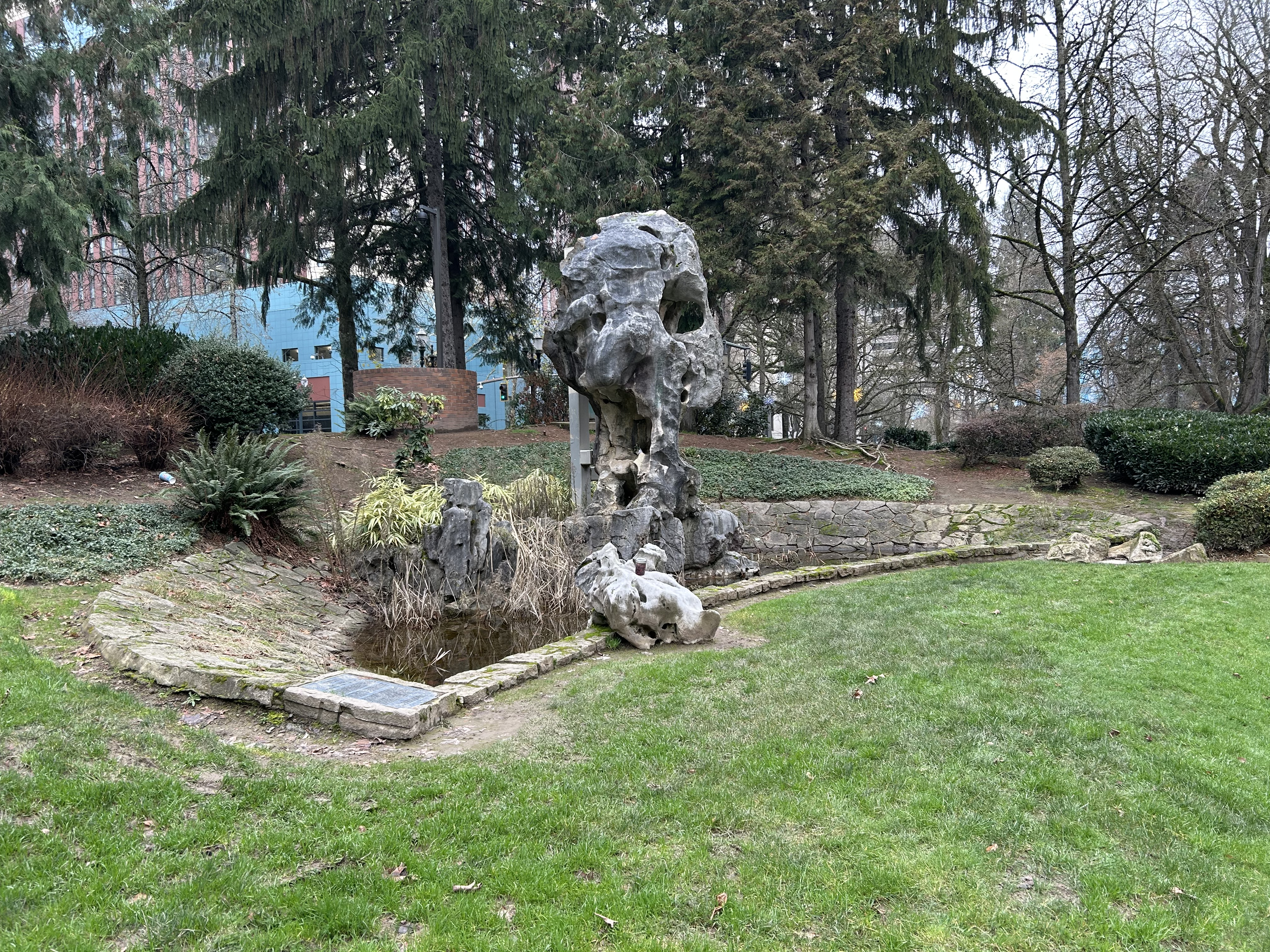
Taihu stones at Portland, Oregon's Terry Schrunk Plaza

These stones are very popular in gardening, following the concepts of traditional daoism and juxtaposition, themes very popular in that style of decoration.

== See also ==
- Gongshi – Chinese shaped rocks (natural or artistic)
