= River Legend =

Sculpture in Portland, Oregon

- The sculpture outside of the Edith Green – Wendell Wyatt Federal Building in 2015
- Artist: Dimitri Hadzi
- Completion date: May 1976
- Type: Sculpture
- Medium: Basalt
- Dimensions: 3.0 m × 0.91 m × 4.0 m (10 ft × 3 ft × 13 ft)
- Location: Portland, Oregon, United States; 45.51429°N 122.67752°W
- Owner: General Services Administration

River Legend is an outdoor 1976 basalt sculpture by American artist Dimitri Hadzi, located outside of the Edith Green – Wendell Wyatt Federal Building in Portland, Oregon.

== Description and history ==
River Legend, designed by American artist Dimitri Hadzi, is a basalt sculpture installed outside the Edith Green – Wendell Wyatt Federal Building in downtown Portland. It was commissioned for $65,000 in the 1970s by the General Services Administration's Art-in-Architecture Program and completed in September 1976. The allegorical sculpture ("rivers") measures 10 feet (3.0 m) x 3 feet (0.91 m) x 13 feet (4.0 m), according to the Smithsonian Institution, or approximately 2 feet (0.61 m) x 14 feet (4.3 m) x 14 feet (4.3 m), according to the General Services Administration. The 10,000-pound (4,500 kg) arch is made of Columbia Basin basalt and named after a natural crossing that spanned the Columbia River and allowed tribes to interact, according to Native American lore.

Hadzi has specifically referred to the former land bridge called Bridge of the Gods near Cascade Locks, and has also said the piece represents "man's power over nature and the taming of the wilderness". Originally, he intended to cast a bronze sculpture, but changed his mind after viewing natural geological formations along the Columbia River Gorge. The General Services Administration refers to the sculpture as a "monumental stone arch", while The Oregonian describes River Legend as a "street-level, dark-hued arch, made edgy by blond spiky protrusions around one segment".

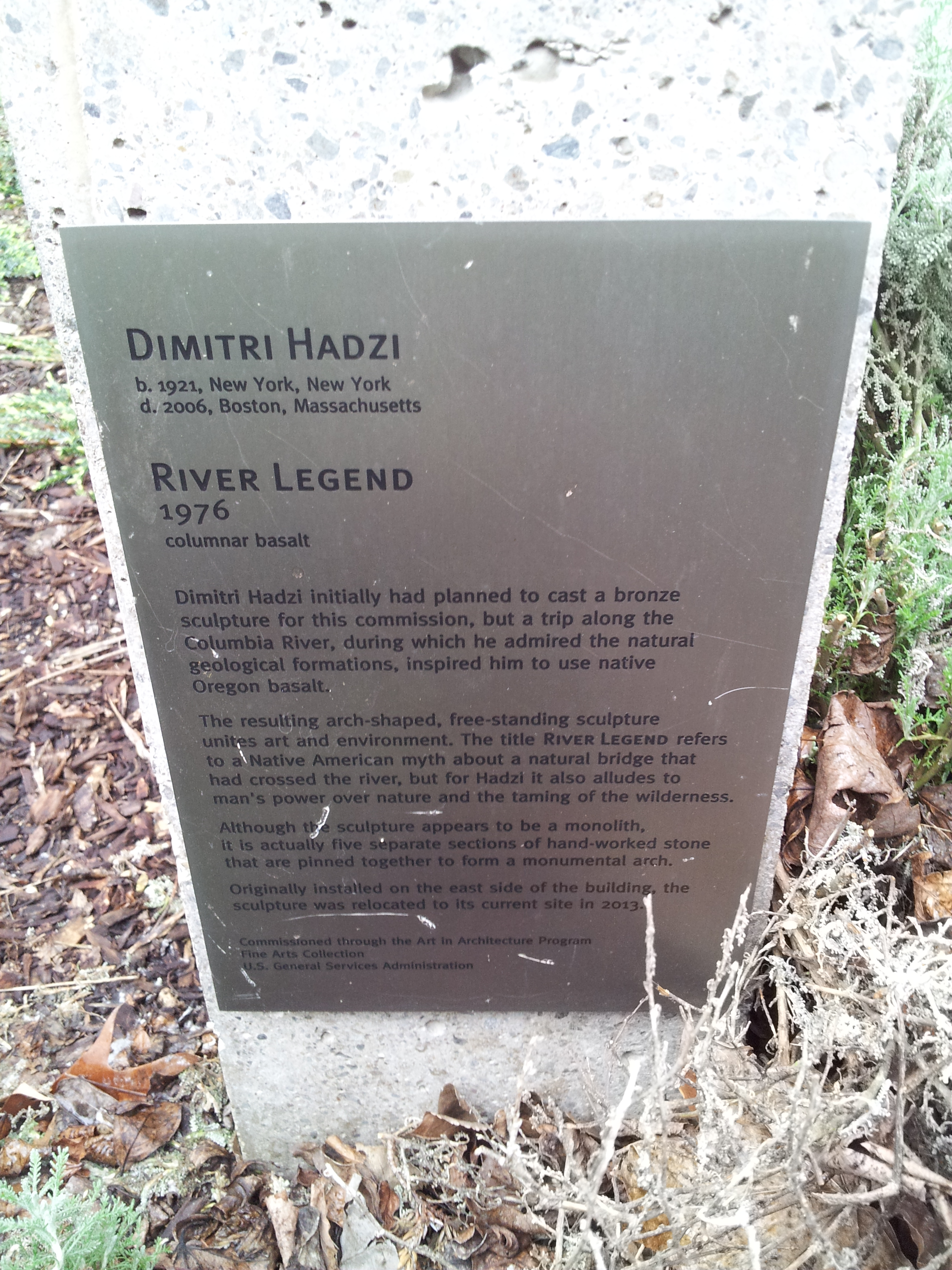
Plaque for the sculpture

Despite being publicly financed, the sculpture was initially hidden from general public view because the Edith Green – Wendell Wyatt Federal Building's original architect believed the arch competed with the building's design. It was installed on the building's plaza and was visible to occupants and visitors, but not from the street. Hadzi constructed a full-size cardboard replica to illustrate to the architect how it would look outside the building; according to Hadzi, the architect eventually realized "it was a mistake not to have [the sculpture] up front". The arch's five sections were originally built on-site by the artist. According to the General Services Administration, he "worked the surface of the stones with a variety of treatments and carefully pinned and fitted the sections together with minimal joinery".

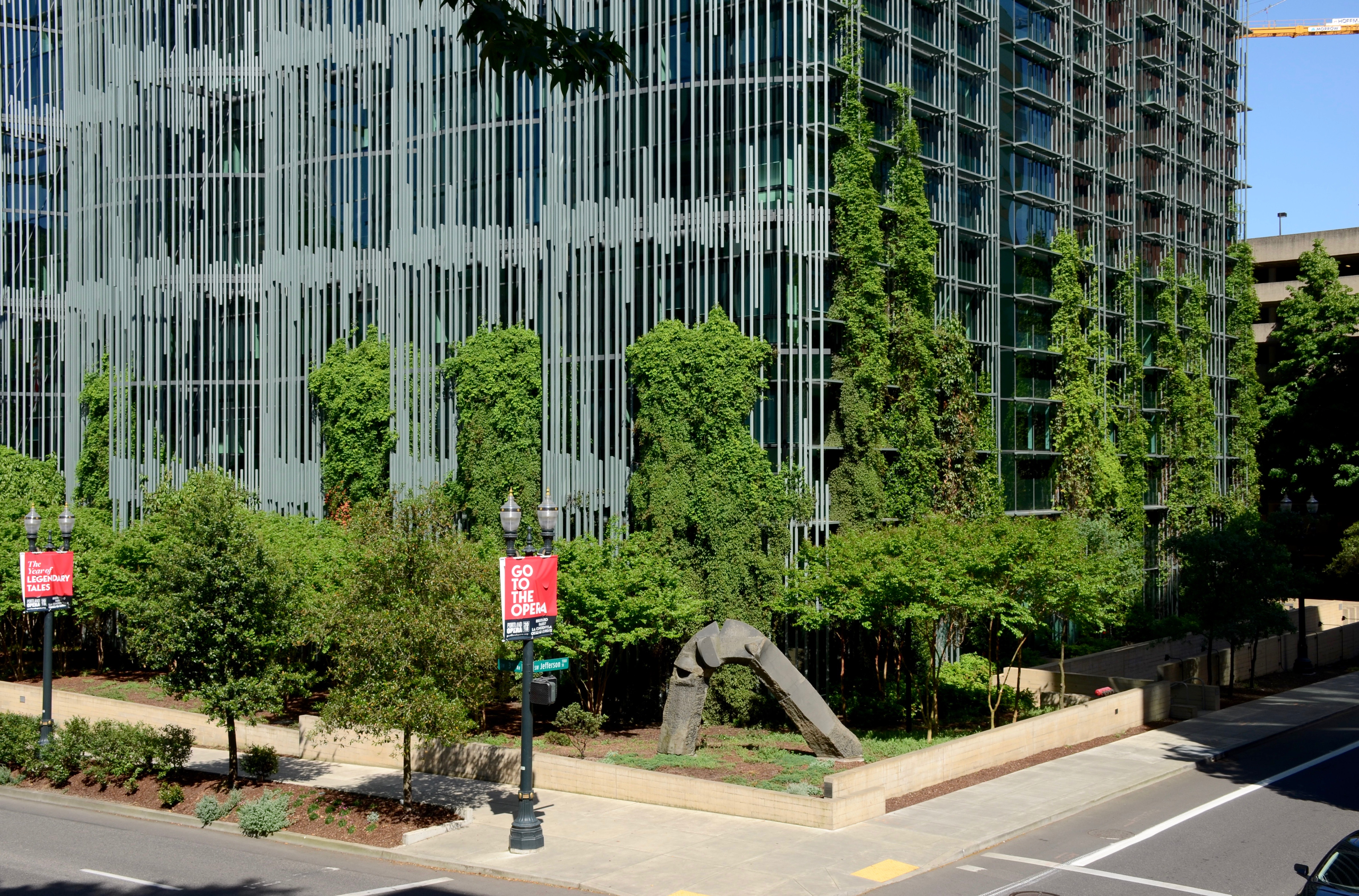
The sculpture in 2018

River Legend was relocated to the exterior in 2013 after the Edith Green – Wendell Wyatt Federal Building underwent a major renovation. According to the Smithsonian Institution, the work remains administered by General Services Administration's Art-in-Architecture Program.

Though not currently on display, the Smithsonian American Art Museum's collection includes a maquette of River Legend. The cast bronze maquette measures 11 1/8 x 15 x 7 in. (28.1 x 38.0 x 17.9 cm) and is set on a marble base.

== Reception ==
In his review for The Oregonian, Len Reed said the sculpture "seemed to offer relief, as if it were a jolt of reckless nature amid all the glass and concrete and metal. It seemed at once ancient and modern. It seemed to hold a secret." Furthermore, he said:

River Legend may be decades old, but its energy is all new and very, very public. Whether the pleasure it produces is encoded in cells or the result of some mysterious learning doesn't really matter. The ancient rock soars. That's true even if its nifty fins are wood shims to prevent a crack from expanding. Somehow amid moving, storing, and re-siting, a segment of the columnar basalt let go and requires an injection of epoxy to hold. It wouldn't be crazy to think of the sculpture for now as a songbird with a leg splint. Such a small price for a new life.

== See also ==
- 1976 in art
- Art in Architecture
