= 2017 Olathe shooting =

Hate crime in Olathe, Kansas, US

2017 Olathe, Kansas shooting
- 2017 Olathe shooting (Kansas) 2017 Olathe shooting (the United States)
- Location: 38°51′14″N 94°46′52″W; Austins Bar and Grill; Olathe, Kansas, US
- Date: February 22, 2017; 7:15 p.m (CST)
- Target: Indian immigrant workers
- Attack type: Shooting, hate crime, Domestic terrorism
- Weapon: Taurus PT111 chambered in 9x19 Parabellum
- Deaths: 1 (Srinivas Kuchibhotla)
- Injuries: 2 (Alok Madasani and Ian Grillot)
- Assailant: Adam Purinton
- Motive: Anti-Indian sentiment

On February 22, 2017, Adam Purinton shot two Indian men, Srinivas Kuchibhotla and Alok Madasani, whom he had allegedly mistaken for Iranians, at a restaurant in Olathe, Kansas, killing Kuchibhotla. He reportedly yelled "get out of my country" and "terrorist" before firing. A third man, Ian Grillot, was wounded after he came to the two men's aid. Several hours later, Purinton was arrested in Clinton, Missouri.

== Incident ==
According to witness accounts, the incident, at Austin's Bar and Grill at Mur-Len Shop on 151st St. and Mur-Len Rd., began as patrons were watching a basketball game; a man started yelling racial slurs at the victims, asking them whether their "status was legal". The man had been escorted from the premises after he was confronted by restaurant staff and other guests, but returned later with a gun and began firing. He reportedly told the two targeted victims—South Indian men who work for Garmin, a technology firm—to "get out of my country" before firing. Ian Grillot, a 24-year-old White American, was shot and suffered multiple bullet wounds as he came to the victims' aid.

The suspect, Adam Purinton, was arrested while drinking at a restaurant bar in Clinton, Missouri, about 82 miles (132 km) away. He had attracted the barman's attention by saying he needed a place to hide because he had just killed one Middle Eastern man and injured another.

== Perpetrator ==
Adam Purinton (born May 21, 1965), age 51, was arrested for the killing. After fleeing the bar, he was pursued by police in the Kansas City area who also went to his home. He eluded them, but was arrested after he was said to have admitted to "killing two Middle Eastern men" at a bar to which he had fled, 82 miles from the scene of the crimes. Purinton was said to have been a drinker whose alcohol consumption increased and whose behavior rapidly deteriorated after his father died from pancreatic cancer, 18 months before the crimes. Prior to his arrest, he had recently held a series of unskilled jobs including in hardware and liquor stores and as a dishwasher in a pizza parlor. He is a United States Navy veteran, had been an air traffic controller, and previously worked in information technology.

== Legal proceedings ==
Purinton was charged with one count of first-degree murder and two counts of attempted first-degree murder. He was held in the Johnson County jail, with his bond set at $2 million. He faced a maximum sentence of life in prison without the possibility of parole for 50 years. His preliminary hearing was initially scheduled for September 18; then postponed to January 2018. In November Purinton waived his right to a preliminary hearing and was arraigned on one count of first degree murder and two counts of attempted murder, initially entering a not guilty plea.

Purinton later pleaded guilty to the state charges of murder and attempted murder on March 6, 2018. He was sentenced to life imprisonment without the possibility for parole for the murder on May 4, 2018.

Purinton later pleaded guilty to federal hate-crime charges, thereby avoiding a death sentence, and received three consecutive life in prison sentences.

As of January 2024, Purinton is incarcerated at Hutchinson Correctional Facility in Hutchinson, Kansas.

== Reactions ==
Sushma Swaraj, India's Foreign minister, said on Twitter that "I am shocked", and that she would help the family to bring the victim's body back to Hyderabad.

Garmin later issued a public statement about the incident: "We’re saddened that two Garmin associates were involved in [the] incident, and we express our condolences to the family and friends of our co-workers involved. Garmin will have grievance counselors on-site and available for its associates today and tomorrow."

The families of victims have blamed the policies of U.S. President Donald Trump, for the incident. When asked by reporters whether "rhetoric that the President or—that generally has been out here recently could have contributed in any way", White House press secretary Sean Spicer stated, "I mean, obviously, any loss of life is tragic, but I'm not going to get into, like, that kind of—to suggest that there’s any correlation I think is a bit absurd. So I’m not going to go any further than that.

The incident was condemned by several American lawmakers and civil rights groups. US Senator Jerry Moran of Kansas posted a statement on Facebook about the shooting, expressing concern for the safety of other immigrants. Later President Trump, who condemned the attack at the beginning of his address to a joint session of Congress said that "Recent threats ( ... ), as well as last week's shooting in Kansas City, remind us that while we may be a nation divided on policies, we are a country that stands united in condemning hate and evil in all its forms".

Kansas Governor Sam Brownback signed a proclamation to honor the three victims of the shooting and declared March 16 as Indian American Appreciation day.

Members of India House Houston later raised $100,000 to honor the white American who came to the aid of the victims. He was also honored by the Asian Culture Association for heroism.

The victim Kuchibhotla's widow, Sunayana Dumala, faced deportation since her visa was tied to that of her husband's H-1B temporary highly skilled worker visa status. In January 2018, she received an H-1B temporary visa of her own.

== See also ==
- Anti-Middle Eastern sentiment
- Anti-Iranian sentiment
- Anti-Indian sentiment
- 2016 Minneapolis shooting
- 2017 Portland train attack
