= We Choose Love =

Memorial painting in Portland, Oregon, U.S.

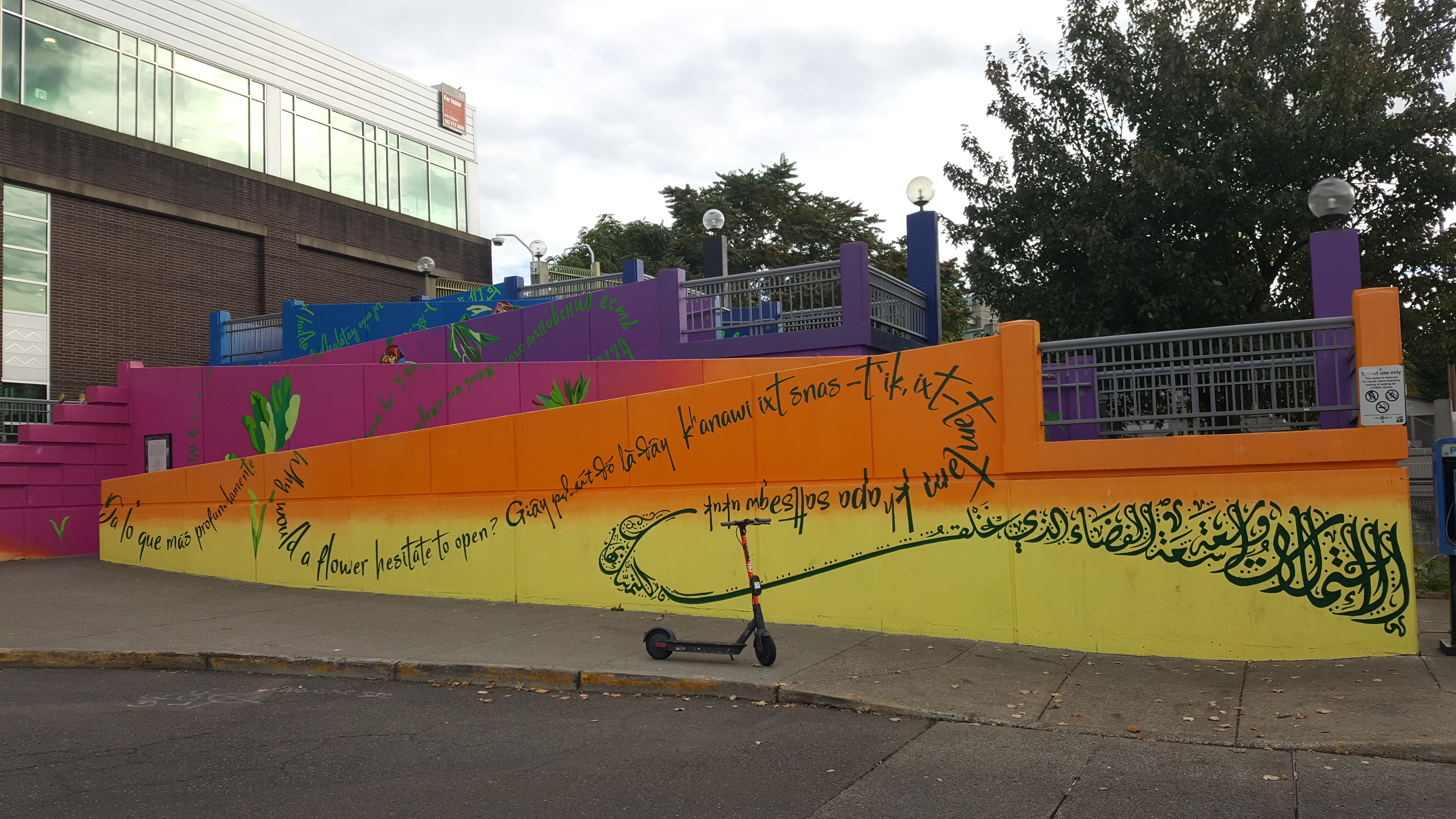
- The mural in 2021
- Artist: Sarah Farahat
- Location: Portland, Oregon, U.S.; 45°31′59.3″N 122°37′13.6″W

We Choose Love was a memorial to the 2017 Portland train attack, located at the Hollywood/Northeast 42nd Avenue Transit Center in Northeast Portland, Oregon. TriMet commissioned the memorial in the aftermath of the May 2017 attack, selecting a design by Sarah Farahat in a contest. We Choose Love was completed in May 2018, and was in place until January 2024.

== History ==
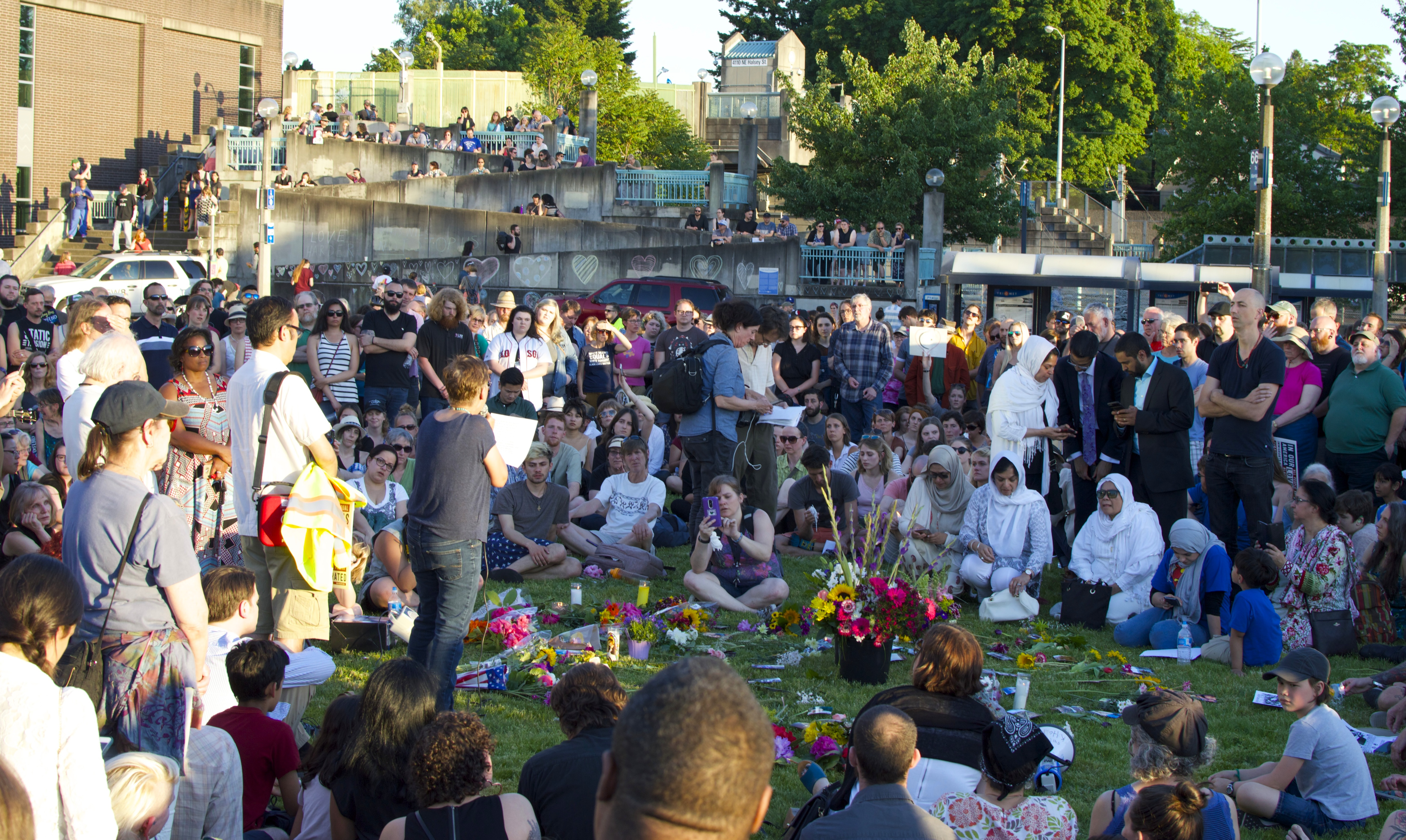
Vigil commemorating victims of the 2017 Portland train attack, showing chalk messages on the gray concrete ramp in the background

On November 9, 2017, TriMet asked artists to propose "text-based" designs for a mural commemorating Ricky Best and Taliesin Myrddin Namkai-Meche, who were killed in the 2017 Portland train attack. The mural was painted along the ramp walls of the Hollywood/Northeast 42nd Avenue Transit Center. Submissions were due by November 29, and artists were determined by December 5. Concepts were due in January 2018, and final design plans are to be confirmed in late February or early March. Work on the "Tribute Wall" began on April 20, and was scheduled to be completed by May 12, 2018.

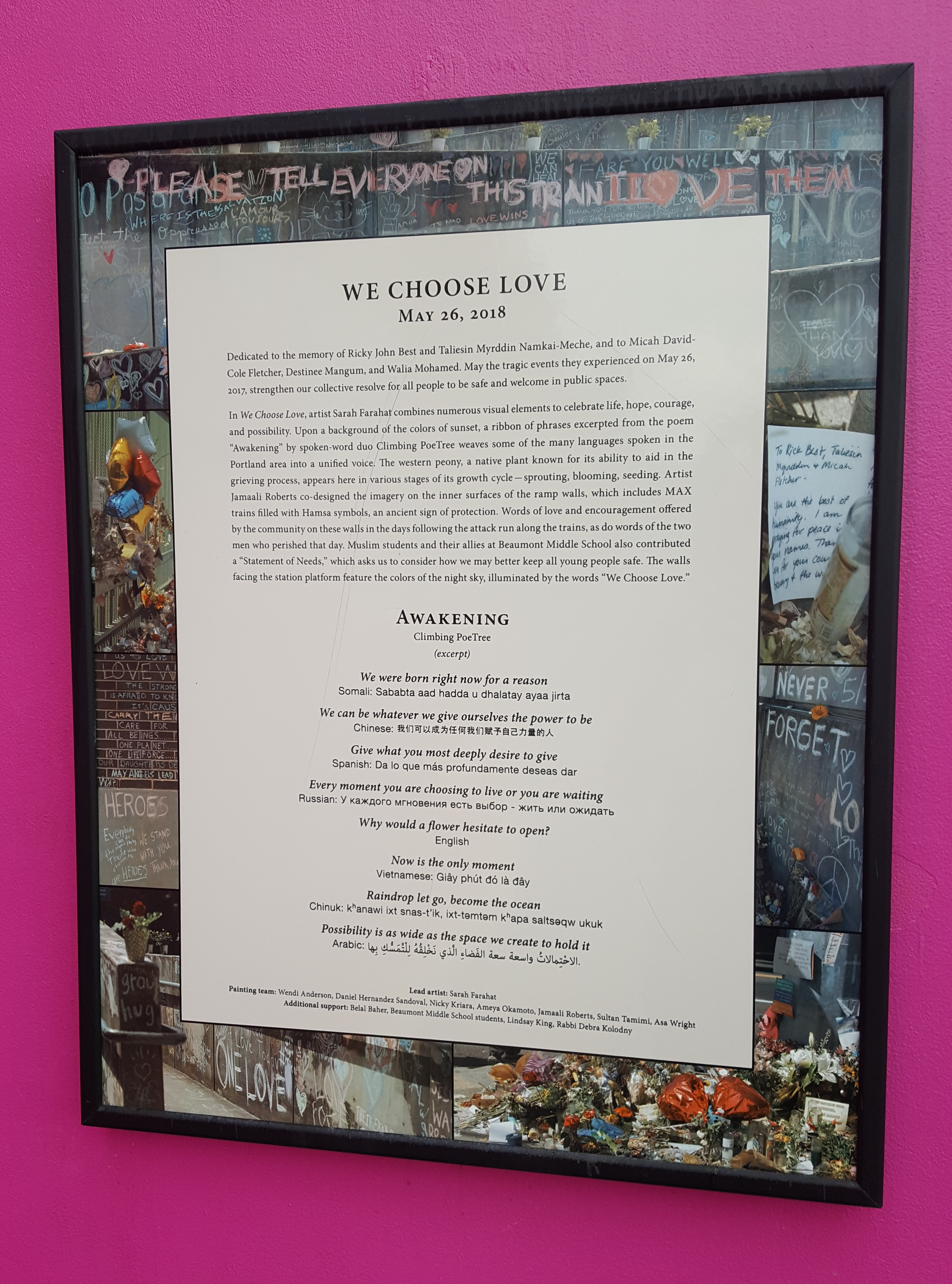
Text about the mural on display

Sarah Farahat's design was selected by TriMet's tribute advisory committee from four finalists, all of whom drew inspiration from chalk messages left by people following the attack. Farahat's design includes sunflowers and an excerpt from Palestinian poet Mahmoud Darwish's poem, "Mural". TriMet has confirmed plans to unveil a plaque on May 26, the anniversary of the attack. Farahat's design, We Choose Love, was completed in summer 2018. John Laursen was commissioned to create the plaque, which will be made of porcelain enamel and steel, and feature both images and text. In addition to Best and Namkai-Meche, the plaque will commemorate three other victims from the attack.

According to TriMet, the memorial honors Best and Namkai-Meche, "as well as recognize the courage of those who were targeted by and stood up to hatred and violence".

== See also ==
- 2018 in art
- Culture of Portland, Oregon
