= Edith Green – Wendell Wyatt Federal Building =

Building in Portland, Oregon, U.S.

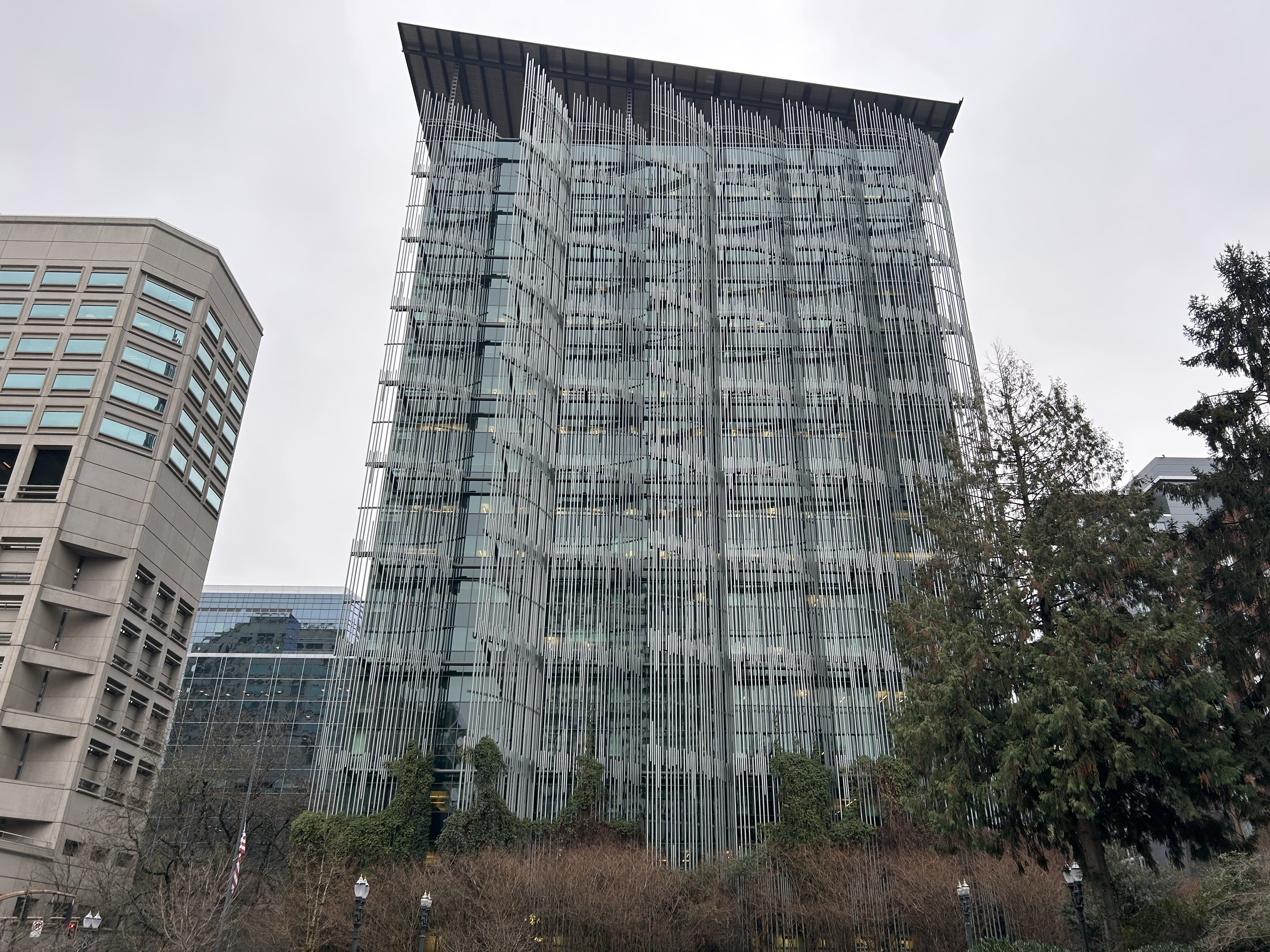
- Front of the building from the west in 2025

- Location within Portland, Oregon

General information
- Type: Office
- Location: Portland, Oregon, United States
- Coordinates: 45.5144°N 122.6770°W
- Completed: 1970s
- Opening: 1975
- Operator: General Services Administration

Height
- Roof: 270 feet (82 m)

Technical details
- Floor count: 18
- Floor area: 372,461 square feet (34,602.8 m^{2})

Design and construction
- Architect: Skidmore, Owings and Merrill
- Main contractor: Hoffman Construction Company

The Edith Green – Wendell Wyatt Federal Building is a high rise structure in downtown Portland, Oregon, United States. Opened in 1975, the 18 story-tower is owned by the federal government. The international style office building has more than 370,000 square feet (34,000 m^{2}) of space. Designed by the Skidmore, Owings and Merrill architecture firm, the building is named after Wendell Wyatt and Edith Green who both served in the United States House of Representatives.

== History ==
The Green – Wyatt building was constructed in the 1970s by Hoffman Construction Company under a $20 million contract. The new building opened in 1975. On June 21, 1989, an arson fire in the lobby caused $300,000 in damages, mostly from the sprinkler system that kept the night-time fire contained to the lobby area. Firefighters returned in February of the next year when a person trapped in an elevator inadvertently set off the fire alarm. Also that year, the U.S. and Foreign Commercial Service moved out of the building and into Oregon's World Trade Center.

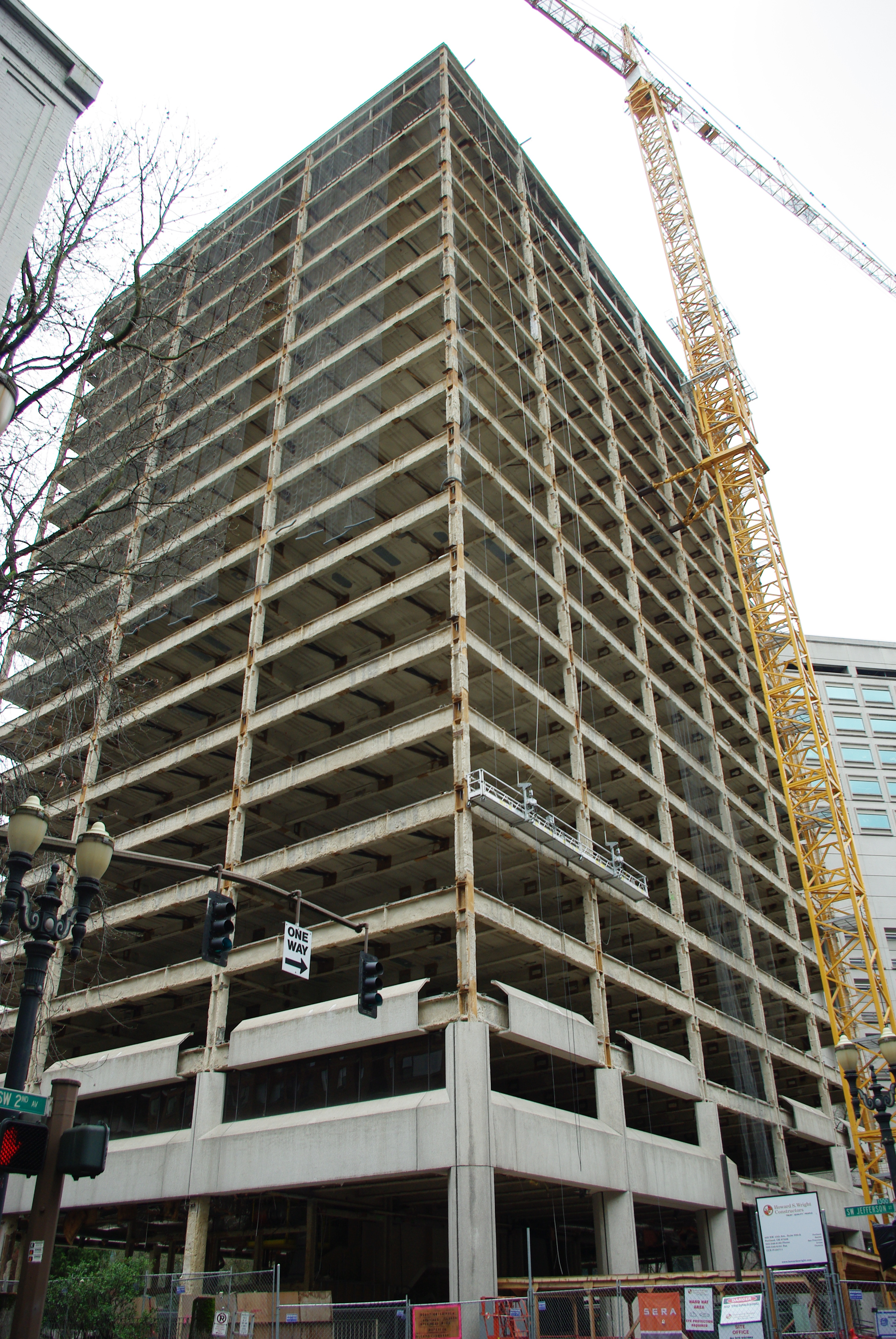
Building during renovations in April 2011

The building suffered another fire in February 1993 when a discarded cigarette caused $25,000 in damage to insulation in the basement. All the occupants were evacuated during the late morning fire that had three alarms called, but was easily extinguished with a single bucket of water. At that time the building was valued at $120 million.

In April 1995, the building was evacuated due to a bomb threat that suggested what happened at the Oklahoma City federal building would occur in Portland. No bomb was found, but the government later added additional security measures to the building that housed 1,200 workers in response to the bombing in Oklahoma City. Loriann J. Debray was later sentenced to three months in jail by federal judge Helen J. Frye for the incident. The new protective measures at the building included adding metal detectors and security guards, elimination of visitor parking in the building's basement, and other vehicles entering the building must show government identification.

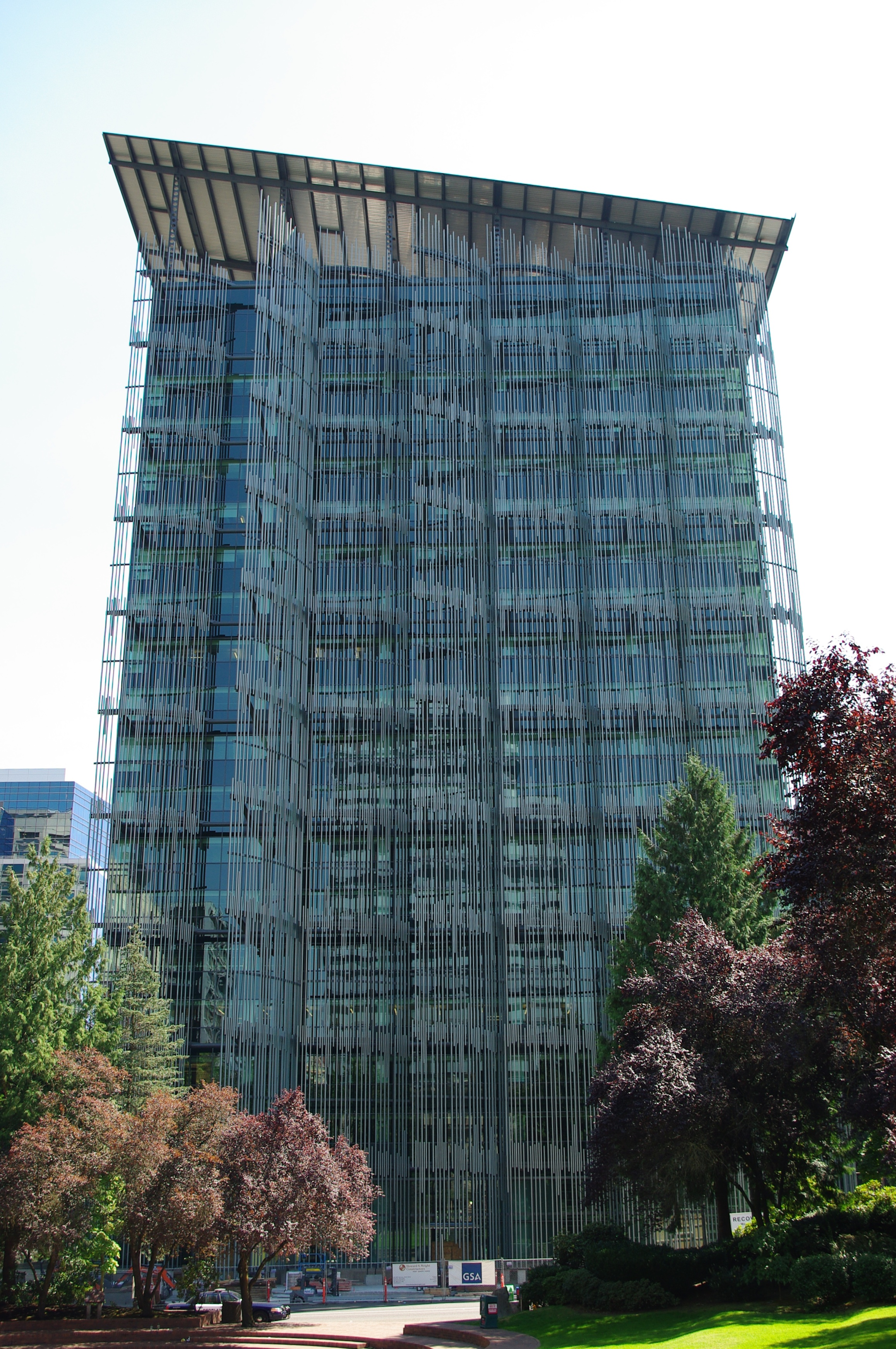
The building in 2012, shortly before the completion of its remodel.

The building was targeted for another bomb threat in October 1995, but no bomb was found. On the one year anniversary of the Oklahoma City bombing, a piece from the Alfred P. Murrah Federal Building was added to a memorial across the street at Terry Schrunk Plaza, which includes an underground parking structure for the Green-Wyatt Building. That structure was the planned assassination site of Charles H. Turner in the failed plot by members of the Rajneeshees in 1985 to kill Turner, the U.S. Attorney for Oregon who worked in the building.

In May 2001, the building was closed for a day after power transformers blew out and knocked out electricity. A similar incident closed the building in February 2004. Green – Wyatt was closed again on September 11, 2001, in the wake of the attack on the World Trade Center in New York and the attack on the Pentagon.

The building started a $133 million overhaul to improve efficiency and make the building more environmentally friendly in 2009. SERA Architects was the architect for the improvements with Cutler Anderson Architects as the Design Excellence consulting architect, which included a new exterior to the structure. PLACE studio was the landscape architect. Funding for the project came from the American Recovery and Reinvestment Act of 2009. Seattle based Howard S. Wright Companies was the construction manager with the project designed to achieve a LEED Platinum rating. The building re-opened in May 2013 after the $139 million remodel with an entirely new look that included a large solar panel on a tilted roof. The Building was named by the American institute of Architects' Committee on the Environment as one of the top 10 sustainable projects of 2015.

=== Protests ===
As the main presence of the federal government in Portland, it is often the site of protests against the government. These protests have included marchers against U.S. aid given to Israel in February 1988, veterans protesting the lack of funding for medical services provided by the Veterans Administration in January 1989, to those marching for a ban on testing nuclear weapons in August 1989. Other groups have rallied to end homelessness, as well as the Gulf War against Iraq in 1991 when nine protesters were arrested at the building. The bombing of Iraq in December 1998 led to further demonstrations, as did the invasion of Iraq in 2003 when seven protesters were arrested in March.

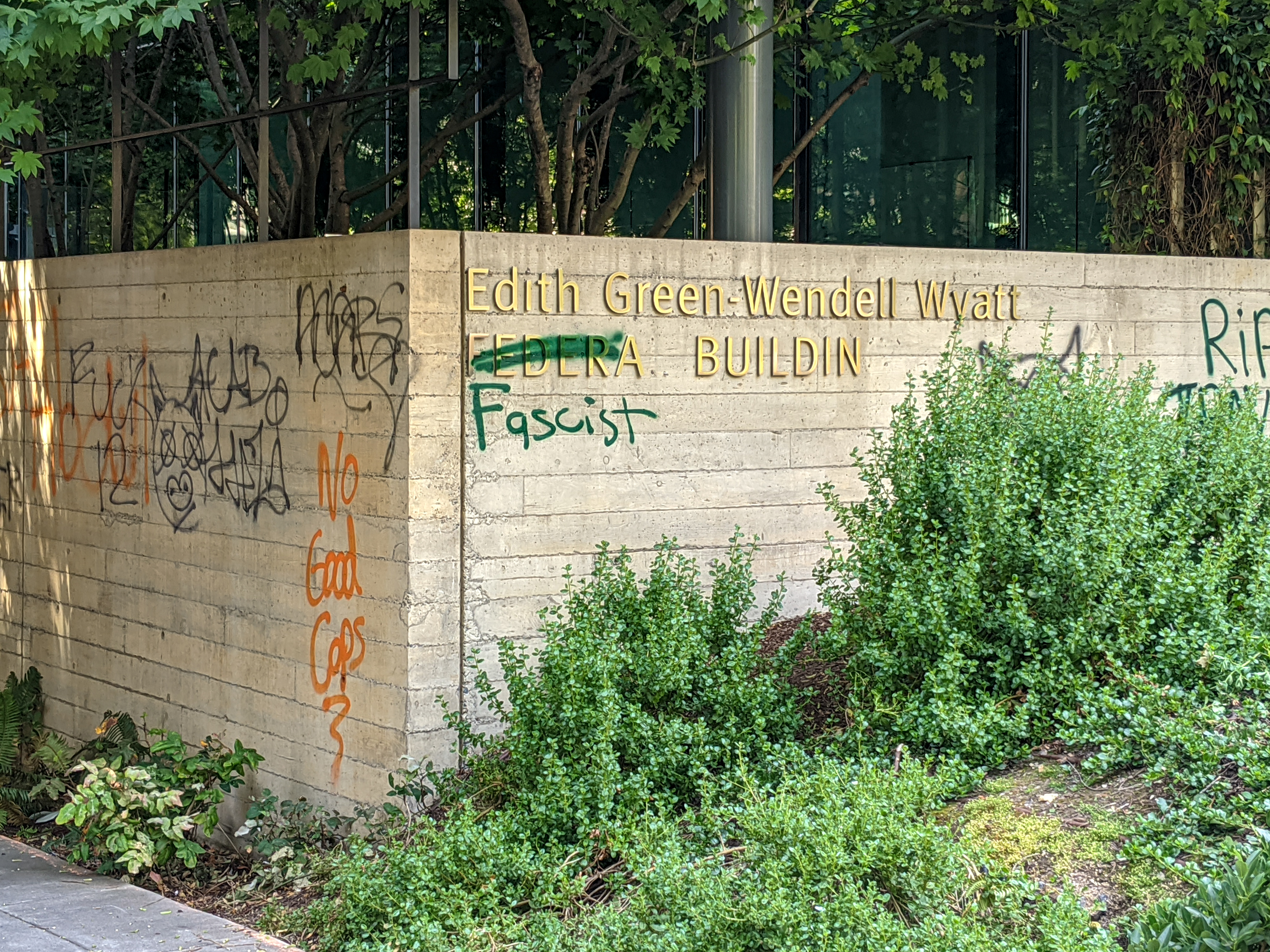

The George Floyd and police brutality protests in Portland were centered near the building.

== Details ==
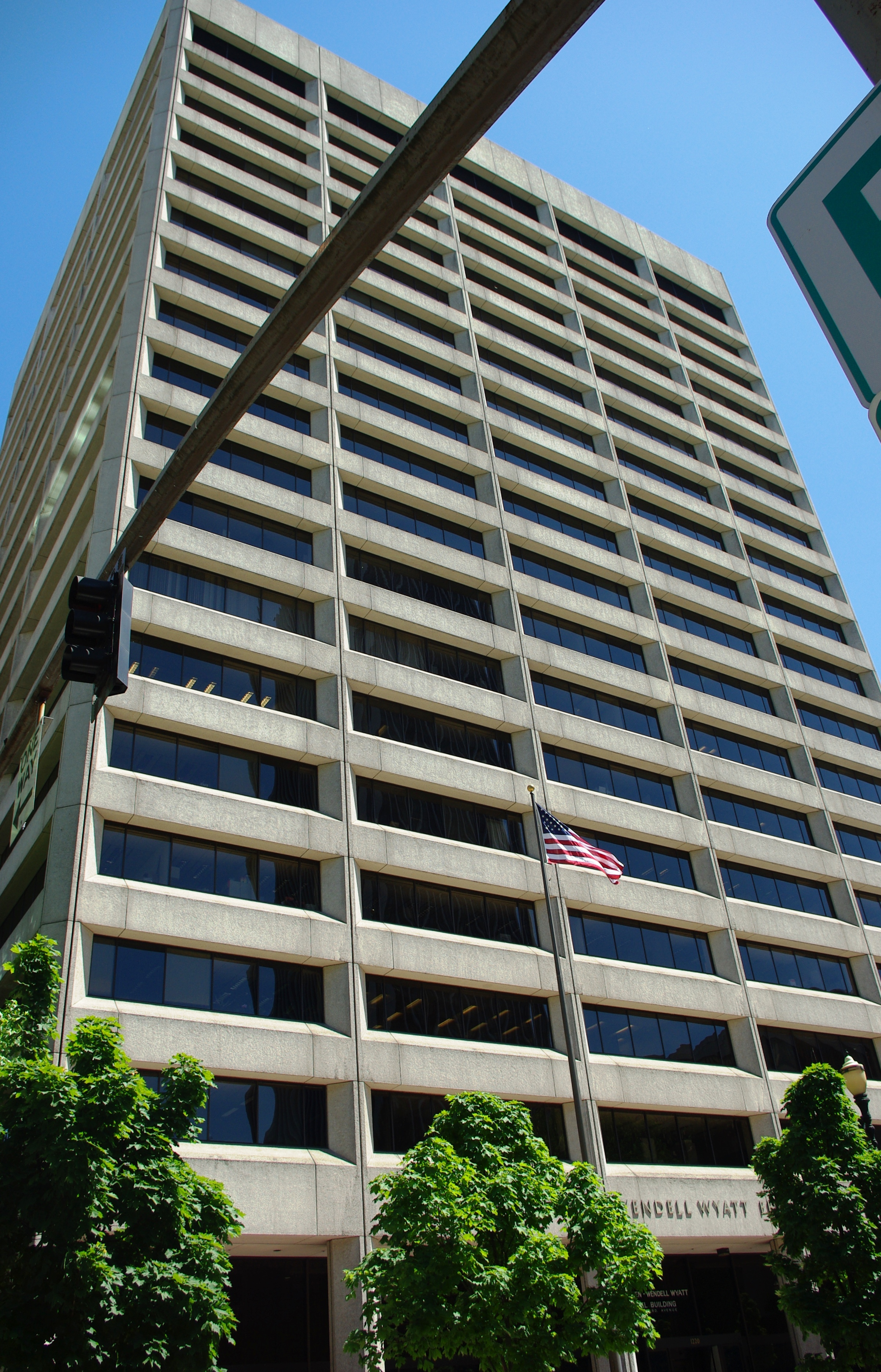
Original look of the building

The 18-story building has 372,461 square feet (34,602.8 m^{2}) of space and stands 270 feet (82 m) tall. Built of concrete and steel, the high-rise is in the international style of architecture. It was designed by the architecture firm of Skidmore, Owings and Merrill. Tenants of the building include the Internal Revenue Service, the U.S. Forest Service, and the Bureau of Land Management, among others. Operated by the General Services Administration (GSA), the building also houses a G.S.A. Café. Parts of the building are also used to exhibit art works. Past exhibits have included those by Black artists during Black History Month and works by disabled artists.

=== Namesakes ===
The building is named after former members of Congress Edith Green (1910-1987) and Wendell Wyatt (1917-2009), who both left Congress in 1975. Wyatt was a native Oregonian who studied law at the University of Oregon before joining the FBI and Marine Corps. A veteran of World War II, he served as Congressman from Oregon's 1st congressional district for ten years as a Republican. Green grew up in Oregon and became a teacher after studying at Willamette University, the University of Oregon, and Stanford University. A Democrat, she spent nearly 20 years representing Oregon's 3rd congressional district.

== See also ==
- List of tallest buildings in Portland, Oregon
- River Legend (1976), located outside the building
