= 2016 Minneapolis shooting =

Hate crime in Minneapolis, Minnesota

- 2016 Minneapolis shooting (Minnesota) 2016 Minneapolis shooting (the United States)
- Location: 44°59′N 93°16′W; Minneapolis, Minnesota, United States
- Date: June 29, 2016 c. 2:30 a.m. (UTC−06:00)
- Target: Somali-Americans
- Attack type: Shooting, hate crime
- Weapon: .38 Handgun
- Deaths: 0
- Injuries: 2
- Perpetrator: Anthony John Sawina
- Motive: Islamophobia; Anti-Somali sentiment

The 2016 Minneapolis shooting took place on June 29, 2016, in Minneapolis, Minnesota when a man named Anthony Sawina shot at five Somali Americans, wounding two of them. Witnesses later recounted that Sawina shouted anti-Muslim expletives and claimed he was "going to kill [them] all." The attack was condemned by civil rights groups as part of a larger rise of Islamophobia in the United States leading up the 2016 presidential election.

== Background ==
Minneapolis has a large immigrant Somali-Muslim population and there have been several anti-Muslim and anti-Somali incidents in Minnesota within the past few years. On Oct. 30, 2015, Asma Jama (a Muslim woman of Somali descent and Kenyan nationality) was beaten for speaking Swahili in an Applebee's in the outskirts of Minneapolis. The perpetrator for that violence was charged with third-degree assault. A week prior to the shooting, a Muslim halal shop in the city was vandalized. According to a study by Georgetown University, the amount of Anti-Muslims increased during the 2016 presidential election. In September 2016, Minnesota was one of 20 states assessed by the Center for the Study of Hate and Extremism at California State University, San Bernardino. They found that while hate crimes overall climbed 5 percent in 2015, crimes targeting Muslims soared 78 percent, with a comparable increase projected this year.

== Attack ==
Anthony Sawina, aged 26, was leaving a bar with friends at 2:30 a.m. when they encountered a group of five Somali men wearing traditional qamis, who had been playing basketball nearby and were walking towards their car. The Somali men were on their way to a mosque for Ramadan prayers. One of Sawina's friends said, "What's that dress you're wearing?" and offered to shake hands. Instead of shaking hands, the Somali men continued to climb into their car and another of Sawina's companions shouted, "Fuck Muslims." When one of the Somalis objected to the remark, Sawina allegedly shouted, "What if someone said it? What if?" At this point, Sawina was alleged to have drawn a gun and begun shooting at the Somalis, hitting the car windshield. Two of the Somalis were shot in the leg and treated at a hospital. The victims later stated they heard Sawina say "I’m going to kill you all."

== Investigation ==
Anthony Sawina was captured on July 21, 2016, and a handgun was found in his possession. Sawina had two previous convictions for carrying a handgun without a permit. He was charged with multiple counts of second-degree assault with a dangerous weapon. His bail was set at $75,000 and faced up to seven years in prison. The police confirmed on June 30 that they were investigating the incident as a hate crime. The FBI also reviewed the case as a hate crime and for potential federal civil rights charges.

=== Trial ===
Sawina was tried on nine counts of felony, including attempted murder in the first degree. On May 11, 2017, Sawina was convicted of all charges, including attempted first-degree murder. Sawina received a 39-year sentence, which prompted him to angrily rebuke the judge. Sawina appealed his sentence in 2018 as excessive.

== Reactions ==
Minnesota Congressman Keith Ellison called for the U.S. Department of Justice to investigate the crime.

Jaylani Hussein, executive director of the Council on American-Islamic Relations in Minnesota (CAIR-MN), stated the attack was evidence of growing tension and fear for Muslims across America. Hassan Jama of the Islamic Association of North America called on "all Americans to stand with us, all Minnesotans to stand with us" and condemn the shooting as a hate crime.

Following Sawina's conviction, CAIR-MN welcomed the result, stating it was justified.

The shooting was one of the hate crimes cited by the FBI in October 2016.

== See also ==
- Quebec City mosque shooting
- 2017 Olathe, Kansas shooting
- 2023 shooting of Palestinian students in Burlington
