= Terry Schrunk Plaza =

Park in Portland, Oregon, U.S.

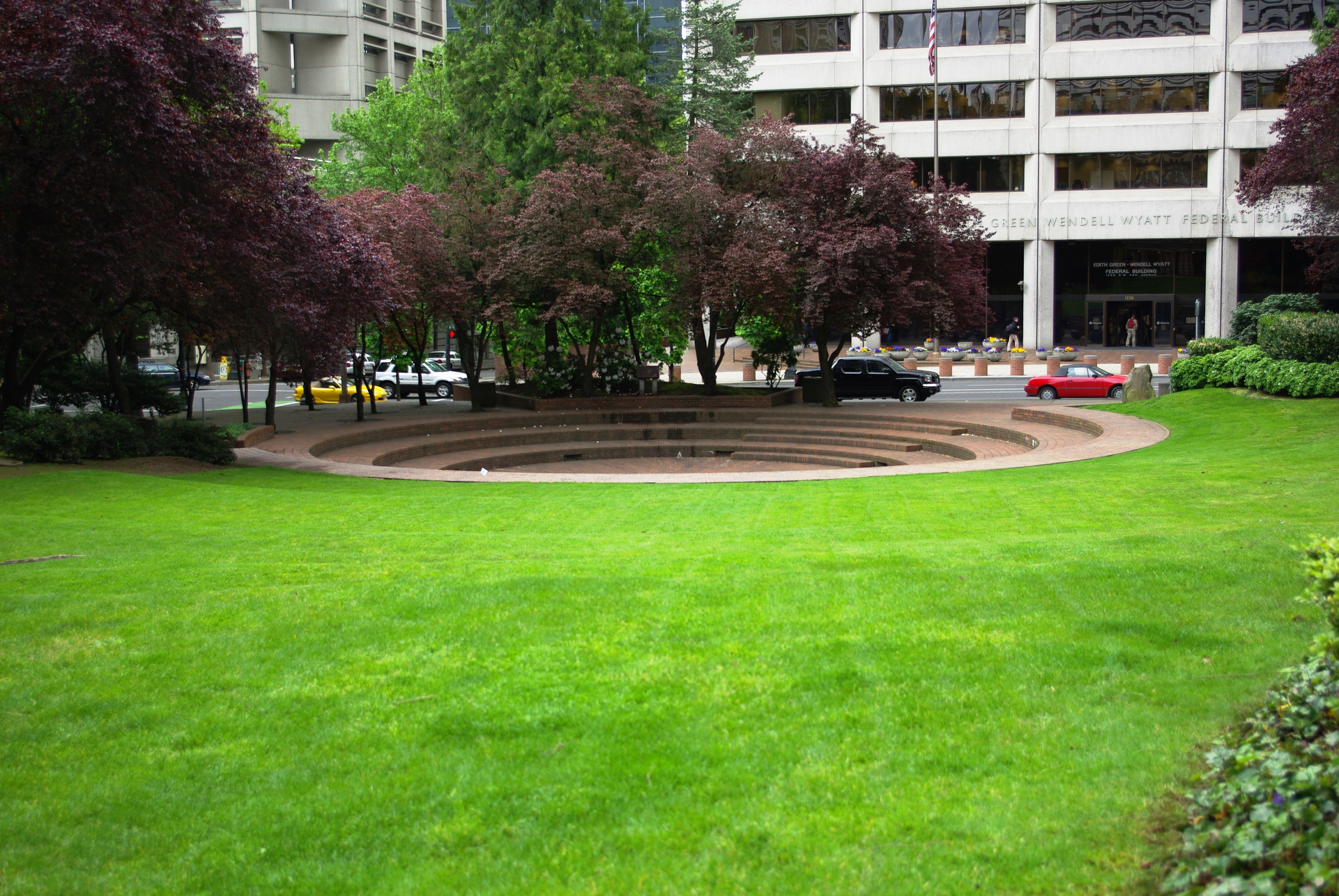
- Amphitheater area of the park, 2010
- Interactive map of Terry Schrunk Plaza
- Location: Portland, Oregon, United States
- Coordinates: 45.5146°N 122.678°W

Terry Schrunk Plaza is a park located in downtown Portland, Oregon, United States. Located in between the Edith Green – Wendell Wyatt Federal Building and Portland City Hall, and adjacent to the Plaza Blocks, it is owned and operated by the federal government.

== History ==
In 1972, The Oregonian published an artist's conception for a "Federal Plaza" to be built across from the Edith Green – Wendell Wyatt Federal Building. The park was constructed from 1974 to 1977, with a dedication held in 1977.

The park was named for former Portland mayor Terry Schrunk, thanks in part to a recommendation to President Gerald Ford by US Senators Mark Hatfield and Bob Packwood.

=== Planned assassination ===
The plaza covers an underground parking structure for the adjacent federal building. That structure was the planned assassination site of Charles H. Turner in the failed plot by members of the Rajneeshees in 1985 to kill Turner, the U.S. Attorney for Oregon who worked in the building.

== Features ==
There are several Taihu stones in the plaza which is a gift from Portland's Chinese sister city, Suzhou in 1996.

The park also features a memorial plaque honoring Vietnam veterans.

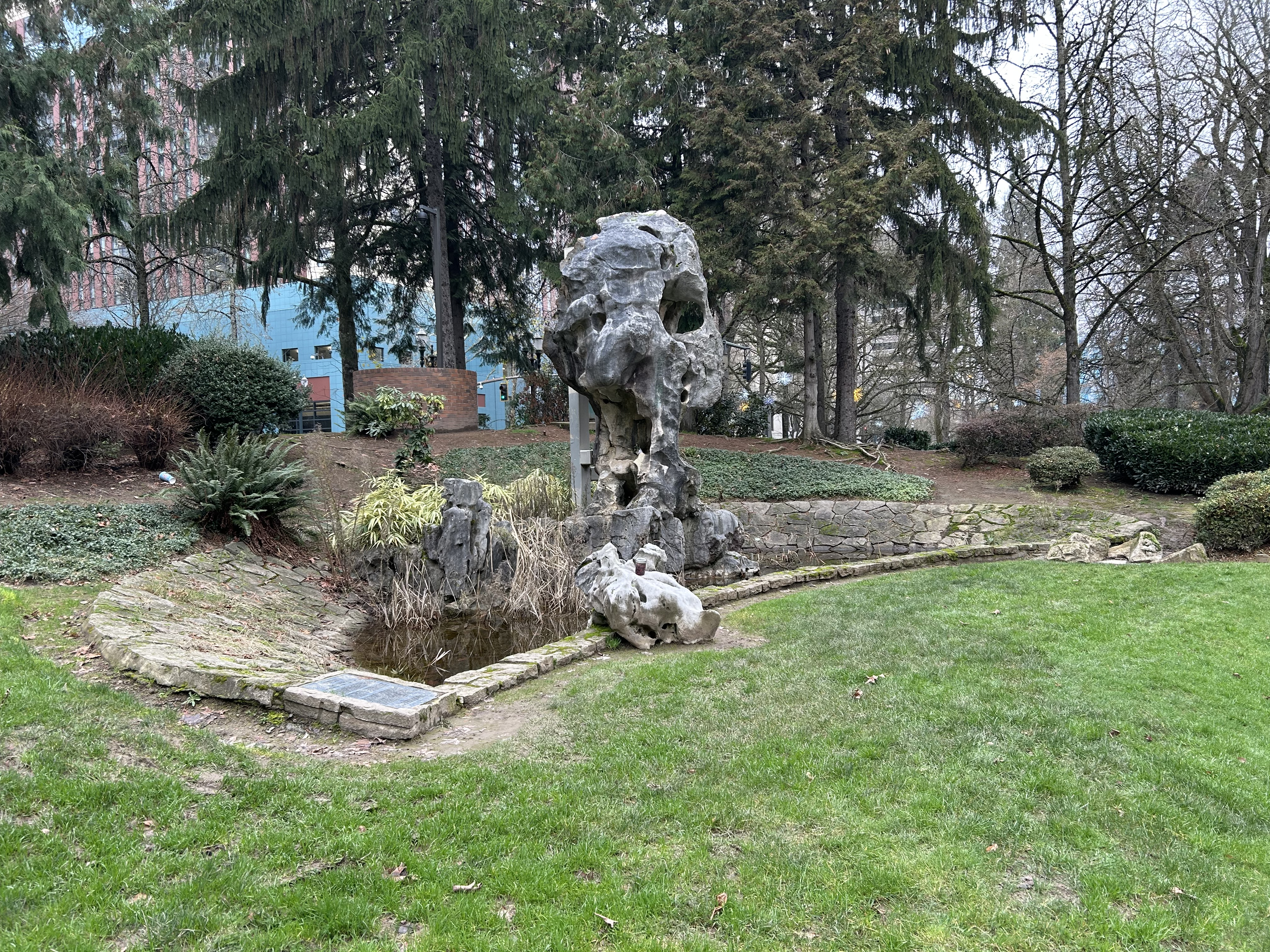
Taihu stones in the plaza gifted by Portland's sister city Suzhou, China

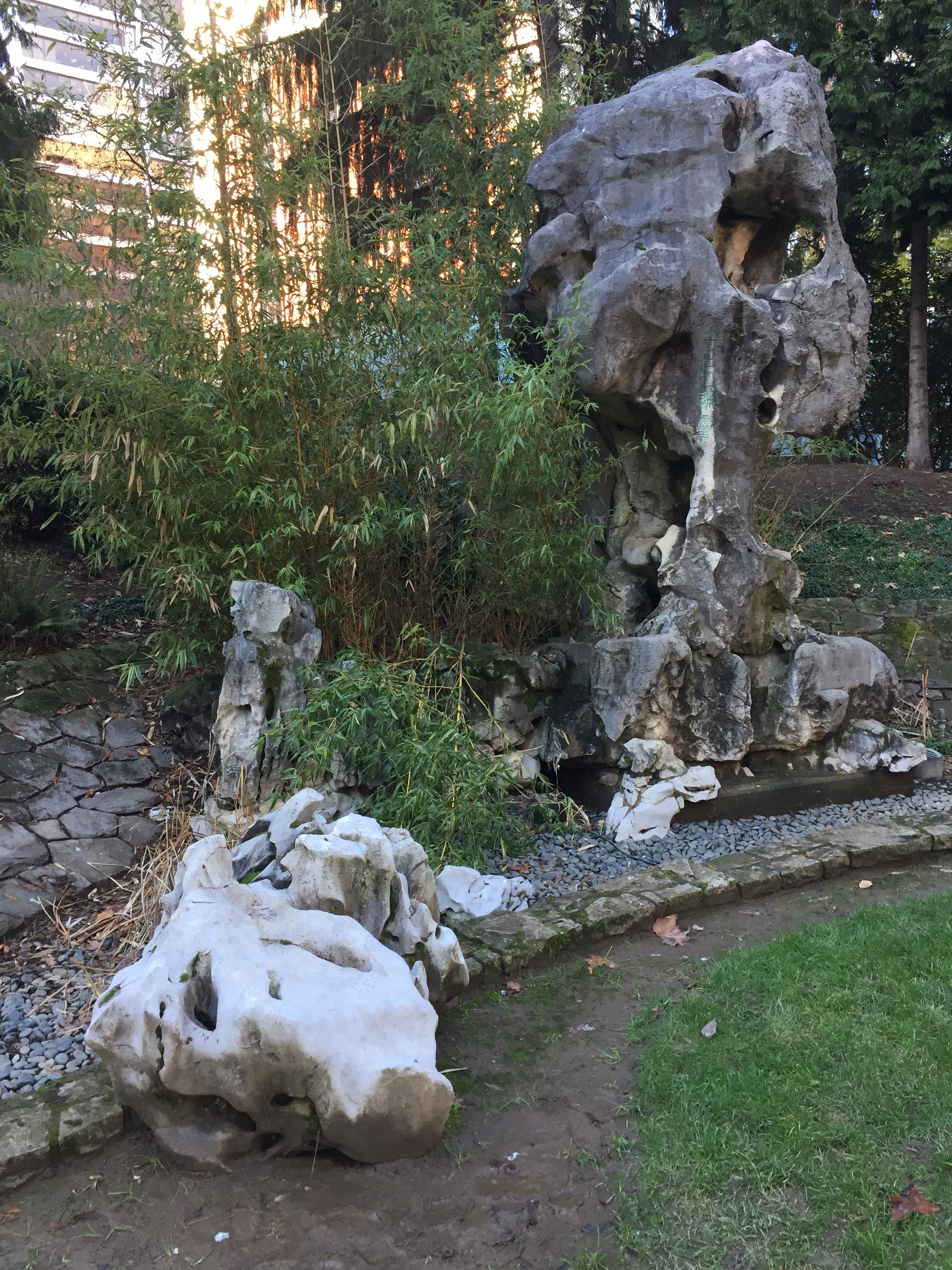
Closeup of the Taihu stones

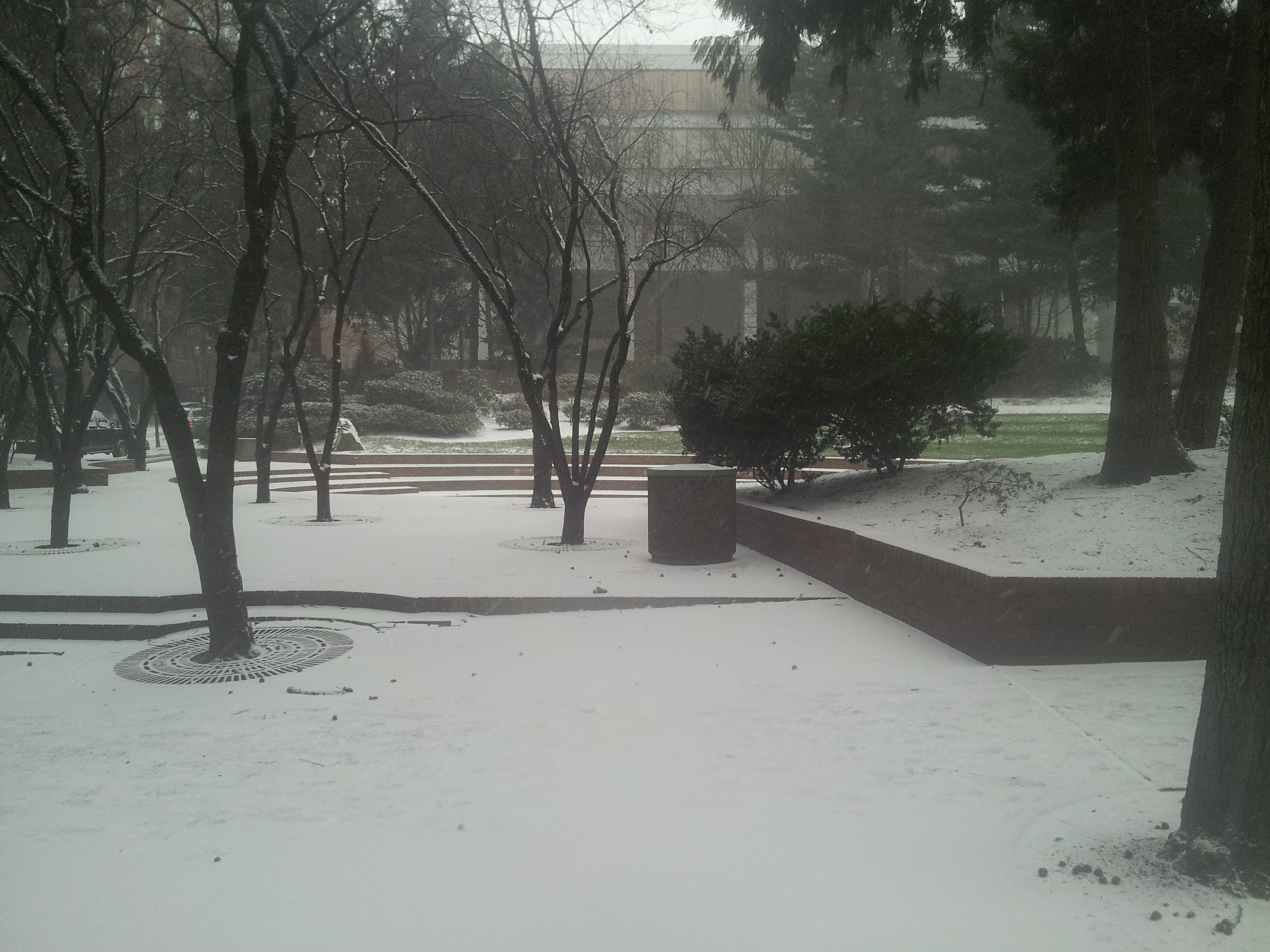
The plaza after a snowstorm in 2014

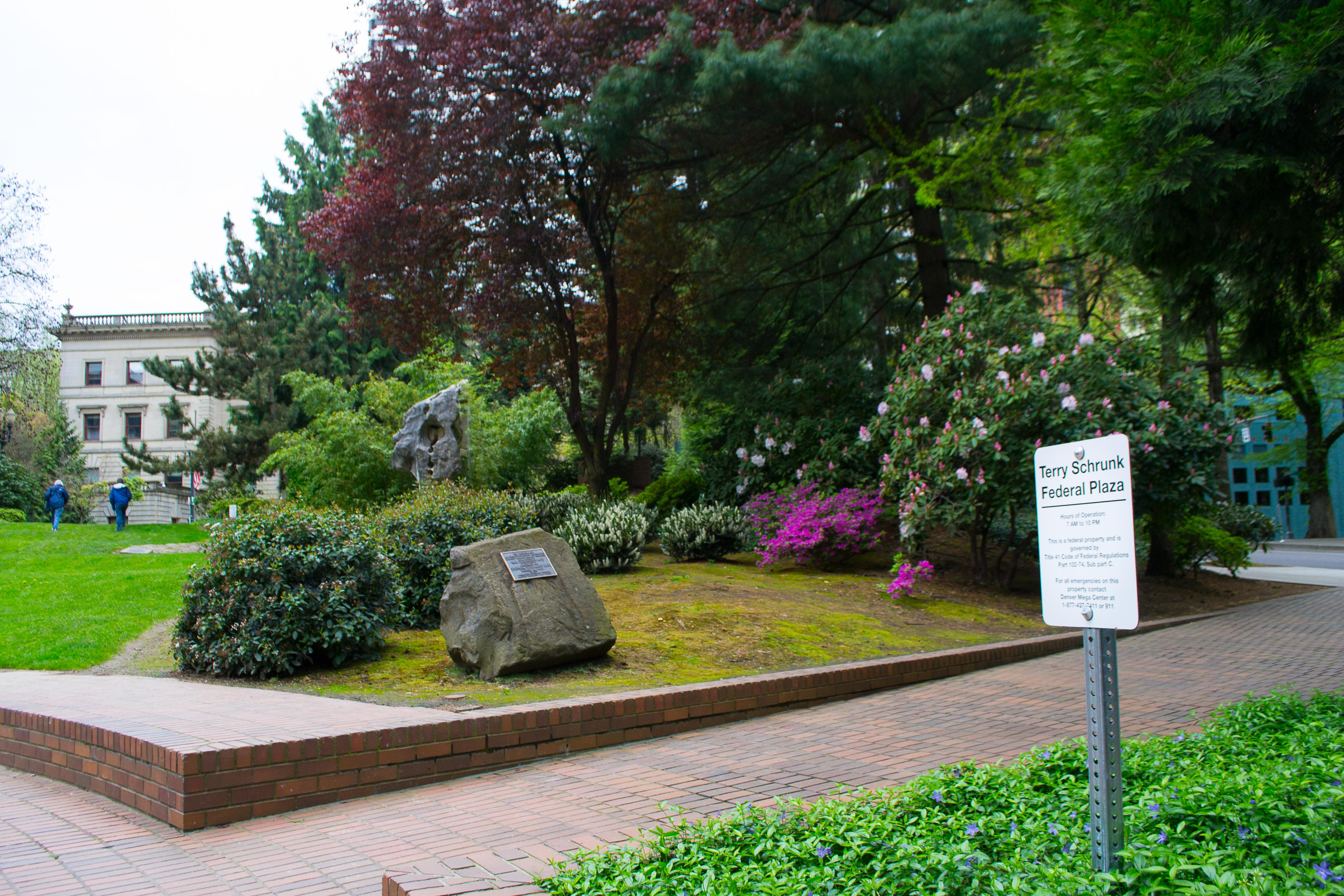

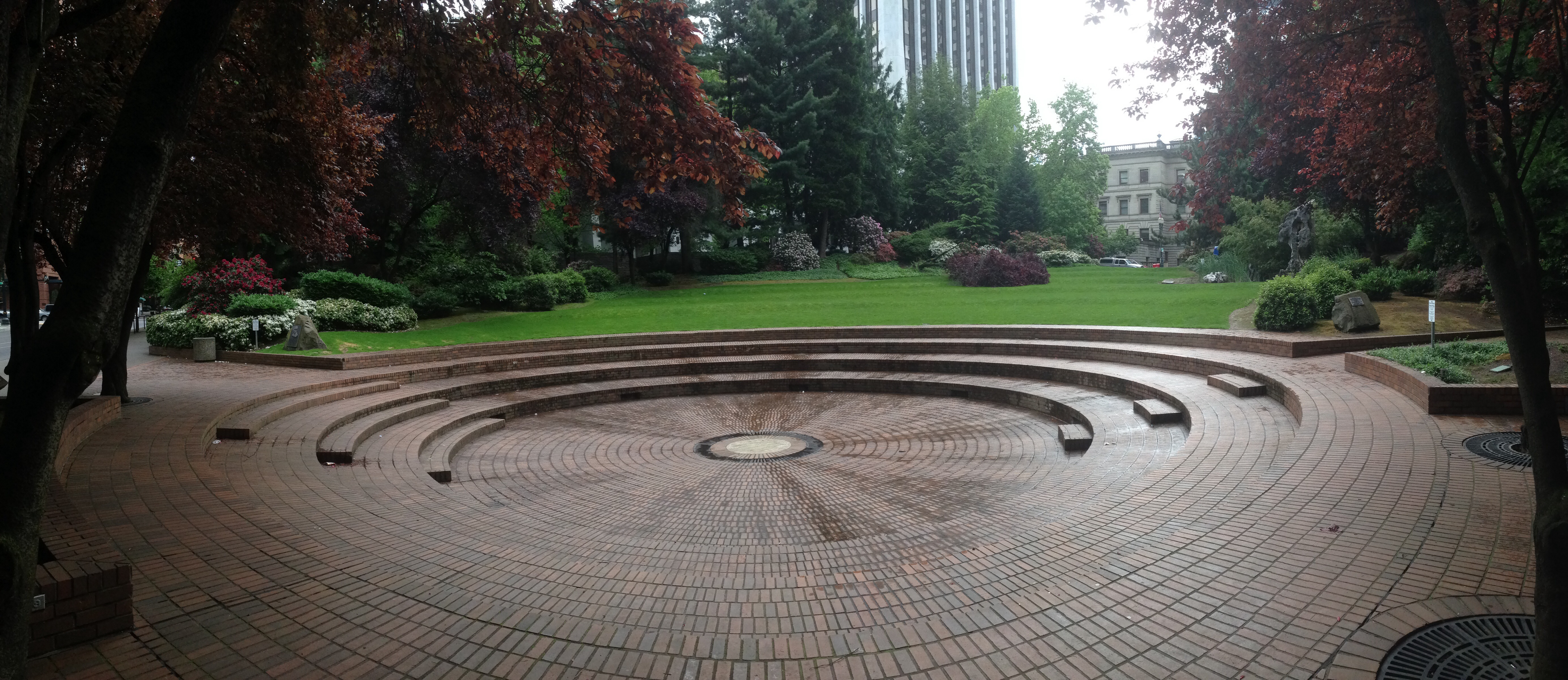
A close-up of the amphitheater

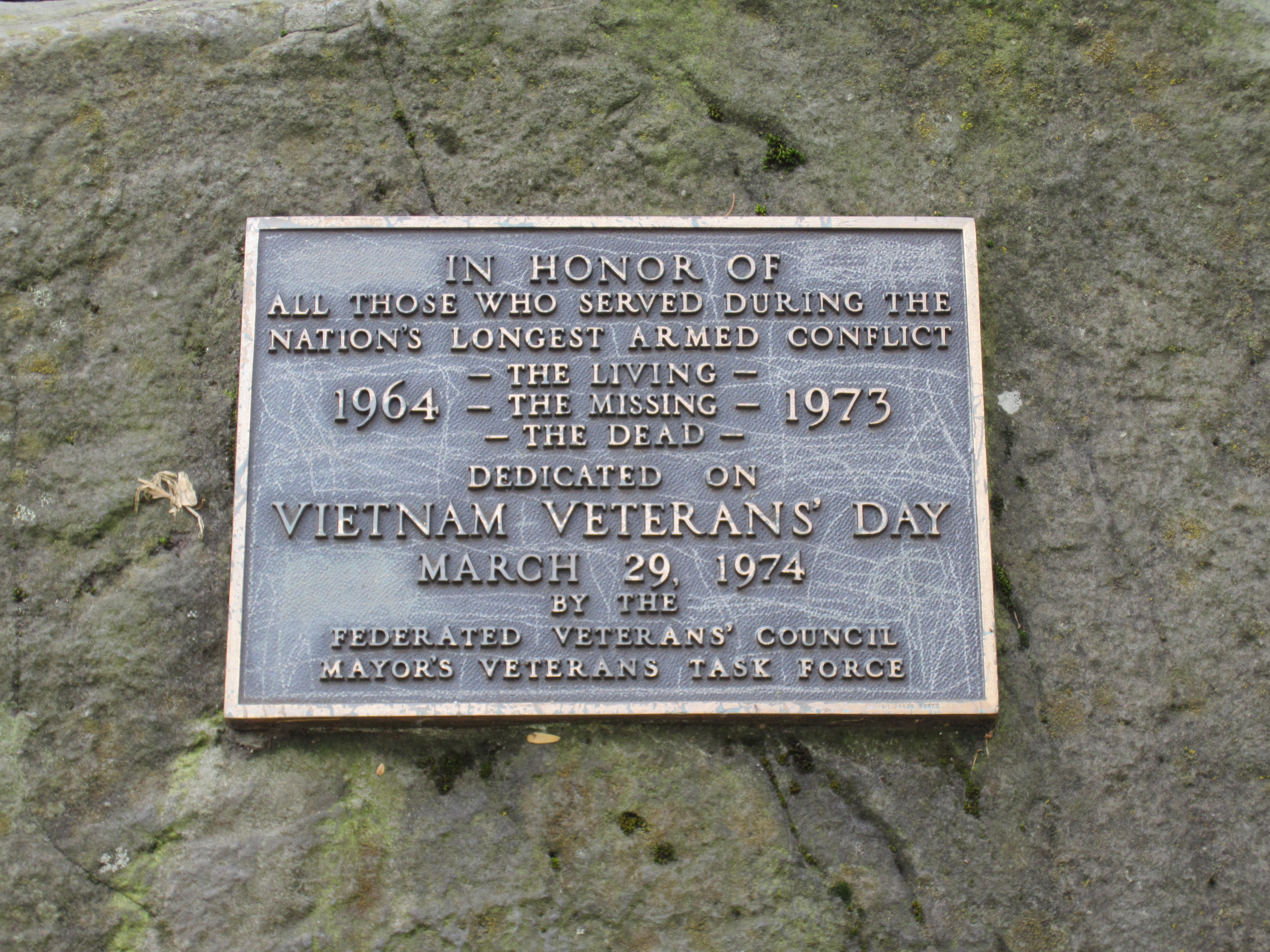
Vietnam Veterans memorial plaque

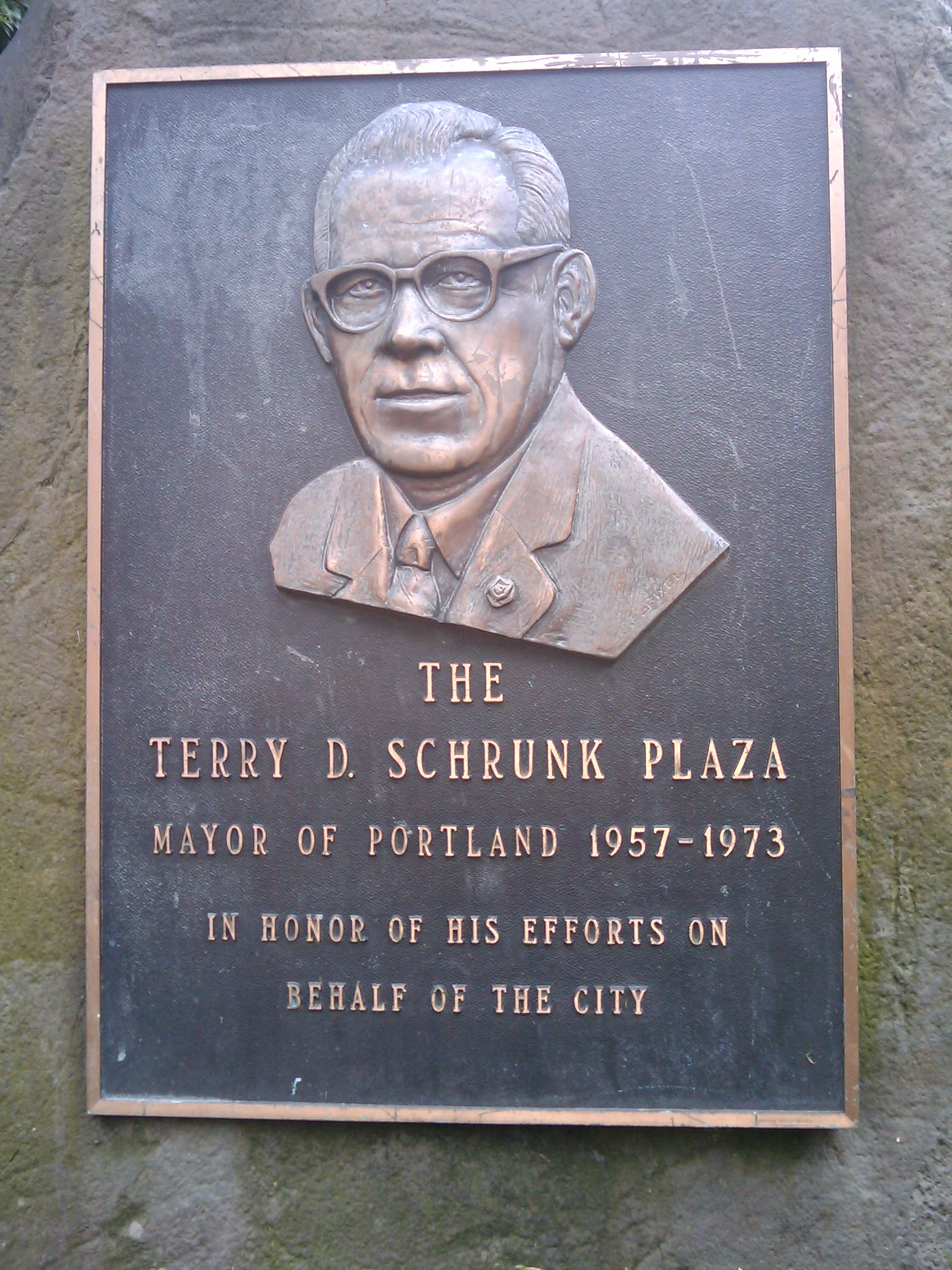
Sign for the Plaza

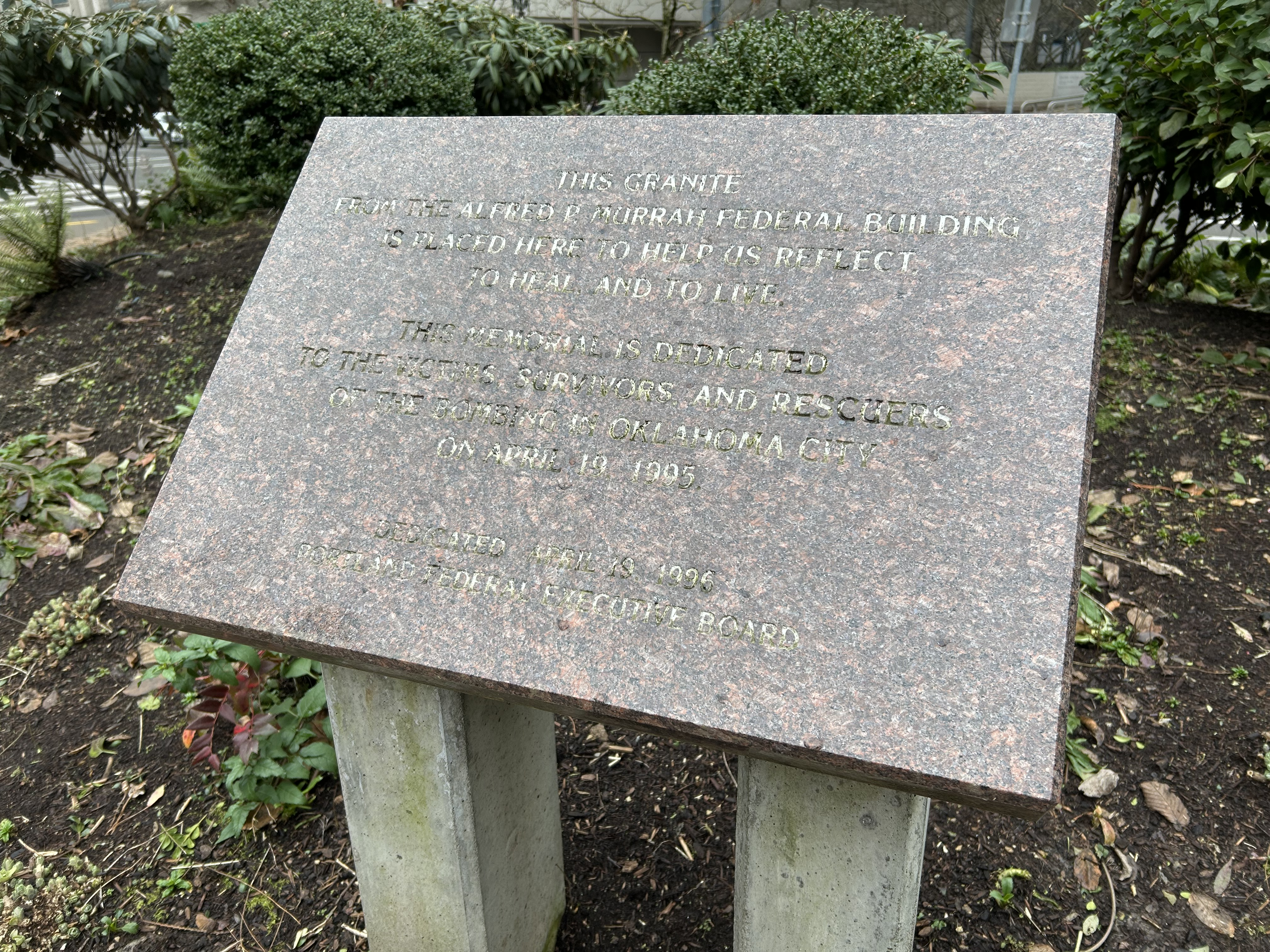
Oklahoma City bombing memorial
