= Bowman-Biltmore Hotels =

Former hotel chain

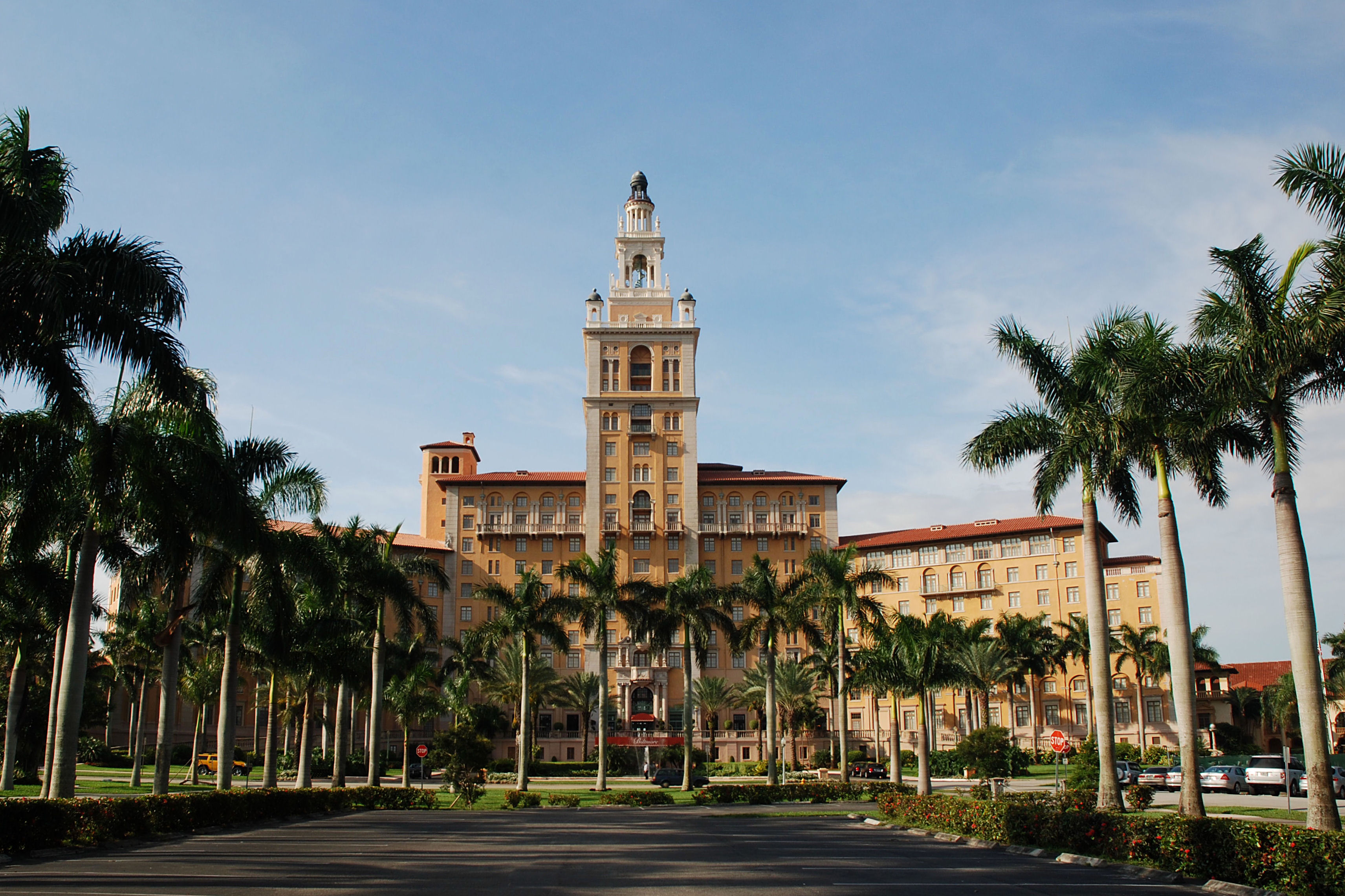
Biltmore Hotel, Coral Gables, Florida

Bowman-Biltmore Hotels was a hotel chain created by the hotel magnate John McEntee Bowman.

The name evokes the Vanderbilt family's Biltmore Estate, whose buildings and the gardens within are privately owned historical landmarks and tourist attractions in Asheville, North Carolina, United States. The name has since been adopted by other unrelated hotels. For a time, the Bowman-Biltmore Hotels Corporation was a publicly traded company.

== Historic locations ==
Country	State	Name	Location	Opening	Notes
United States	Arizona	Arizona Biltmore	Phoenix	23 February 1929	Opened by Warren McArthur Jr. and his brother Charles McArthur along with John McEntee Bowman. Co-designed by their brother the Chicago architect Albert Chase McArthur, who asked Frank Lloyd Wright to collaborate.
United States	California	Flintridge Biltmore	La Cañada Flintridge, atop the San Rafael Hills	1926	The site of the present day Flintridge Sacred Heart Academy campus. Designed by architect Myron Hunt in 1926, in the Mediterranean Revival and Spanish Colonial Revival architecture styles, and commissioned by owner Senator Frank Putnam Flint. The business failed as the Great Depression continued, and the hotel was closed and sold in 1931 to the Dominican Sisters of Mission San Jose to found the Flintridge Sacred Heart Academy there.
United States	California	Los Angeles Biltmore	Pershing Square in Downtown Los Angeles	1923	Largest hotel west of Chicago in the United States when it opened. Designed by the architectural firm of Schultze & Weaver. "Nerve center" of the 1960 Democratic National Convention, headquarters of the Democratic National Committee, and of the candidates including John F. Kennedy, Lyndon B. Johnson, and Adlai Stevenson. Room 8315 was used for the John Kennedy campaign.
United States	California	Santa Barbara Biltmore	Santa Barbara, California	1927	Masterly synthesis of the Spanish Revival, Mediterranean Revival, Spanish Colonial Revival and Moorish Revival styles of architecture and landscape architecture. Four Seasons Hotels bought the hotel in 1987. Ty Warner acquired ownership of the hotel through his Ty Warner Hotels & Resorts in 2000, with a historically sensitive major restoration and services updating following.
United States	Connecticut	The Griswold	New London, Connecticut	1906	Acquired from the estate of Morton Freeman Plant in 1919 along with the Belleview Biltmore. Demolished 1968.
United States	Delaware	Hotel du Pont	Wilmington, Delaware	1913	Managed by the Bowman-Biltmore Hotel company and named the Du Pont Biltmore from 1927 to 1933.
United States	Florida	Belleview Biltmore	Belleair, Florida	1897	Acquired from the estate of Morton Freeman Plant in 1919 along with The Griswold. Hotel originally built by railroad tycoon Henry B. Plant and operated by his son Morton Freeman Plant until his death in 1918. Partially demolished in 2016.
United States	Florida	Miami Biltmore	Coral Gables, Florida	1926	Opened by Bowman and George Merrick. National Historic Landmark. Sold to Henry L. Doherty in 1931. Served as a hospital during World War II and as a VA Hospital and campus of the University of Miami medical school until 1968. Became a hotel again in 1987, managed by Seaway Hotels Corporation. President Obama stayed at the Biltmore prior to delivering a speech at the University of Miami.
United States	Georgia	Atlanta Biltmore	Atlanta	1924	Designed by Schultze & Weaver at a cost of $6 million. Organized by Coca-Cola heir William Candler, Holland Ball Judkins, and Bowman. Today an office building.
United States	New York	Hotel Ansonia		1904	Apartment building. For a time an apartment hotel run by Bowman Biltmore.
United States	New York	Hotel Belmont	42nd Street from Grand Central Terminal	1908	Tallest hotel in the world when built. Demolished in 1939.
United States	New York	The Biltmore		January 28, 1919	Designed by Warren & Wetmore as a part of Terminal City, a massive complex of hotels and office buildings connected to Grand Central Terminal. Home to the Grand Central Art Galleries for 23 years, founded in 1922 by John Singer Sargent, Edmund Greacen, Walter Leighton Clark, and others. 1942: Biltmore Conference, the meeting that produced the Biltmore Program. Closed in August 1981 by Paul Milstein and converted to an office building. retaining the Biltmore's famous Palm Court clock. Milstein's grandson, Michael, led another major renovation and modernization of the building, which was renamed 22 Vanderbilt in 2022.
United States	New York	Hotel Commodore		1919	Designed by Warren & Wetmore. On the opposite side of Grand Central from the Hotel Belmont. Bought by Donald Trump in the 1970s and converted to the Grand Hyatt New York. The lower levels were gutted to their steel skeleton, retaining the original floorplan, while the exterior was covered in a modern reflective glass facade.
United States	New York	Murray Hill Hotel	Park Avenue between 40th and 41st Streets	1884	Demolished in 1947.
United States	New York	The Roosevelt Hotel		September 22, 1924	Connected to Grand Central Terminal. Opened as a United Hotel and merged with the Bowman-Biltmore Group in 1929. Purchased by Conrad Hilton in 1948. Operated by Realty Hotel (owned by New York Central Railroad) until 1980. Then operated by the Novotel group through a lease with the property's owner, Pakistan Airlines. Operated by Interstate Hotels & Resorts until its closure in 2020.
United States	New York	Westchester Biltmore Country Club	Westchester County, New York	1922	Founded by Bowman, who hired Walter Travis to design two golf courses.
United States	Ohio	Dayton Biltmore		1929	Converted into a retirement home in 1981. Listed on the National Register of Historic Places.
United States	Rhode Island	Providence Biltmore		1922	Listed on the National Register of Historic Places.
Cuba		Sevilla Biltmore	Havana	1908	Bought by Bowman and Charles Francis Flynn in November, 1919. Featured in Graham Greene's novel Our Man in Havana (1958), where Jim Wormold joined the British secret service.
Cuba		Havana Biltmore Yacht & Country Club		1928	Managed by the Bowman Biltmore company.

== Planned hotels ==
A Detroit Biltmore was planned for the site of the Hotel Tuller on Detroit's Grand Circus Park. The Tuller was to have been demolished in 1929 and replaced by a towering 35-story, 1500 room hotel with an attached 14-story garage and 18-story office building. The plans were abandoned when the stock market crashed that year.

== Unassociated hotels ==
=== Florida ===
The Palm Beach Biltmore was not connected to the Bowman Biltmore group. It was built in 1926 as the Alba, renamed The Ambassador in 1929, and sold to Henry L. Doherty in 1933. Doherty, who had bought the Miami Biltmore two years earlier, renamed the hotel the Palm Beach Biltmore. It was later owned by Hilton Hotels, closed in the 1970s, and was converted to condos from 1979 to 1981.

=== Hawaii ===
The Waikiki Biltmore was a resort hotel on Waikiki, Honolulu, Hawaii, that operated from 1955 to 1974. The Biltmore was the first high-rise hotel on Waikiki but operated for only 19 years and was demolished and replaced with the Hyatt Regency.

Permits were filed for an eight-story hotel in March 1953, with groundbreaking taking place in November of that year. Joseph Greenbach constructed the building, which opened on February 19, 1955. Construction cost $4 million. The hotel was built on the site of Canlis Charcoal Broiler, the first restaurant opened by Peter Canlis, which opened in 1947. The opening was met with great fanfare, including a flight from California chartered by Greenbach.

=== Nevada ===
The Tahoe Biltmore, a hotel-casino, operated from 1948 to 2022 in Crystal Bay, Nevada. It is expected to be demolished in 2025, with a Waldorf Astoria hotel taking its place in 2028.

=== Oklahoma ===
The Oklahoma Biltmore in Oklahoma City was an unassociated hotel that once stood downtown, at 228 West Grand Avenue. It was built in 1932 during the Great Depression by the city's prominent civic leaders at the time, headed by Charles F. Colcord. Designed by architects Hawk & Parr, the Biltmore had 619 rooms and was 24 stories high, making it the state's second tallest building only to the Ramsey Tower built in 1931, when it was completed. In 1936 alone, the Biltmore was headquarters for 104 conventions and saw 114,171 guests. After a $3 million renovation in the mid-1960s the Biltmore was renamed the Sheraton-Oklahoma Hotel. By 1973, the hotel had left Sheraton, and the Oklahoma City Urban Renewal Authority agreed with the owners that the Biltmore had outlived its useful life. In contrast, architect I. M. Pei had envisioned keeping the hotel, and his sketches and models all showed the tower overlooking the surrounding "Tivoli Gardens". The hotel was one of the largest demolitions in the country at the time it was blown up on October 16, 1977, by a team of demolition specialists to make way for the "Myriad Gardens". Hundreds of low-yield explosives were planted throughout the building so that it would collapse and fall inward into an acceptable area only slightly larger than the hotel's foundation.
