= Biltmore Theater =

Biltmore Theater may refer to the following in the United States:

- Samuel J. Friedman Theatre, formerly the Biltmore Theatre, in Manhattan, New York
- Biltmore Theater, now The Biltmore Los Angeles, California
