= Schultze & Weaver =

Former American architecture firm

Schultze & Weaver was an architecture firm established in New York City in 1921. The partners were Leonard Schultze and S. Fullerton Weaver.

== History ==
Leonard B. Schultze was born in Chicago, Illinois, on December 5, 1877. He was educated at the City College of New York and ranks high among the most successful pupils of Franco-American architect Emmanuel Louis Masqueray, founder of the Atelier Masqueray. Schultze had been an employee of the firm of Warren & Wetmore, and during his twenty years in that company's office he had worked on the designs for such projects as New York's Grand Central Terminal.

Weaver's primary responsibilities in the new firm were in engineering, business, and real estate. Schultze & Weaver's first major commission was from John McEntee Bowman's Biltmore Hotels, for the large Los Angeles hotel today known as the Millennium Biltmore.

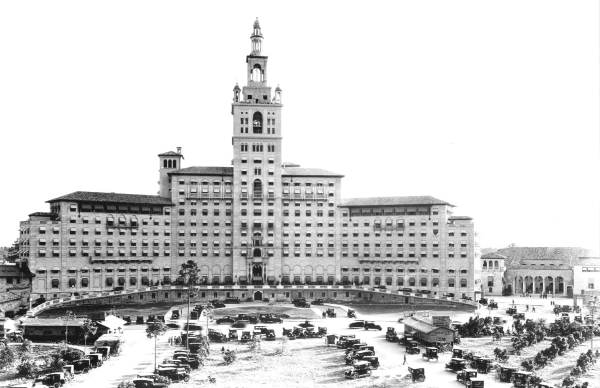
Biltmore Hotel- Coral Gables, Florida.

Their later work included several other projects for the same company, including the Atlanta Biltmore Hotel, and the Coral Gables Biltmore Hotel. The firm also designed the Breakers Hotel in Palm Beach and the Miami Nautilus Hotel. In addition to their work outside New York, they designed several noted landmark hotels within the city, including The Park Lane Hotel, The Lexington Hotel (now the Radisson Lexington Hotel), The Pierre Hotel and its neighbor, the Sherry-Netherland. Schultze & Weaver architect Lloyd Morgan (1892–1970), in 1929, designed the Waldorf-Astoria Hotel which, upon its completion in 1931, was the world's largest, with 2,200 rooms. Schultze & Weaver redesigned and renovated the Grand Ballroom in New York City's Plaza Hotel in the autumn of 1929.

Though best known for their work on luxury hotels, Schultze & Weaver also designed schools, hospitals, residential developments, and office buildings such as the 1925 New York headquarters of the J.C. Penney Company. Among their other buildings are the Hunter-Dulin building on Sutter Street in San Francisco and Miami's Freedom Tower. They also designed the U.S. Post Office at Scarsdale, New York, as consulting architects for the Office of the Supervising Architect.

After Weaver died in 1940 Schultze reorganized the firm under the name Leonard Schultze and Associates. During this period the firm designed three large apartment complexes for the Metropolitan Life Insurance Company, and a fourth that served as housing for United Nations employees in New York. These are listed below.

== List of works ==
=== National Register of Historic Places ===
==== California ====
- Bank of America Building, Los Angeles, (1924)
- Orpheum Theater, Los Angeles (1925)
- Subway Terminal Building, Los Angeles (1925)
- Hunter-Dulin Building, San Francisco (1925)

==== Florida ====
- Miami Biltmore Hotel, Coral Gables (1925)
- Breakers Hotel, Palm Beach (1925)
- Freedom Tower, Miami (1925)

==== New York ====
- Montauk Manor, Montauk (1926)
- Plaza Hotel Ballroom, New York City (1929)
- United States Post Office, Scarsdale (1937)
- Parkway Village, New York City (1948)

==== Elsewhere ====
- Biltmore Hotel, Atlanta (1924)
- Parkfairfax, Alexandria, Virginia (1941)

=== Other buildings ===
==== Los Angeles ====
- Millennium Biltmore Hotel (1922)
- Jonathan Club (1923)
- Pacific Mutual Garage (1924)
- Park La Brea (1944), for the Metropolitan Life Insurance Company

==== New York City ====
- Park Lane Apartment Hotel (1922)
- J. C. Penney Co. Building (1925)
- Sherry-Netherland Hotel (1926)
- Brisbane House (1928)
- Hotel Pierre (1929)
- Lexington Hotel (1929)
- Fifth Avenue Bank Building (1931)
- Waldorf-Astoria Hotel (1931)

==== Elsewhere ====
- Hotel Sevilla-Biltmore, Havana, Cuba (1924)
- Ingraham Building, Miami (1926)
- News-Sun Building, Springfield, Ohio (1929)
- Parkmerced, San Francisco, California (1944), for the Metropolitan Life Insurance Company
