= Nautilus Hotel =

Hotel in Miami Beach, Florida

The Nautilus
- Interactive map of the The Nautilus area

General information
- Architectural style: Spanish Colonial Revival
- Location: Miami Beach, Florida, U.S., 4300 Alton Road
- Opened: January 10, 1924
- Demolished: 1968

Design and construction
- Architect: Schultze & Weaver
- Developer: Carl G. Fisher

Other information
- Number of rooms: 183

The Nautilus was a luxury hotel in Miami Beach, Florida, United States. Developed by Carl G. Fisher and designed by the architectural firm Schultze & Weaver, it opened on January 10, 1924, overlooking Biscayne Bay. The six-story hotel was built in a Mediterranean Revival style and included guest rooms, villas, swimming facilities, cabanas, and a polo field.

The hotel operated as a resort during the Florida land boom of the 1920s before being converted to military hospital use during World War II. After the war, the property became associated with Mount Sinai Hospital, which opened on the site in 1949. The original Nautilus building was demolished in 1968.

== History ==
=== Construction and opening ===
The Nautilus was developed by Carl G. Fisher, one of the principal developers of Miami Beach during the city's rapid growth in the 1920s. The architectural firm Schultze & Weaver, consisting of Leonard Schultze and S. Fullerton Weaver, designed the hotel in the Mediterranean Revival style that became characteristic of Miami Beach's resort architecture during the period. The building was constructed at a cost of nearly $1 million. The firm also designed several other prominent hotels, including the New York City Waldorf Astoria, the Miami Biltmore Hotel, and the Palm Beach Breakers resort.

The Nautilus opened for business on January 10, 1924, on the bay side of Miami Beach near 41st Street. The hotel stood on what is now the site of Mount Sinai Medical Center. The six-story building contained 183 rooms and villas and was part of a larger resort complex. Its grounds included swimming facilities, cabanas, docks, and a polo field. The hotel was positioned as a luxury resort for wealthy visitors to Miami Beach.

=== Resort era ===
The Nautilus became one of the major resort hotels developed by Fisher during Miami Beach's expansion in the 1920s. Its location on Biscayne Bay allowed the resort to incorporate recreational facilities and water access into its grounds. A polo field was located near the hotel, reflecting Fisher's efforts to make Miami Beach a destination for wealthy visitors and sporting activities.

=== Military hospital ===
After 18 years, the Nautilus ceased operating as a luxury hotel during World War II when the property was taken over for use as a military hospital. It was subsequently used as a veterans' hospital after the war.

The Veterans Administration later moved its hospital operations elsewhere, leaving the Nautilus property available for redevelopment. The City of Miami Beach subsequently transferred the property to Mount Sinai Hospital of Greater Miami.

=== Mount Sinai Hospital and demolition ===
Mount Sinai Hospital of Greater Miami opened at the former Nautilus site on December 4, 1949. The hospital extensively renovated the property while continuing to use the existing Nautilus structure. As the medical center expanded, the original hotel building was demolished in 1968 to make way for new medical facilities. The site subsequently became part of the Mount Sinai Medical Center campus.

== Architecture ==
The Nautilus was a six-story Mediterranean-style hotel designed by Schultze & Weaver. The building was identified by the City of Miami Beach as an example of the Spanish and Mediterranean architecture that characterized Miami Beach hotel construction during the 1920s.

== See also ==
- Carl G. Fisher
- Schultze & Weaver
- Miami Beach, Florida
- Mount Sinai Medical Center (Miami)
