= Western Coatings Symposium =

The Western Coatings Symposium and Show is a conference for professionals and businesses in the Western USA and Canada that formulate and manufacture paints and coatings.

The Western Coatings Symposium and Show is organized by the Los Angeles Society for Coatings Technology (LASCT), the Pacific Northwest Society for Coatings Technology (PNWSCT), the Golden Gate Society for Coatings Technology (GGSCT) and the Arizona Society for Coatings Technology (ASCT).

== History ==
The first event, titled the "Pacific Coast Production Clubs Symposium with Paint Materials and Equipment Show" was held at the Biltmore Hotel in Los Angeles in the spring of 1952. It was organised by the Golden Gate Paint and Varnish Production Club, the Los Angeles Paint and Varnish Production Club, and the Pacific Northwest Paint and Varnish Production Club.

The Western Coating Symposium was incorporated in 2006 and comprises the Los Angeles Society for Coatings Technology, the Pacific Northwest Society for Coatings Technology, the Golden Gate Society for Coatings Technology and the Arizona Society for Coatings Technology.
