= Atlanta Biltmore Hotel and Biltmore Apartments =

- U.S. National Register of Historic Places
- Atlanta Landmark Building
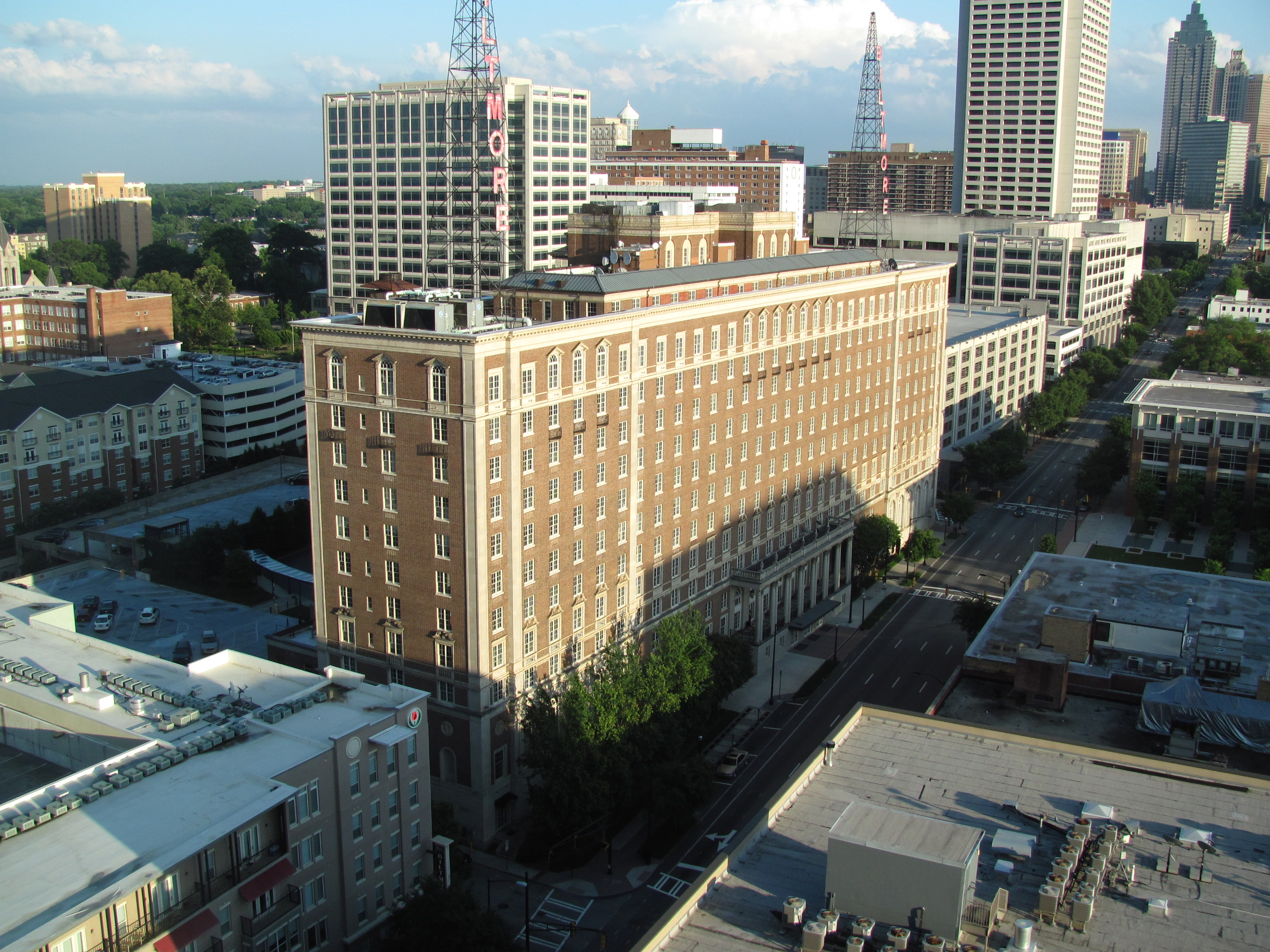

- Location within Atlanta Location within Georgia Location within the United States
- Location: 817 West Peachtree Street, Atlanta, Georgia
- Coordinates: 33°46′36″N 84°23′11″W
- Built: 1924
- Built by: Starrett Bros.
- Architect: Leonard Schultze
- Architectural style: Neo-Georgian, Colonial Revival
- NRHP reference No.: 80001071

Significant dates
- Added to NRHP: January 20, 1980
- Designated ALB: October 23, 1989

The Atlanta Biltmore Hotel and Biltmore Apartments is a historic building located in Atlanta, Georgia. The complex, originally consisting of a hotel and apartments, was developed by William Candler, son of Coca-Cola executive Asa Candler, with Holland Ball Judkins and John McEntee Bowman. The original hotel building was converted to an office building in 1999. The building is currently owned by the Georgia Institute of Technology and is adjacent to Technology Square.

== History ==
Advertisement from 'The Dixie Highway Magazine', May 1925.

Opened on April 19, 1924, the 11-story hotel and 10-story apartment building were constructed somewhat away from downtown Atlanta, in an area that became known as Midtown. Designed by the New York firm of Schultze and Weaver, the hotel was operated by Bowman-Biltmore Hotels.

The Atlanta Biltmore is easily distinguished by the towering radio masts on each end of the building, with vertical illuminated letters that spell out "BILTMORE". The studios on the top floor broadcast WSB-AM from 1925 until 1956. The large radio masts supported the transmitting antenna of WSB-AM from 1925 to 1929, when output power was increased to 5,000 watts, and a suburban transmitter site was built in East Lake.

In 1967, the Atlanta Biltmore was sold to Sheraton Hotels and became the Sheraton-Biltmore Hotel. Sheraton spent $5 million on renovations and operated the hotel until 1979, when they sold it to Biltmore Hospitality Partners, which renamed the hotel the Atlanta Biltmore. Both buildings were listed on the National Register of Historic Places on January 20, 1980. The hotel closed in 1982 and was sold in 1984 to Renaissance Investment Corporation, which planned to convert both the smaller apartment tower and the enormous hotel tower to condominiums. They completed work on the apartment tower, but then went bankrupt in 1986 and had to sell the entire property. The newly renovated apartment tower was opened as the Biltmore Suites Hotel while the main building remained vacant for many years.

The complex was sold to Novare Group in January 1998, who gutted and transformed the main hotel building into office space, reopening it in 1999. Due to extensive renovations over the years, there were only two remaining historic public rooms, the ballroom and dining room on the main floor. They were fully restored and are used as public function rooms, known as The Biltmore Ballrooms. The adjoining Biltmore Suites Hotel was closed in 1998 and converted to condominiums known as Biltmore House, which opened in 1999.

On June 13, 2016, The Biltmore was purchased from Novare by the Georgia Institute of Technology. In 2025, the school announced that they would relaunch the building as a hub for tech entrepreneur offices.

== Photo gallery ==
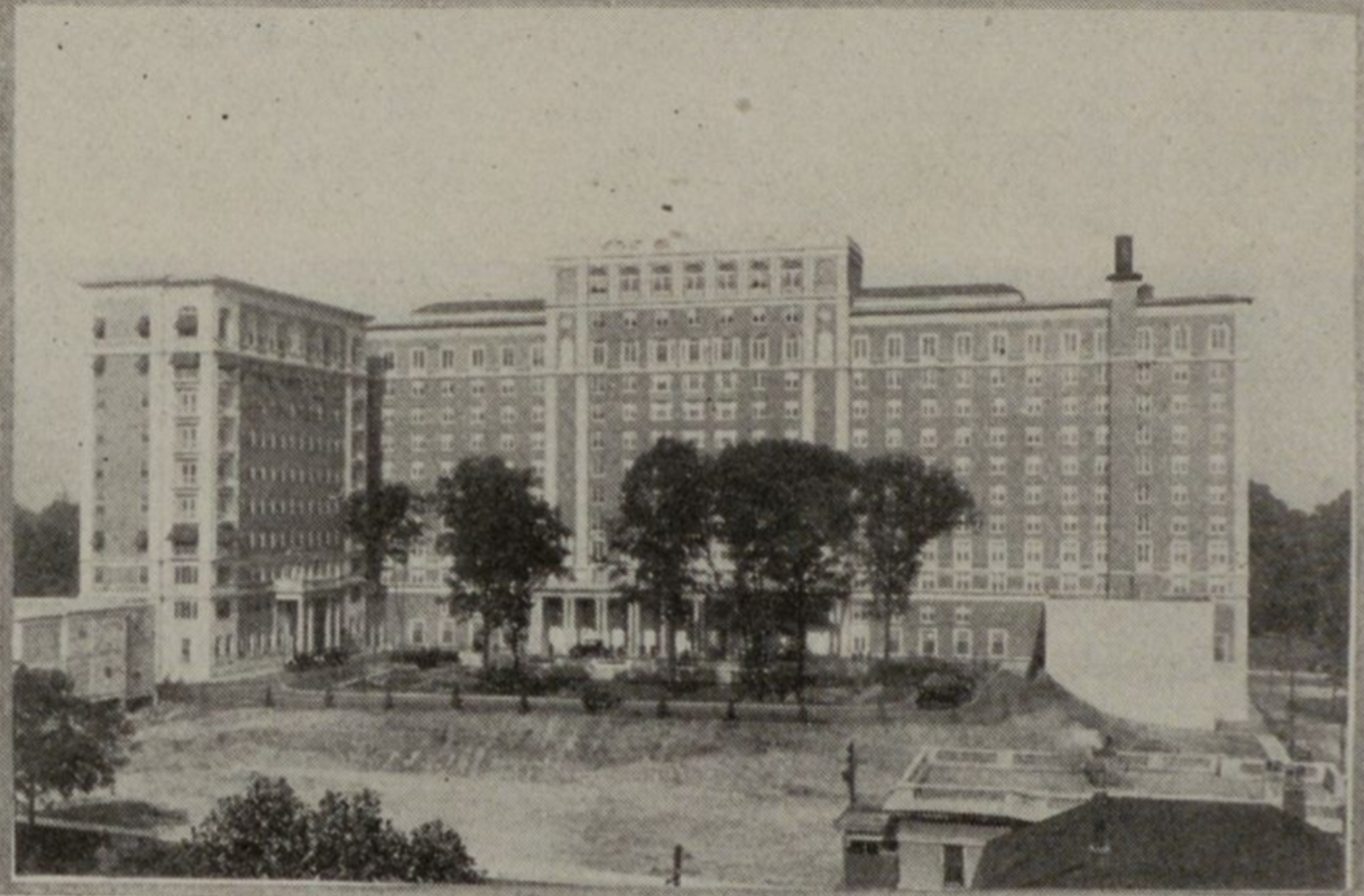
1926 view showing the main hotel building and the apartment tower on the left

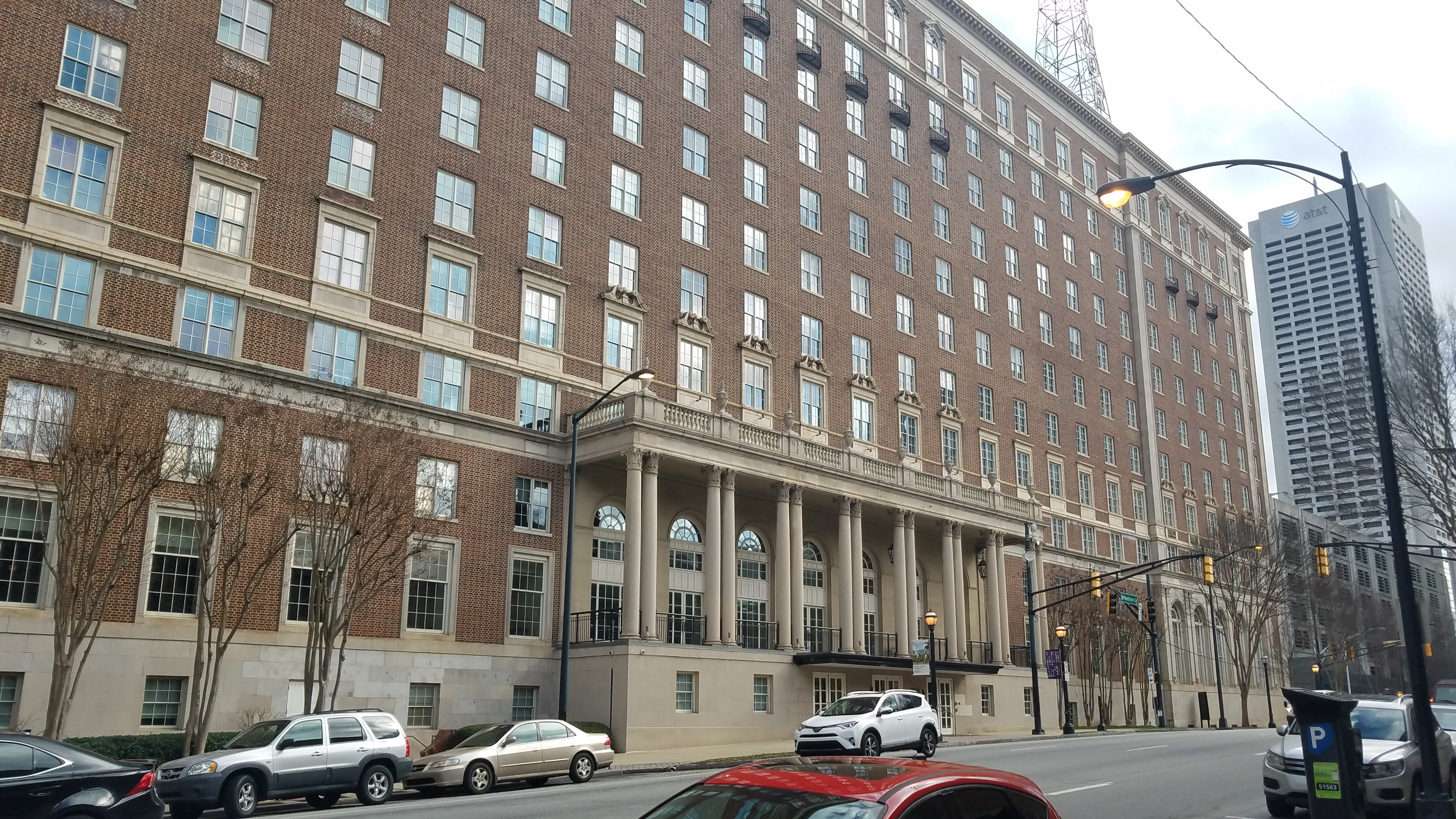
West Peachtree Street facade

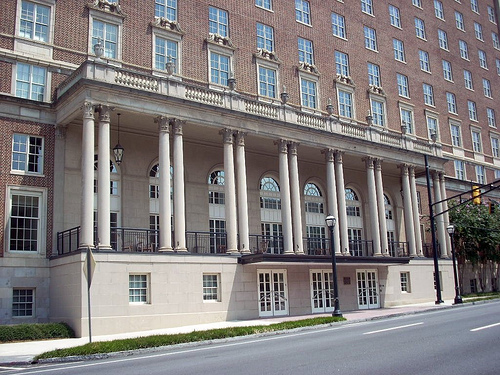
Portico on West Peachtree Street

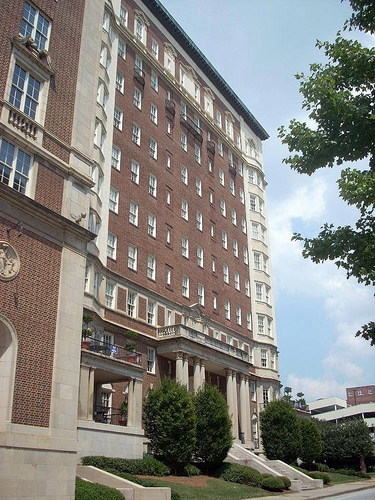
Biltmore House Condominiums

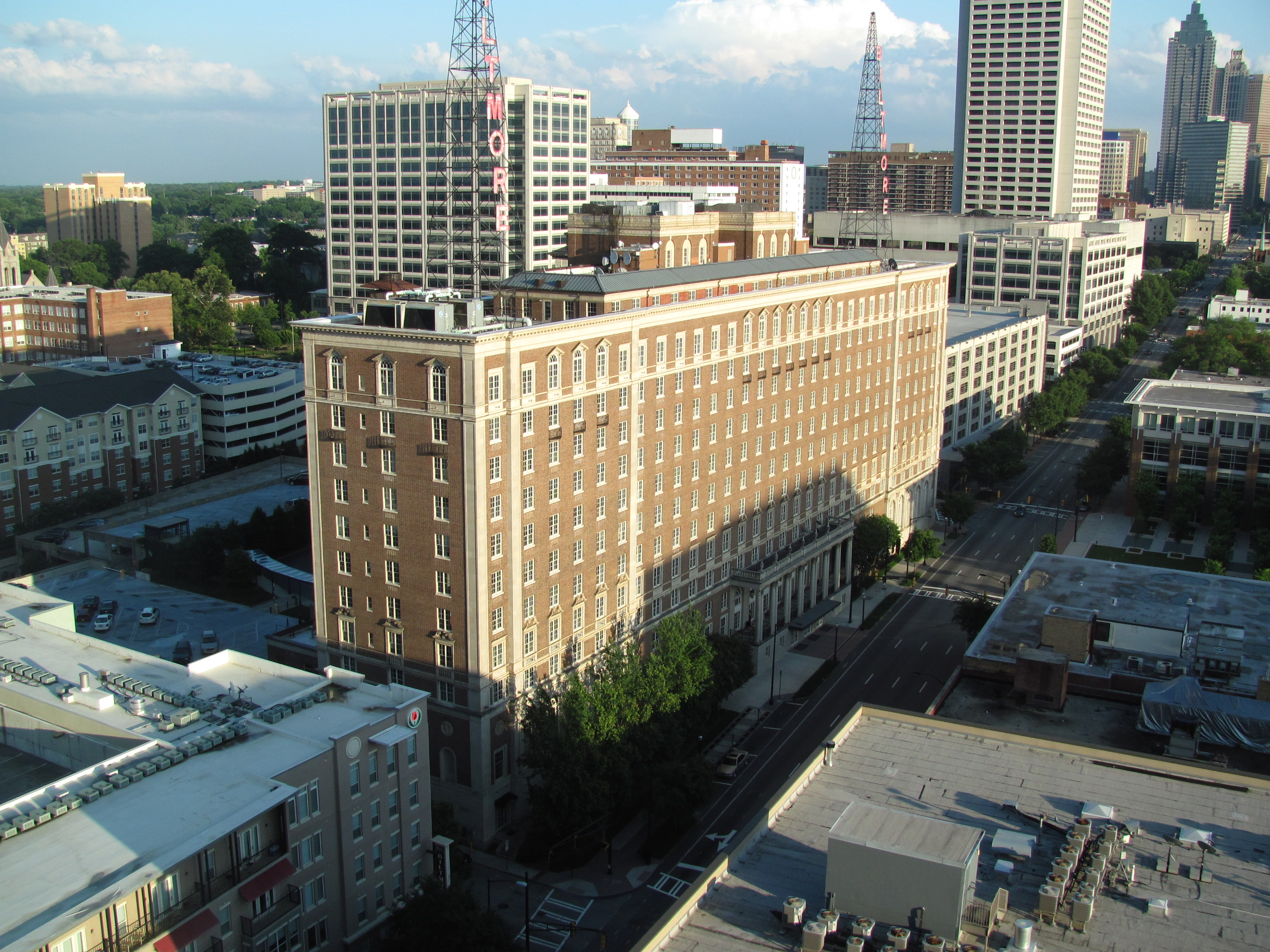
View from the Renaissance Hotel

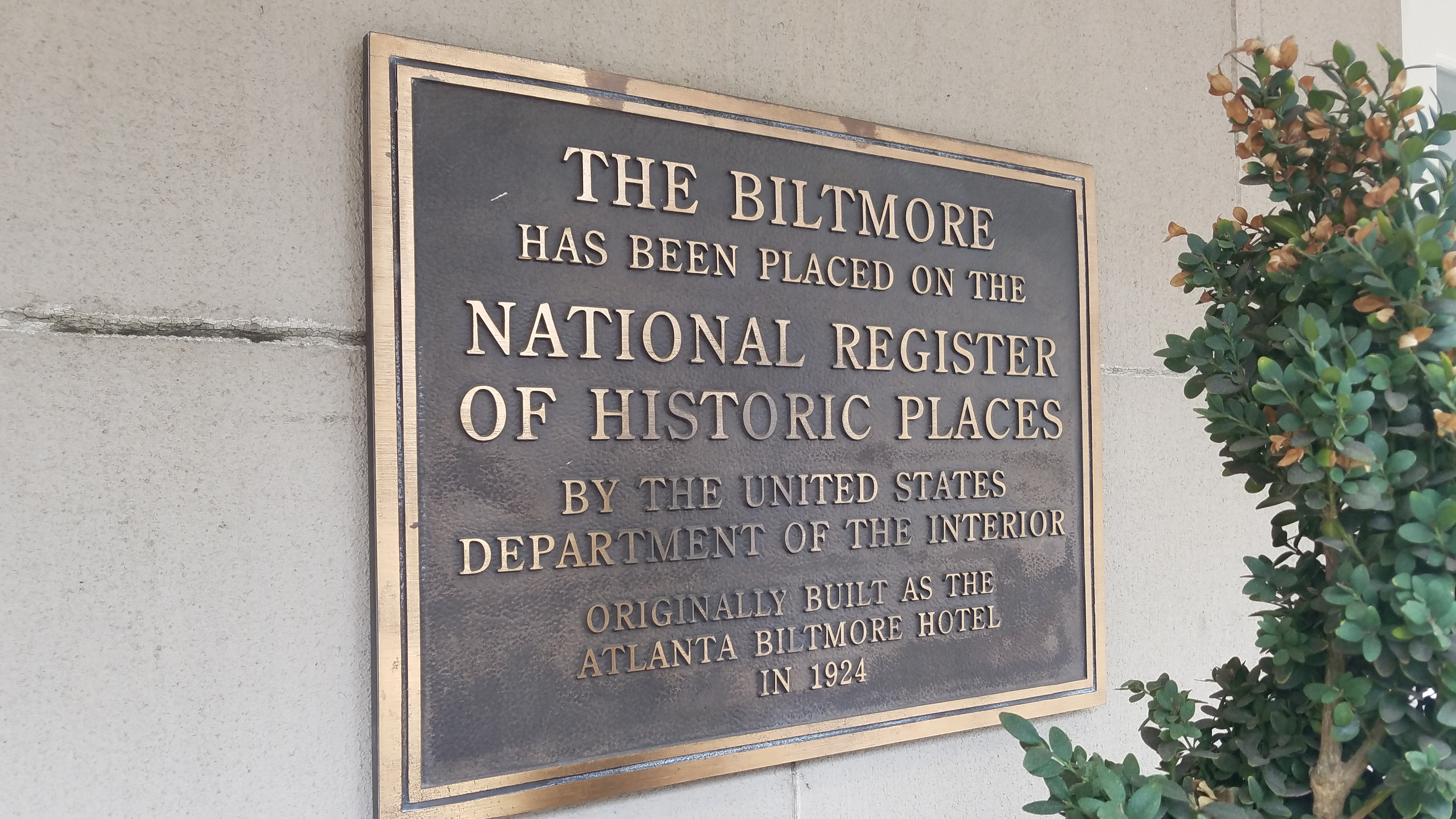
National Register of Historic Places plaque

== See also ==
- National Register of Historic Places listings in Fulton County, Georgia
- Hotels in Atlanta
