= Bank of America Building (Los Angeles) =

Building in Los Angeles, California

- U.S. Historic district – Contributing property
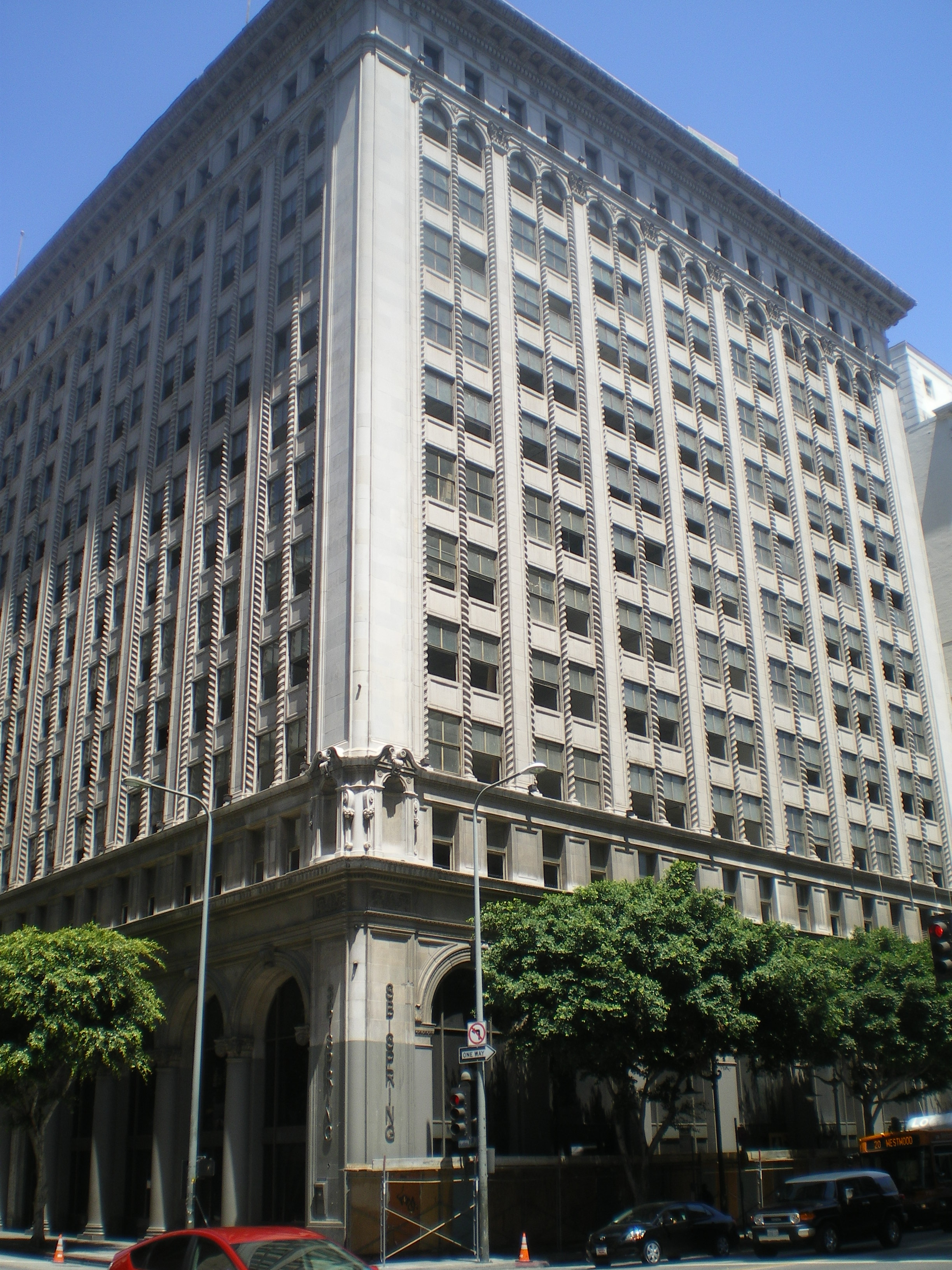
- The building in 2008

- Location within the Los Angeles metropolitan area
- Location: 650-660 S. Spring Street and 117 W. 7th Street, Los Angeles, California
- Coordinates: 34.0448°N 118.2518°W
- Built: 1924
- Architect: Schultze & Weaver
- Architectural style: Sullivanesque/Beaux Arts Revival
- Part of: Spring Street Financial District (ID79000489)
- Designated CP: August 10, 1979

Downtown Los Angeles's Bank of America Building, also known as Hellman Bank Building, Hellman Commercial Trust and Savings Bank Building, and SB Spring, is a historic building located at 650-660 S. Spring Street and 117 W. 7th Street in downtown Los Angeles, California. It is a contributing property in the Spring Street Financial District.

== History ==
Downtown Los Angeles's Bank of America Building was designed by Schultze & Weaver for Isaias Hellman and built for a reputed $2.5 million in 1924 ($47 million in 2025). The building housed the Los Angeles headquarters of Bank of America from 1930 to 1972.

In 1979, the Spring Street Financial District was added to the National Register of Historic Places, with Bank of America Building listed as a contributing property in the district. The building is also included in the City of Los Angeles-listed Seventh Street Commercial Historic District.

The building's bank lobby was completely vacated in 1988. Residential real estate developer Barry Shy bought this building and two others for $75 million in 2006 ($120 million in 2025). This building was converted to 174 apartments and renamed SB Spring; the bank lobby was converted to an event space. In 2022, this building was one of five downtown Los Angeles residential buildings bought by Laguna Point Properties for $402 million ($442 million in 2025). All five buildings were previously owned by DTLA Management.

== Architecture and design ==
Downtown Los Angeles's Bank of America Building is twelve stories in height and was designed in a Sullivanesque/Beaux Arts Revival style. It is made of steel-reinforced concrete and faced with terra cotta and Indian limestone. The ground floor features four ionic columns.

The building's banking area features Spanish Revival marble, wood, and metal detailing, and the bank lobby features vaulted ceilings. The top floor originally contained a conference room, but its historic features were destroyed when the building was converted to residential; the room itself was converted to a rental unit.

== Filming location ==
Since Bank of America vacated the building, several films have shot in the building's bank lobby, including Traffic, Seven, and Blow. The building is often used to build sets and for backdrops.

== See also ==
- List of contributing properties in the Spring Street Financial District
