= Hotel Sevilla =

Historic hotel in Havana, Cuba

Coordinates: 23.1404°N 82.3583°W

Hotel Sevilla Habana
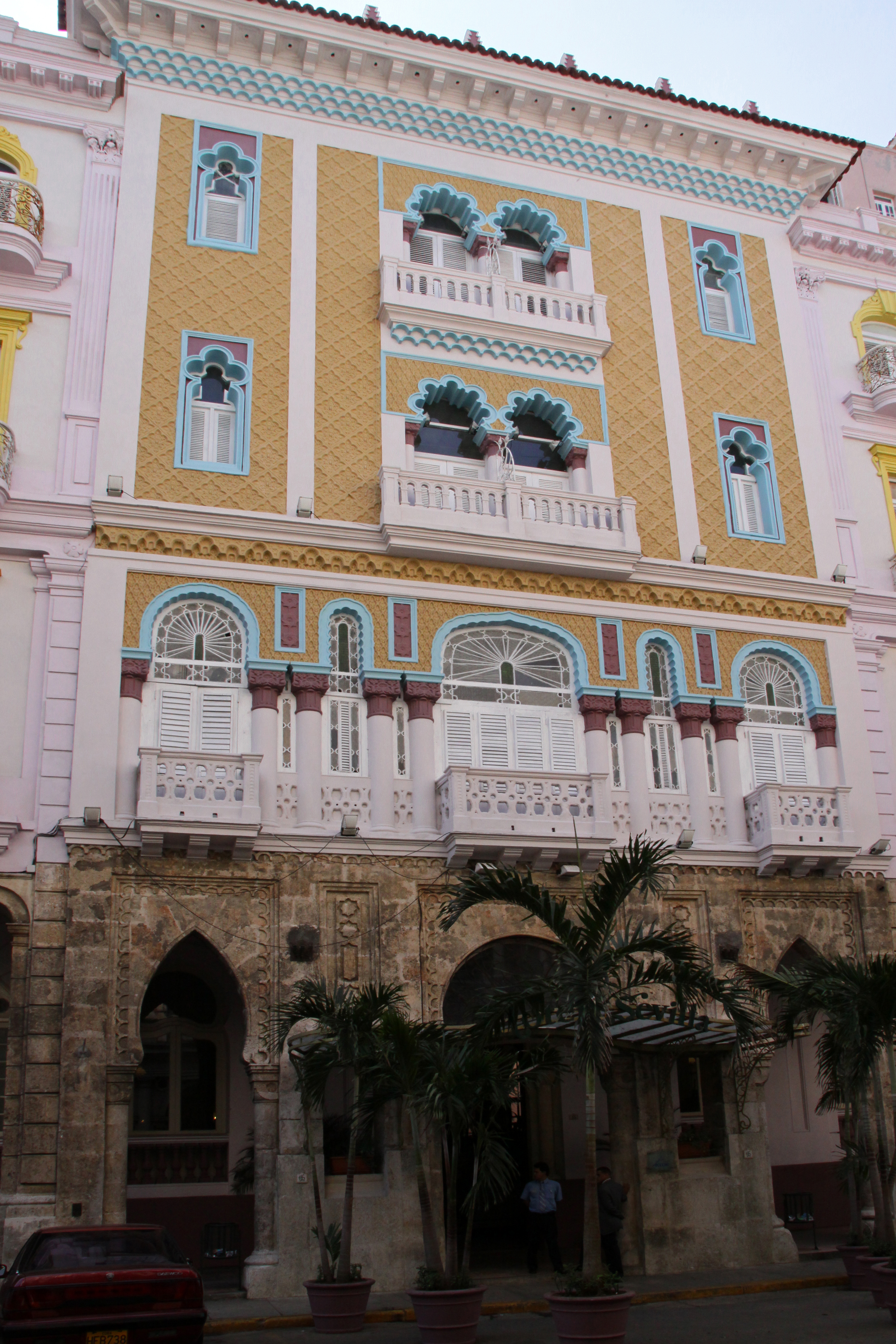
- Original 1908 wing of Hotel Sevilla
- Interactive map of the Hotel Sevilla Habana area

General information
- Location: Calle Trocadero #55, Entre Prado y Zulueta; Havana, Cuba
- Opening: March 22, 1908
- Owner: Gran Caribe

Technical details
- Floor count: 10

Design and construction
- Architects: José Troya, Antonio Rodríguez and José Rodríguez, Schultze & Weaver

Other information
- Number of rooms: 178

The Hotel Sevilla Habana is a historic hotel in Havana, Cuba.

== History ==
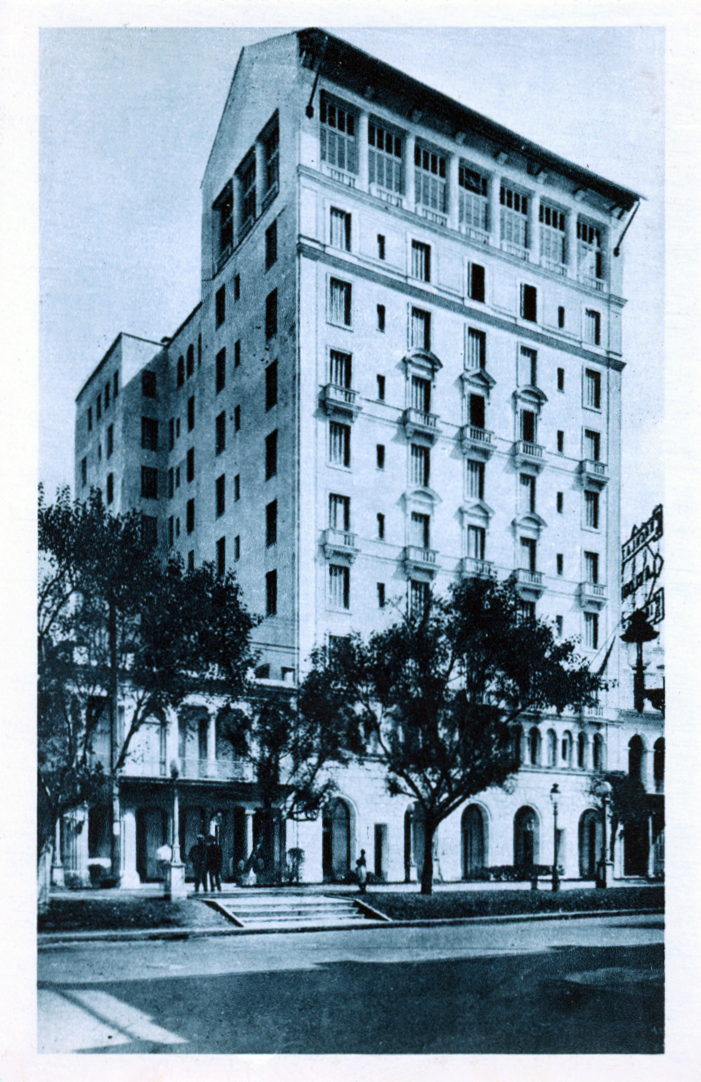
The 1924 tower wing of the Hotel Sevilla-Biltmore, 1925

The Hotel Sevilla opened on March 22, 1908. It was a four-story Moorish Revival structure, designed by architects Arellano y Mendoza on, located on Calle Trocadero, next to the Paseo del Prado, between the Malecón and Parque Central. The Sevilla was bought by John McEntee Bowman and Charles Francis Flynn in 1919 and renamed the Hotel Sevilla-Biltmore. In 1924, Bowman-Biltmore Hotels constructed a huge ten-story tower wing, with a rooftop ballroom, designed by noted New York architects Schultze & Weaver.

In the 1920s the Chicago gangster Al Capone stayed there, booking the entire sixth floor of the hotel. In 1939, the Sevilla-Biltmore was purchased by Italian-Uruguayan mobster Amleto Battisti y Lora. Under Battisti the hotel was used for narcotics trafficking. Cocaine shipments arrived there on a weekly basis from Madrid via a commercial airliner, while marijuana and cocaine were sold at the Longchamps Restaurant in the Hotel Sevilla Arcade, selling at a price between fifteen and fifty dollars per gram. Its casino was closely associated with Havana's mafia network, being part-owned by Santo Trafficante, Jr. Mobs destroyed the Sevilla-Biltmore's casino on January 1, 1959, after Fulgencio Batista fled the country overnight as Fidel Castro's rebel army approached Havana. Amleto Battisti took refuge in the Uruguayan embassy.

Today, the hotel is owned by the Cuban state-run Gran Caribe hotel group. The French Accor chain assumed management in 1996, first under their Sofitel division as the Hotel Sofitel Sevilla Havana, and later under their Mercure Hotels division as the Hotel Mercure Sevilla Havane. Accor announced plans in 2017 to renovate the Sevilla and transfer it to their boutique MGallery by Sofitel division. However, Accor ceased management of the hotel on December 31, 2018.

In 2023, the hotel joined the Spanish Meliá Hotels International chain as Hotel Sevilla Habana Affiliated by Meliá. In 2026, Meliá ceased all operations in Cuba.

== In popular culture ==
The hotel is mentioned in The Godfather Part II, at a meeting between the main mafia bosses in Havana, itself a reference to the Havana Conference. The Sevilla-Biltmore was featured in Graham Greene's novel Our Man in Havana as the location where the protagonist joins the British secret service.

== See also ==
- List of buildings in Havana
