= United States Post Office (Scarsdale, New York) =

- US Post Office-Scarsdale
- U.S. National Register of Historic Places
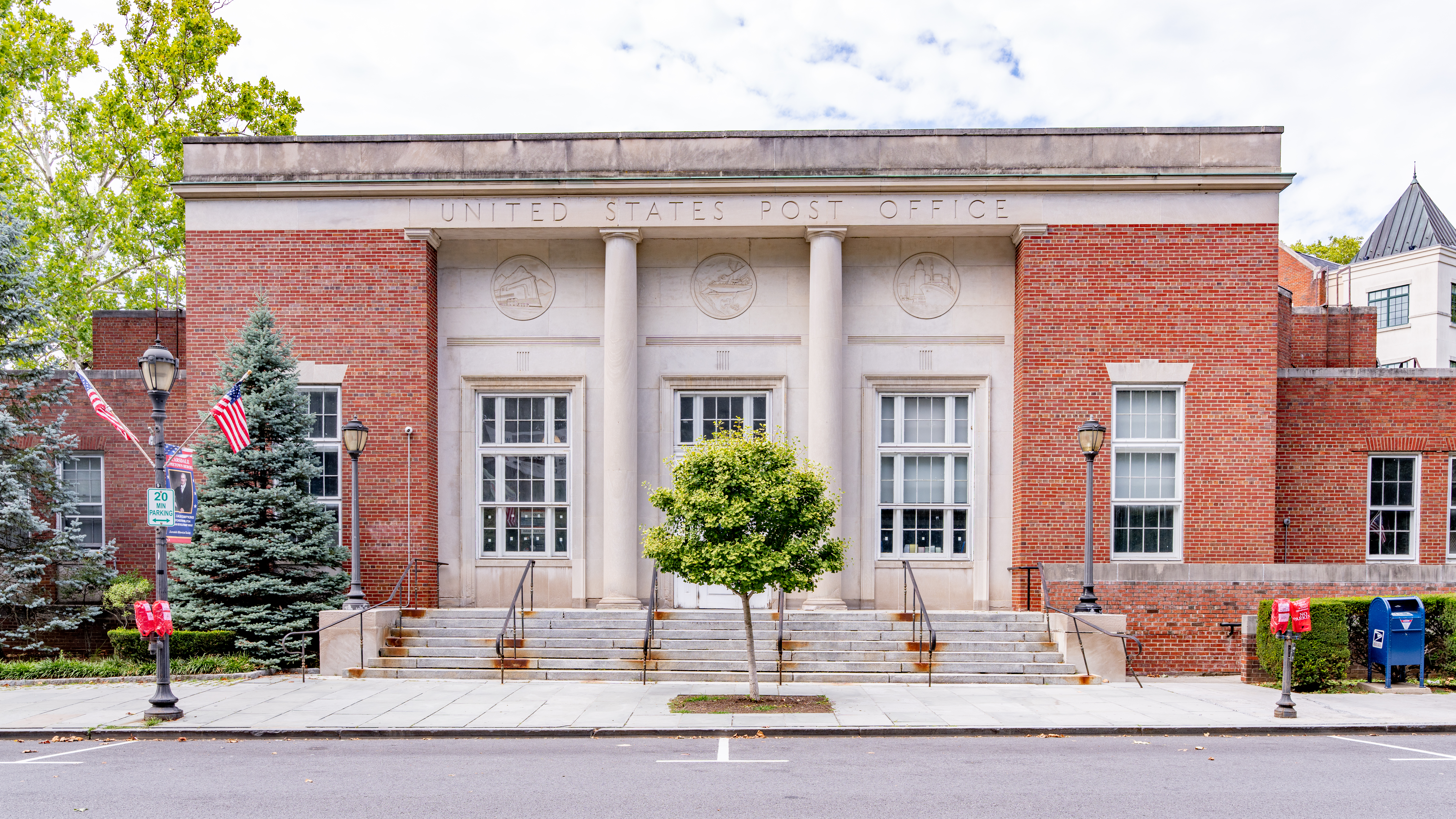
- (2025)

- Location within New York Location within the United States
- Interactive map showing the location for U.S. Post Office-Scarsdale
- Location: 29 Chase Rd., Scarsdale, New York
- Coordinates: 40.9900°N 73.8062°W
- Area: less than one acre
- Built: 1937
- Architect: Schultze & Weaver, Gordon Samstag
- Architectural style: Classical Revival
- MPS: US Post Offices in New York State, 1858-1943, TR
- NRHP reference No.: 88002428
- Added to NRHP: May 11, 1989

US Post Office-Scarsdale is a historic post office building located at Scarsdale in Westchester County, New York, United States. It was built in 1937 and designed by consulting architects Schultze and Weaver for the Office of the Supervising Architect. It is a symmetrically massed red brick building containing limestone trim in the Classical Revival style. It is composed of a two-story central section with flanking one story wings. The front facade features a three-bay recessed limestone portico supported by a pair of tall slender Doric order columns. The lobby features two murals by Gordon Samstag titled "Law and Order in Old Scarsdale" and "Caleb Heathcote Buys the Richbell Farm."

It was listed on the National Register of Historic Places in 1989.

== See also ==
- National Register of Historic Places listings in southern Westchester County, New York
