= Hunter–Dulin Building =

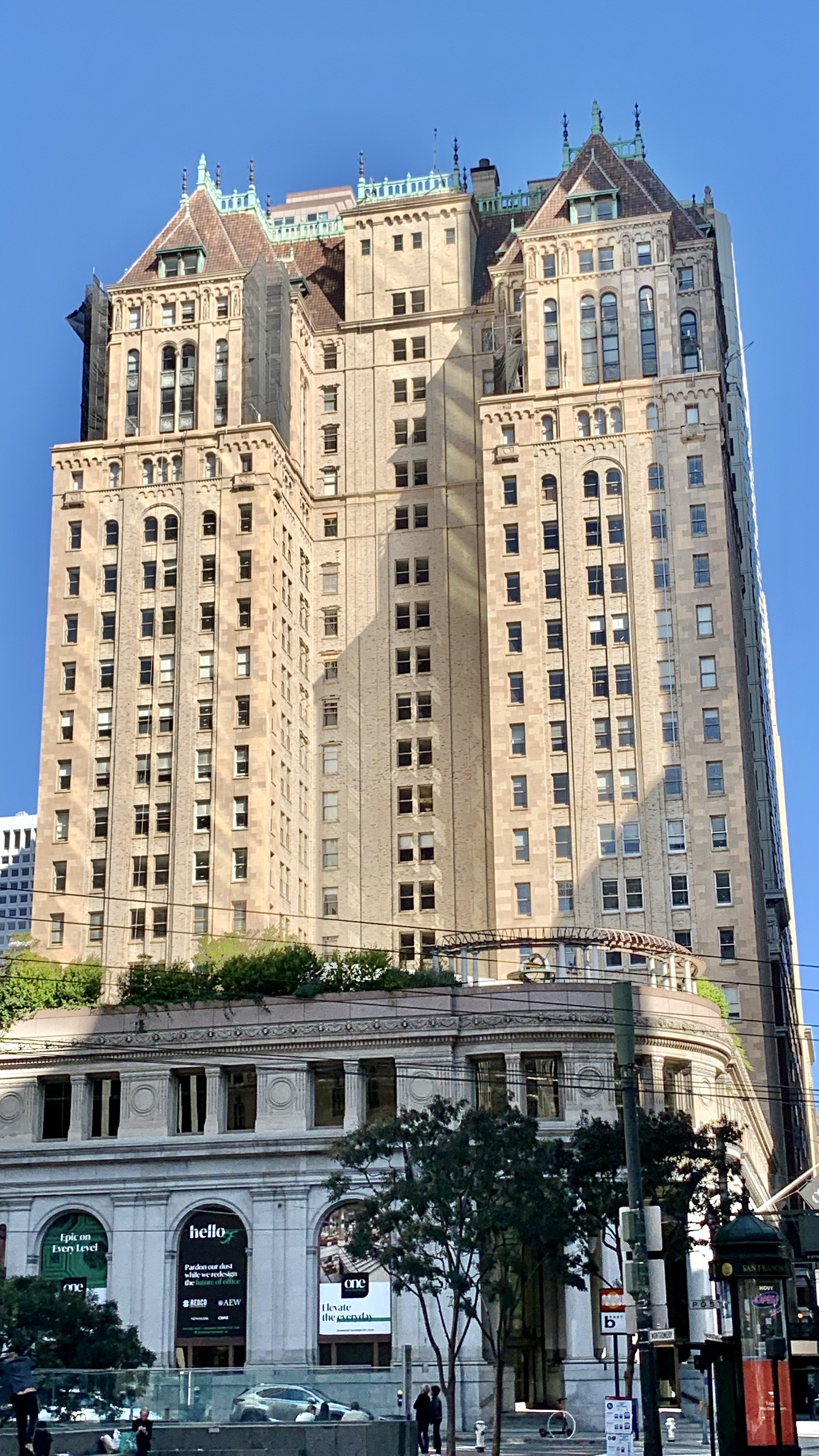
- from Market Street (2021)

General information
- Type: Commercial offices
- Location: 111 Sutter St., San Francisco, California
- Coordinates: 37.7898°N 122.4025°W
- Construction started: 1925
- Completed: 1927

Height
- Roof: 93.88 m (308.0 ft)

Technical details
- Floor count: 22
- Floor area: 285,093 sq ft (26,486.0 m^{2})

Design and construction
- Architects: Schultze & Weaver; Garcia/Wagner & Associates
- Structural engineer: H. J. Brunnier
- Hunter–Dulin Building
- U.S. National Register of Historic Places
- Area: less than one acre
- Architectural style: Late Gothic Revival, French Renaissance Revival
- NRHP reference No.: 97000348
- Added to NRHP: April 17, 1997

The Hunter–Dulin Building (also known as the California Commercial Wool Building or 111 Sutter Street) is a class A office building located at 111 Sutter Street in Downtown San Francisco, California.

== Description and history ==
The 25-story, 94 m (308 ft) tall building was completed in 1927. It was listed on the National Register of Historic Places on April 17, 1997. The building was totally restored and renovated between 1999 and 2001.

The building served as the West Coast headquarters for the National Broadcasting Company from 1927 to 1942; the executive offices were located on the 21st floor and the studio offices were located on the 22nd. The 22nd floor was later occupied by peer-to-peer lending firm Prosper Marketplace.

111 Sutter Street was the fictional location of the "Spade & Archer" detective agency in Dashiell Hammett's 1930 book, "The Maltese Falcon". According to Hammett, Sam Spade's office was located on the 5th floor.

As of May 2023, during what the San Francisco Chronicle described as the neighborhood's "worst office vacancy crisis on record", 111 Sutter Street had a vacancy rate of 43.9%.

== See also ==
- National Register of Historic Places listings in San Francisco
