= Waikiki Biltmore Hotel =

Former hotel in Hawaii

- Interactive map of the Waikiki Biltmore Hotel area

General information
- Location: 2424 Kalākaua Avenue, Honolulu, Hawaiʻi, United States
- Coordinates: 21°16′34″N 157°49′31″W
- Groundbreaking: November 1953
- Opened: February 19, 1955
- Demolished: May 28, 1974
- Cost: $4,000,000

Technical details
- Floor count: 11
- Lifts/elevators: 3

Design and construction
- Architects: D.N. Ivanitsky and R.G. Waanabe
- Developer: Joseph Greenbach
- Main contractor: Sawai Brothers

Other information
- Number of rooms: 274
- Parking: underground

The Waikiki Biltmore Hotel was a resort hotel in Waikīkī, Honolulu, Hawaiʻi, that operated from 1955 to 1974. The Biltmore was the first high-rise hotel on Waikīkī but operated for only 19 years, after which it was demolished and replaced with the Hyatt Regency.

== History ==
Permits were filed for an eight-story hotel in March 1953, with groundbreaking taking place in November of that year. Joseph Greenbach constructed the building, which opened on February 19, 1955. Construction cost $4 million. The hotel was built on the site of Canlis Charcoal Broiler, the first restaurant opened by Peter Canlis, which opened in 1947. The opening was met with great fanfare, including a flight from California chartered by Greenbach.

The hotel opened with 247 rooms, featuring amenities such as the Top of the Isle club on the 11th floor, the Kiki Room, and the Luau Lounge. D.N. Ivanitsky and R.G. Wanabe were the architects of record.

In late 1955, Greenbach sold the hotel to Massaglia Hotels, Inc.

The hotel was sold again to the Kimi chain, operator of the Hukilau hotels, in 1966 for $2.5 million. The Kimi owners spent $100,000 on a renovation, but a planned renaming never occurred.

In 1973, a man fired a shot at a woman sitting at an adjacent hotel from a room at the Biltmore.

The hotel suffered a small fire on the 10th floor in August 1973 caused by a discarded cigarette, and a larger fire in November 1973 that destroyed the second-story Port O' Paradise nightclub.

== Closure and demolition ==
The King's Alley shopping center opened near the hotel in 1972, and after the hotel's purchase by developer Christopher Hemmeter there were plans to renovate the hotel as part of a $20 million area rejuvenation. In 1973, the hotel began offering monthly rentals due to an oversupply of hotel rooms. By 1974, the plans had changed to redevelop the hotel as two 40-story towers, which became the Hyatt Regency.

The hotel was imploded at 8 a.m. on May 28, 1974.
