= Miami Biltmore Hotel =

- Miami-Biltmore Hotel & Country Club
- U.S. National Register of Historic Places
- U.S. National Historic Landmark
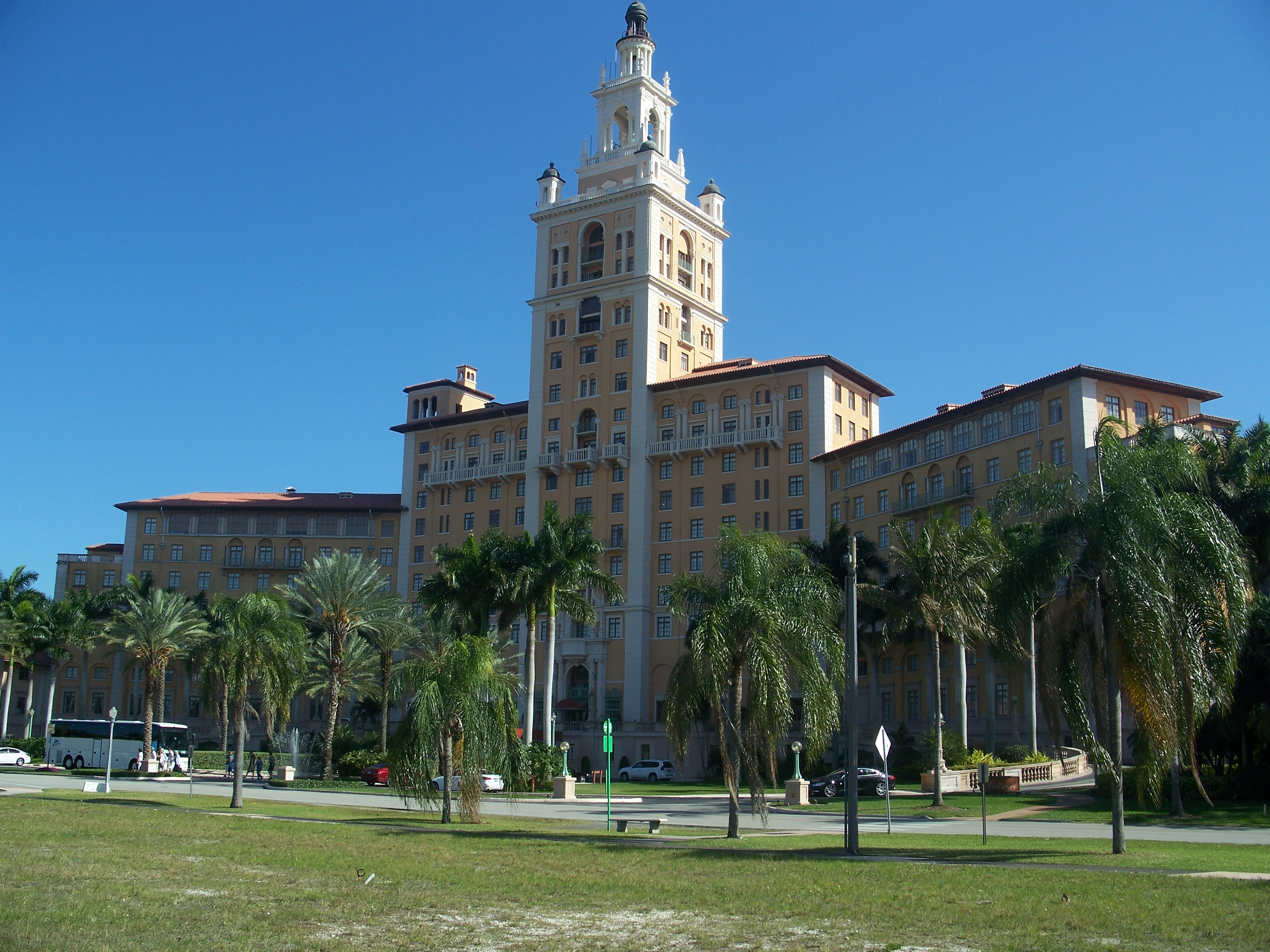
- Miami Biltmore Hotel in Coral Gables, Florida, March 2011

- Location within Miami Location within Florida Location within the United States
- Location: Coral Gables, Florida, U.S.
- Coordinates: 25°44′28″N 80°16′45″W
- Built: 1926
- Architect: Schultze and Weaver
- Architectural style: Mission/Spanish Revival/Italian Renaissance
- NRHP reference No.: 72000306

Significant dates
- Added to NRHP: September 27, 1972
- Designated NHL: June 19, 1996

The Miami Biltmore Hotel, commonly called The Biltmore Hotel or The Biltmore, is a luxury hotel in Coral Gables, Florida. The hotel was designed by Schultze and Weaver and built in 1926 by John McEntee Bowman and George Merrick as part of the Biltmore hotel chain. The hotel's tower is inspired by the Giralda, the medieval tower of the cathedral of Seville.

When completed in 1926, the Biltmore became the tallest building in Florida at 315 feet (96 m), holding the record as Florida's tallest building until 1928 when the Dade County Courthouse was built. At one time, the pool was the largest pool in the world and employed swimming instructor (and later Tarzan actor) Johnny Weissmuller. It served as a hospital during World War II and as a Veterans Administration Hospital and campus of the University of Miami medical school until 1968. The hotel was then abandoned for many years before again resuming operations as a hotel in 1987.

In 1986, Miami Biltmore Hotel was designated a National Historic Landmark.

== History ==
=== 20th century ===
In 1925, land developer George E. Merrick joined forces with Bowman-Biltmore Hotels president John McEntee Bowman at the height of the Florida land boom to build "a great hotel...which would not only serve as a hostelry to the crowds which were thronging to Coral Gables but also would serve as a center of sports and fashion." In January 1926, after ten months of construction at a cost of $10 million, the hotel debuted with an inaugural that brought people down from northern cities on trains marked "Miami Biltmore Specials."

Visitors included the Duke and Duchess of Windsor, Ginger Rogers, Judy Garland, Bing Crosby, Al Capone, and assorted Roosevelts and Vanderbilts as frequent guests. Franklin D. Roosevelt had a temporary White House office set up at the Hotel when he vacationed in Miami.

Just months after the hotel opened, on September 18, the 1926 Miami Hurricane struck. While the hotel was undamaged, providing shelter for over 2,000 survivors, the disaster signaled the end of the Florida land boom.

Merrick's Coral Gables company declared bankruptcy on April 13, 1929, and Merrick's stake in the hotel was bought out by his partner, John McEntee Bowman in November 1929 for $2.1 million. Bowman resold the hotel in September 1931 to millionaire Henry Latham Doherty. A large part of the hotel's revenue in the 1930s came from aquatic galas. As many as 3,000 people would come out to watch the synchronized swimmers, bathing beauties, and alligator wrestling. Johnny Weissmuller, before he was known for his role in Tarzan, broke a world record at the pool.

With the onset of World War II, the War Department took over the hotel, converting it to a 1,200-bed hospital in November 1942. The building was transferred to the Army in 1946 and renamed Pratt General Hospital. Many of the windows were sealed with concrete, and the marble floors covered with government-issue linoleum. The hospital was transferred from the Army to the Veterans Administration (VA) in July 1947. Also the early site of The University of Miami's School of Medicine, Pratt General Hospital remained a VA hospital, with 450 beds, until a newer facility opened nearby in May 1968 and the building was vacated.

In 1973, through the Historic Monuments Act and Legacy of Parks program, the City of Coral Gables was granted ownership control. The building remained unoccupied for almost 10 years. Then in 1983, the City oversaw its full restoration to be opened as a grand hotel. It was reopened on December 31, 1987 as a luxury hotel and resort.

In June 1992, a multinational consortium led by Seaway Hotels Corporation became the new operators of the hotel under a long term management lease with the City of Coral Gables, and again made extensive refurbishments to the property. New lighting and telephone systems, repairs to the pool, furnishings, a complete guestroom renovation program and spa were completed.

=== 21st century ===
In February 2009, the hotel opened the Biltmore Culinary Academy, a recreational hands-on cooking school with classes for adults and children taught by the hotel's chefs.

On April 18, 2012, the AIA's Florida Chapter placed the building on its list of "Florida Architecture, 100 Years, 100 Places."

== In popular culture ==
The hotel has been used as a setting in various movies and television programs, including Bad Boys, The Specialist, Shock Waves, CSI: Miami, Popi, and Miami Vice.

== Golf ==
The hotel has an 18-hole, par 71, championship course designed by Donald Ross. Reopened in November 2007, following a $5 million investment, the course was restored and updated by Brian Silva. The original 1925 routing was retained, but all greens, tees, and bunkers were reconstructed and grassed to contemporary standards. The property again contracted Silva to provide additional improvements to the golf course in the summer of 2018.

The course annually hosts the Junior Orange Bowl International Golf Championship.

== Spa ==
The hotel has a 12,000-square-foot (1,100 m^{2}) full-service spa which is a member of the Leading Spas of the World.

== Gallery ==
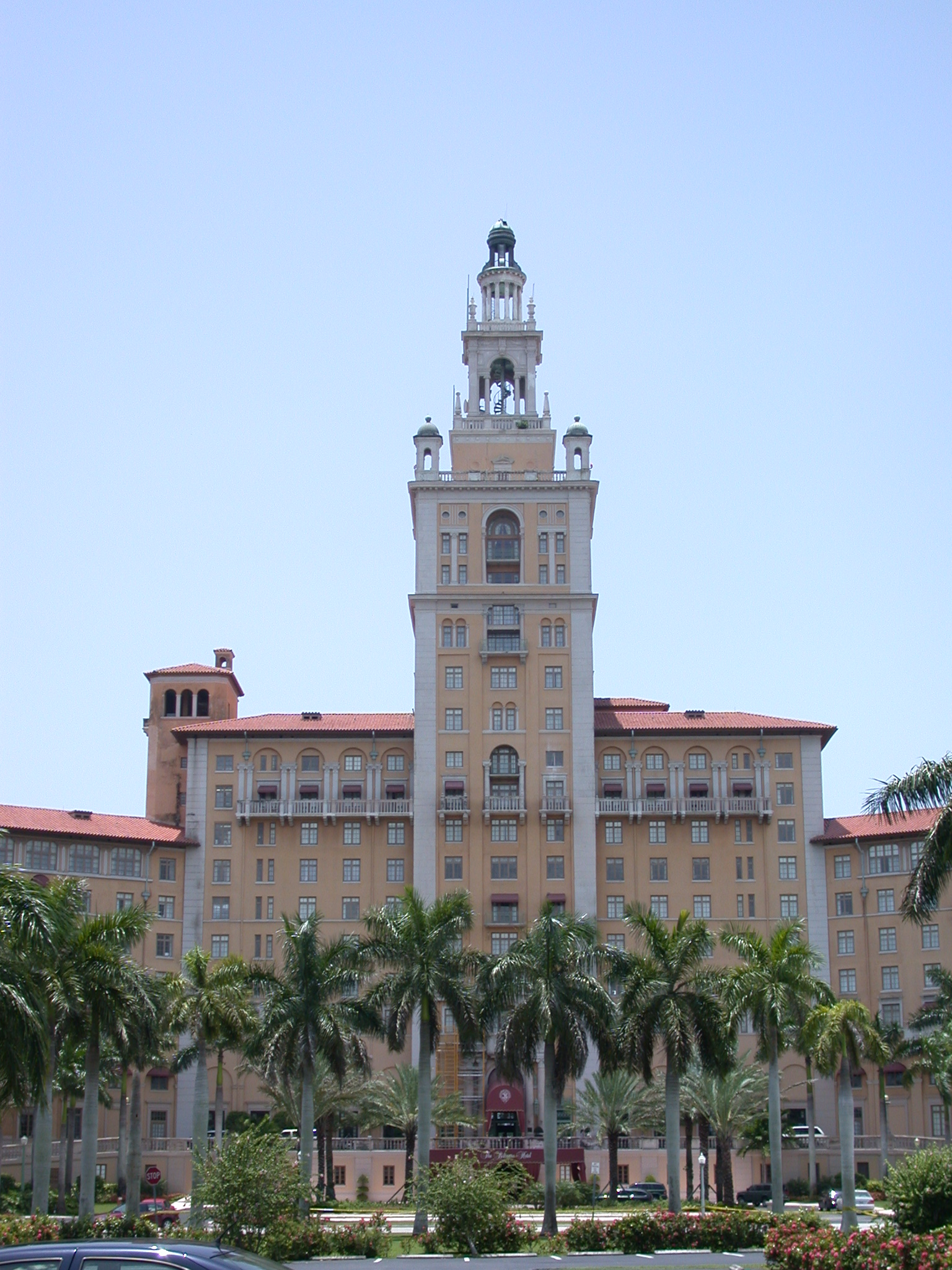
Front of hotel

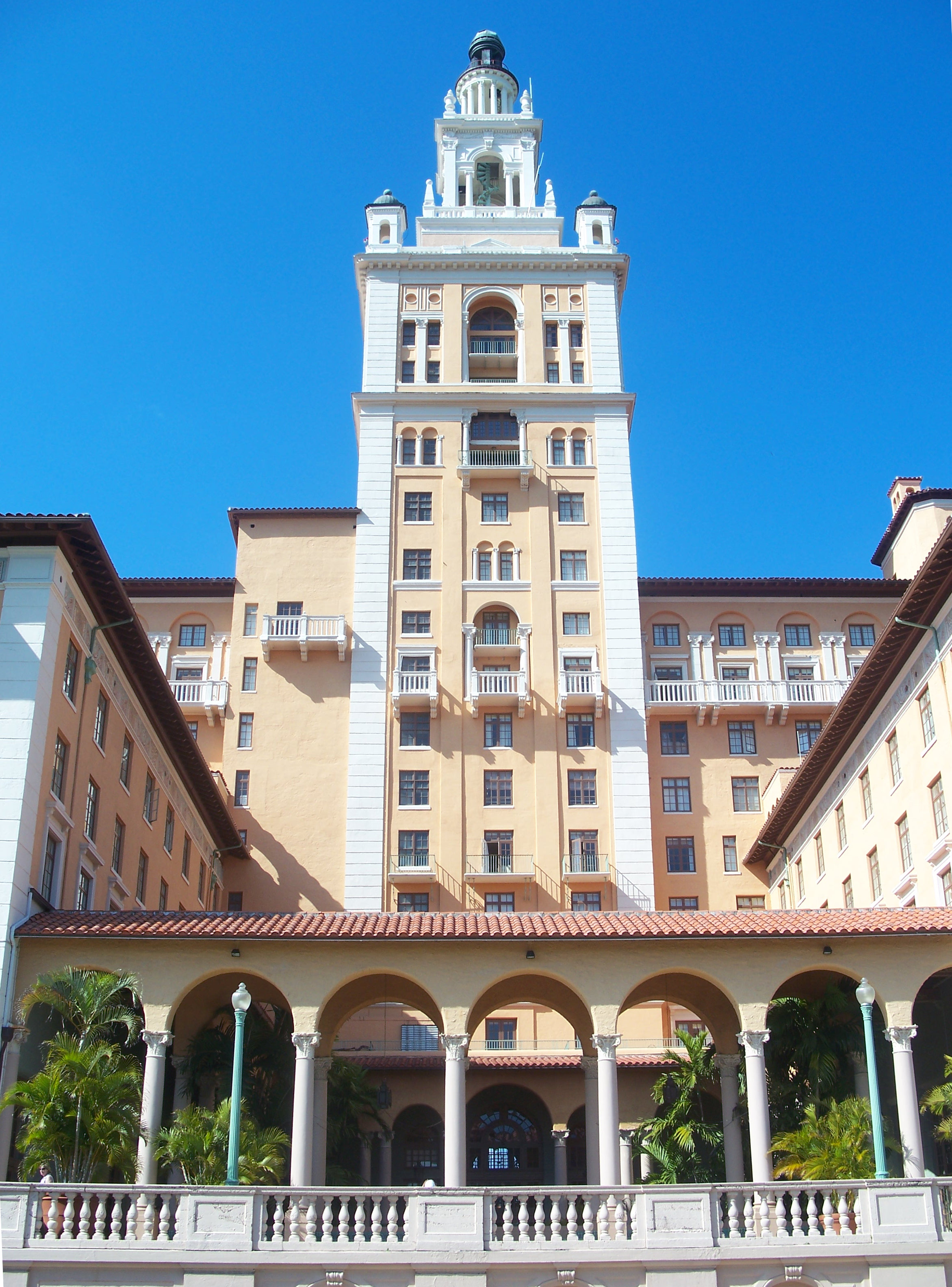
Rear view

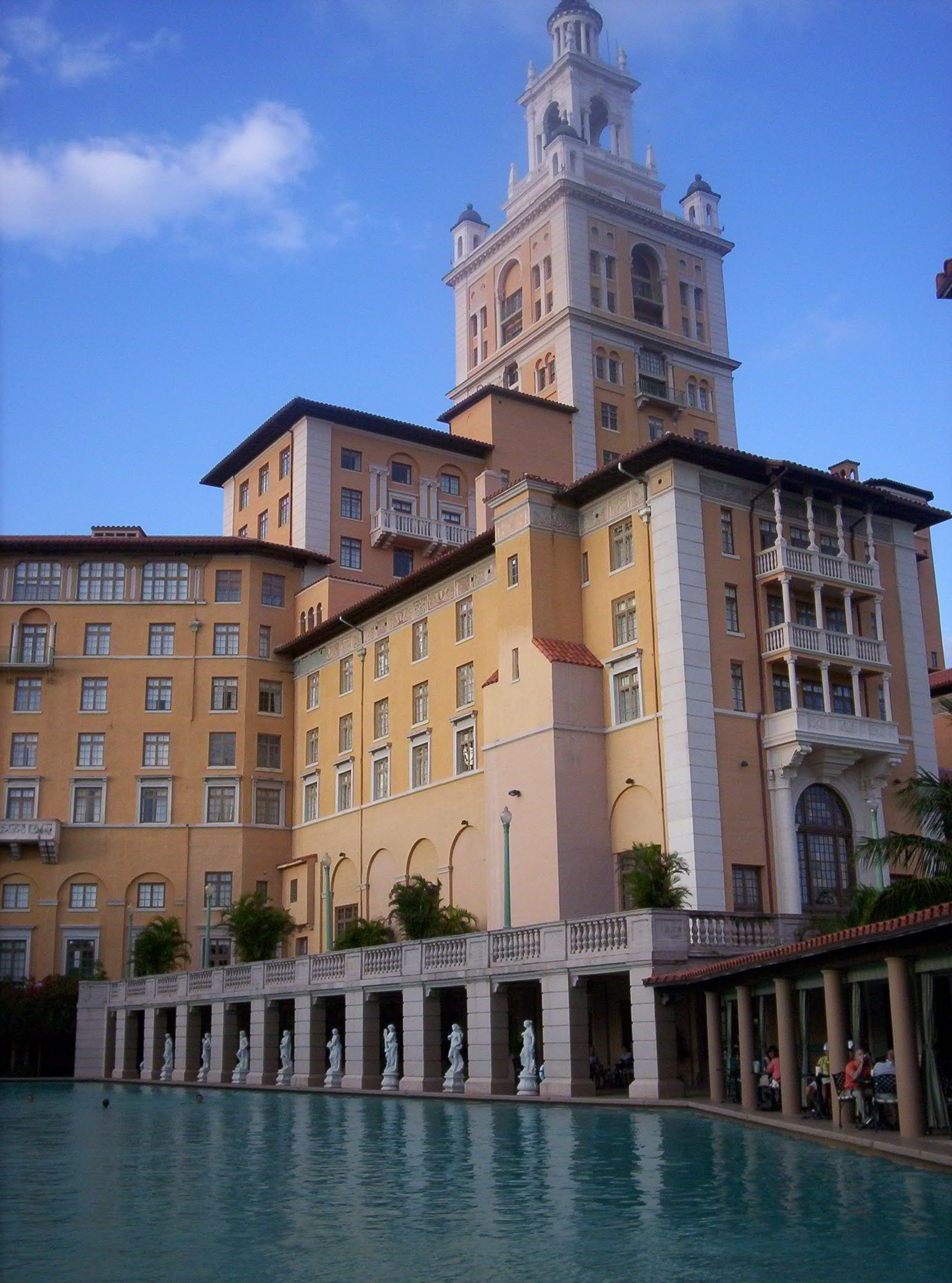
Pool

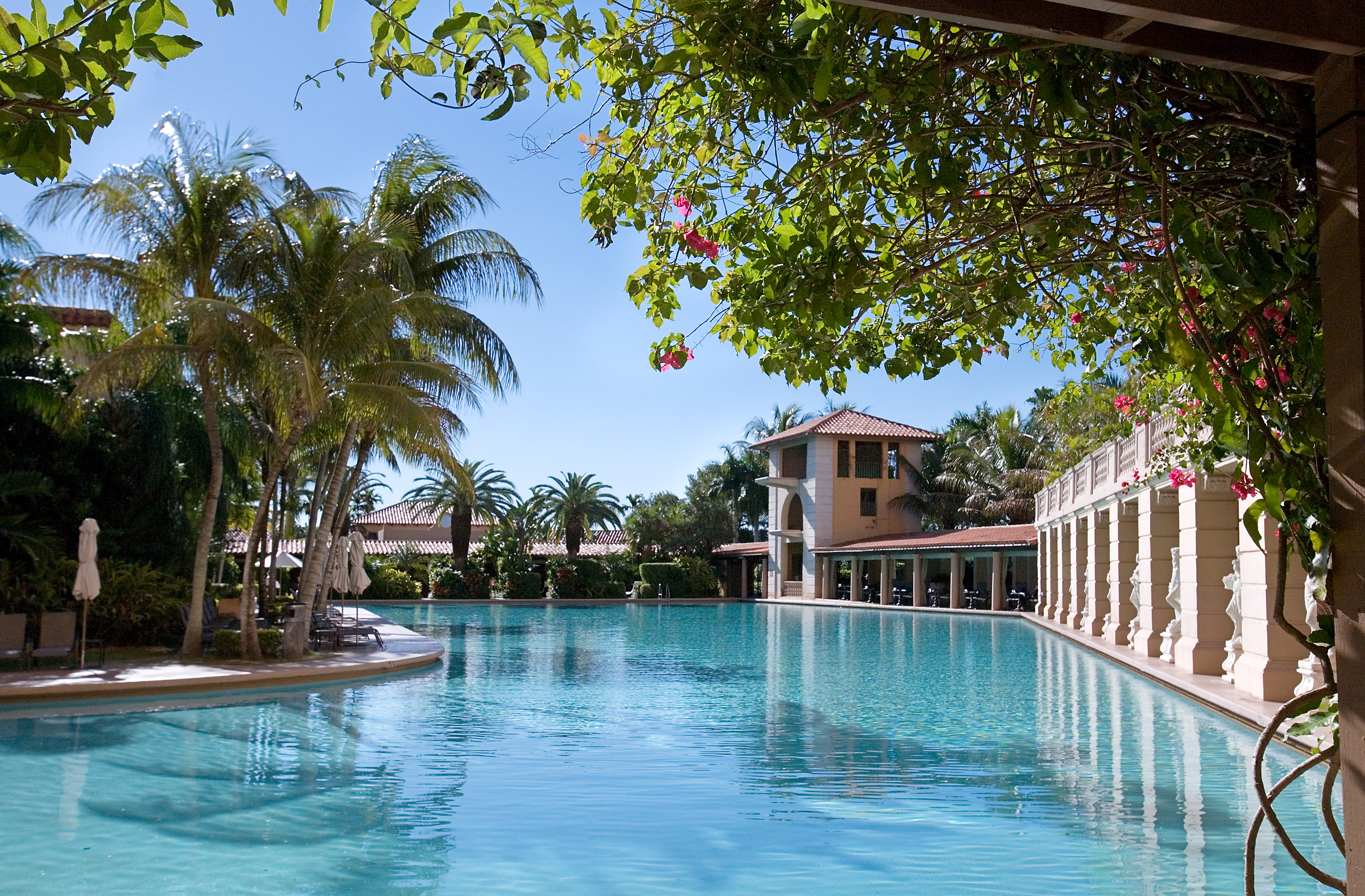
Pool

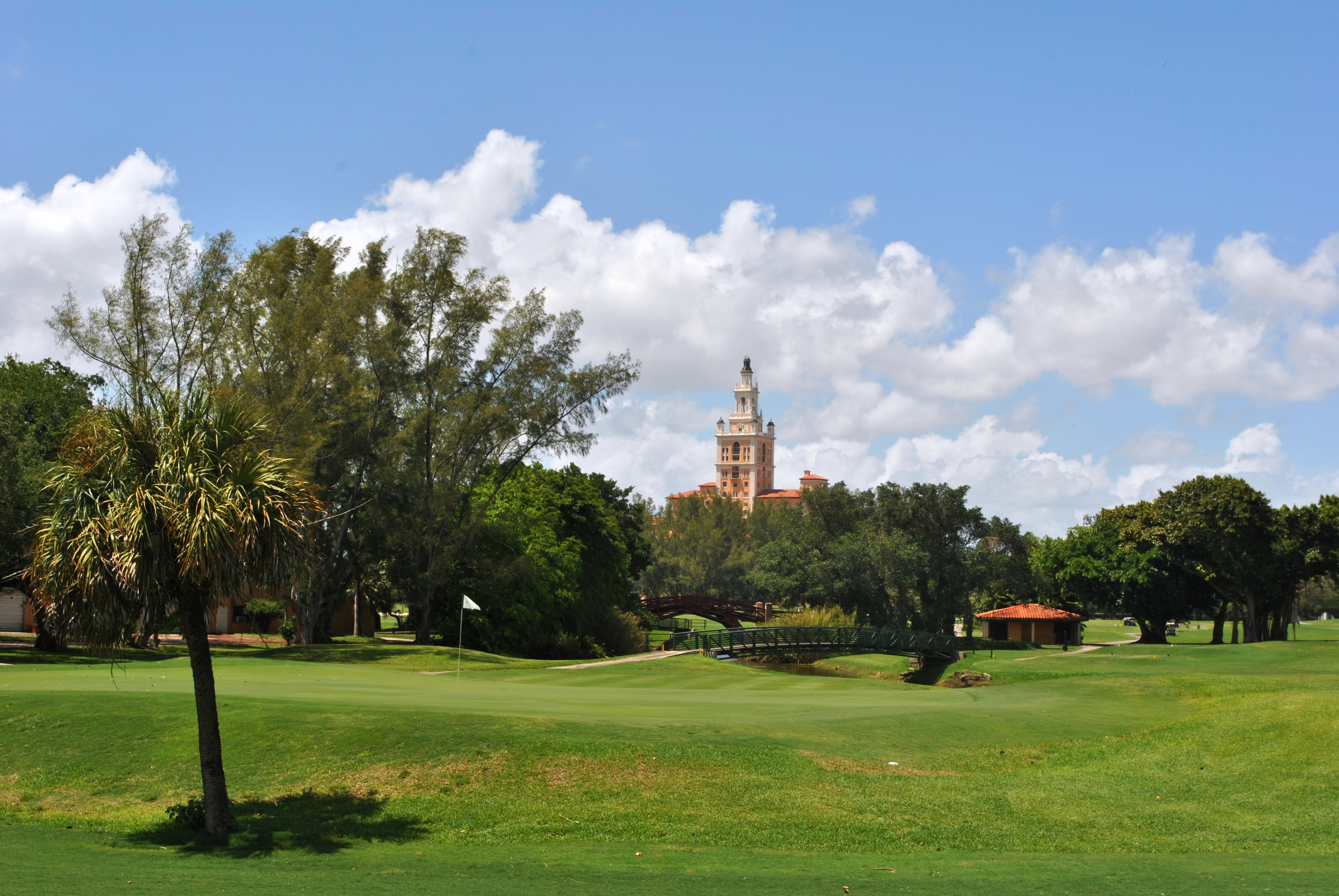
Golf course

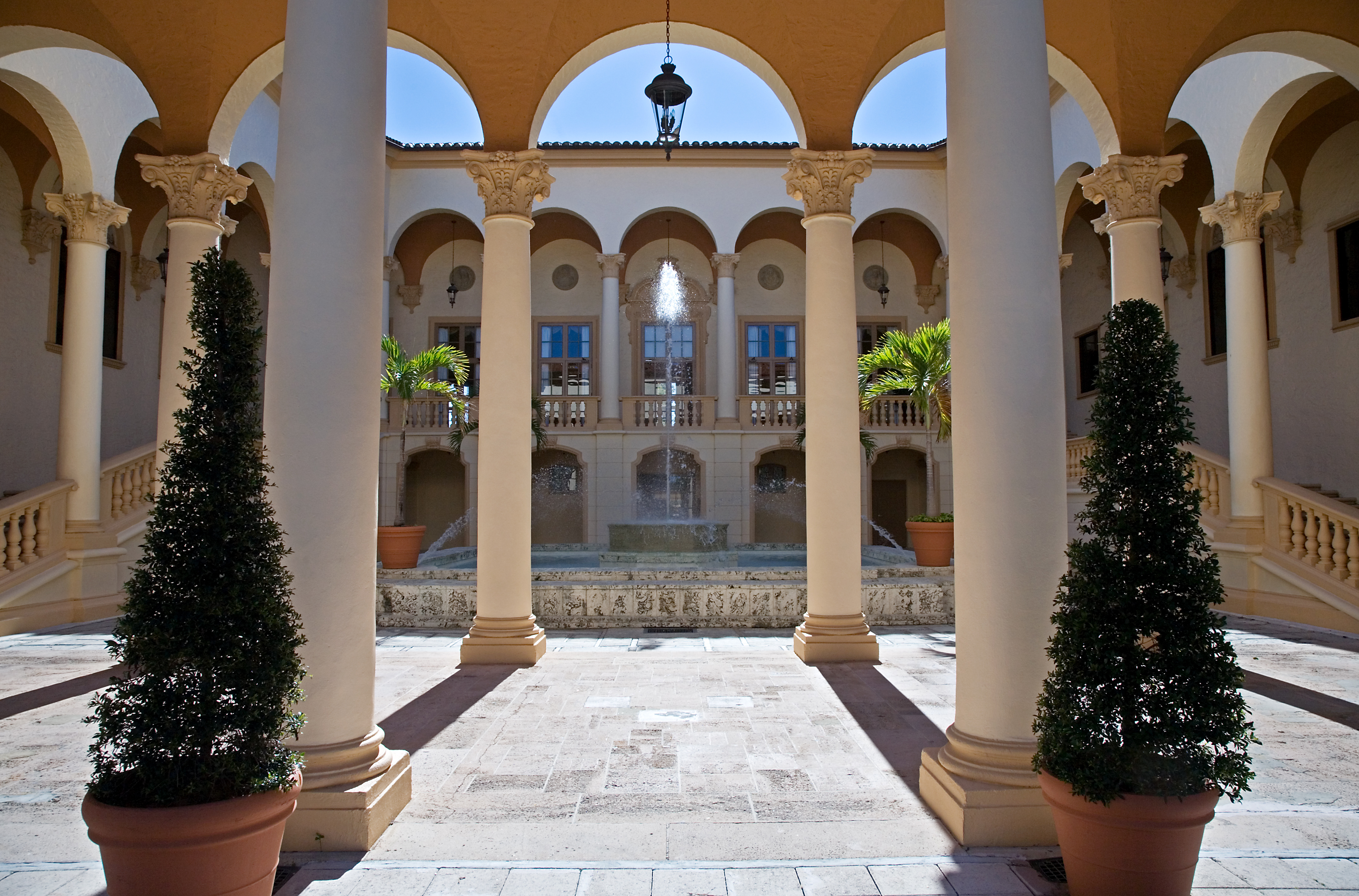
Arcade and courtyard with fountain

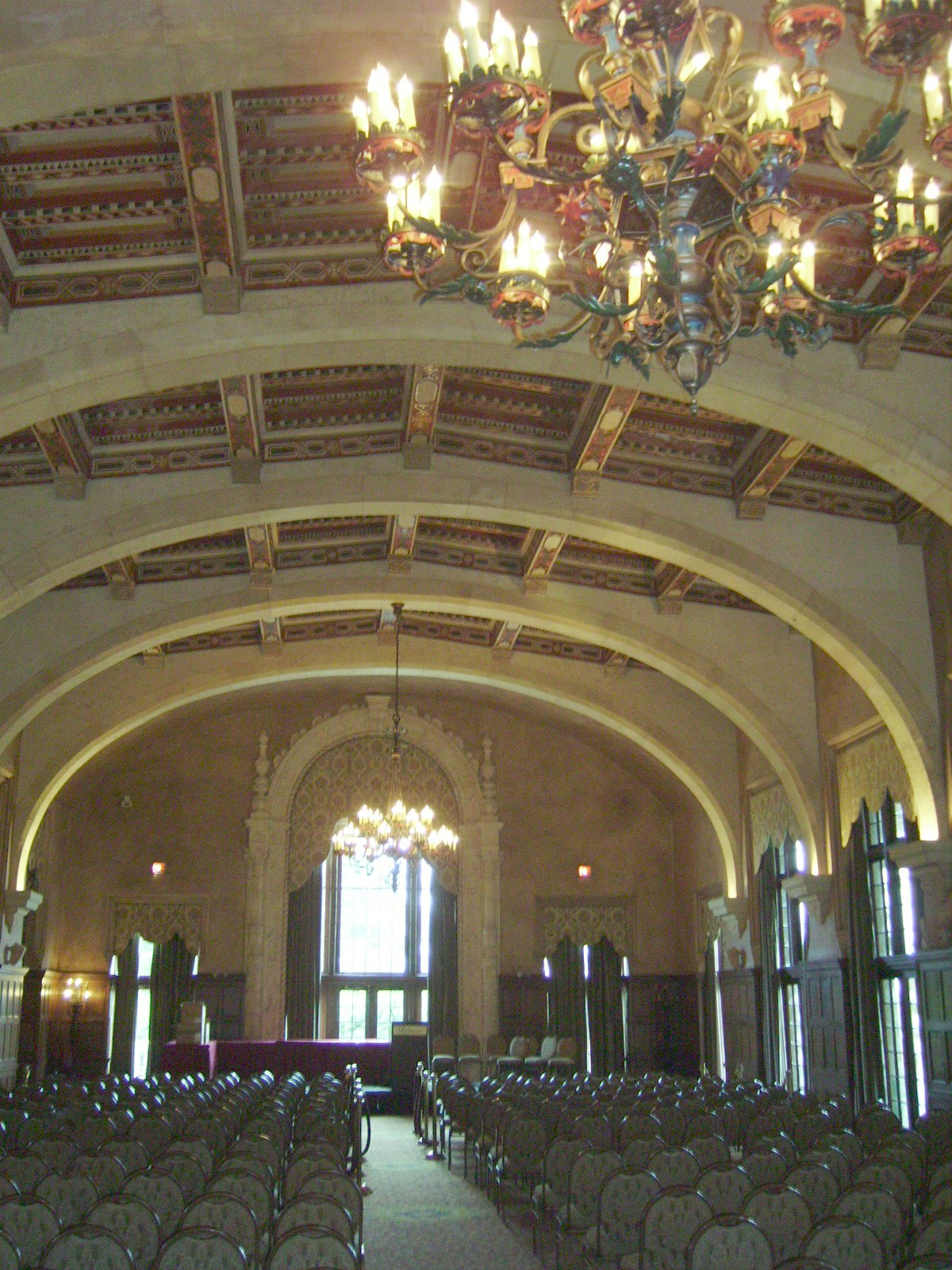
One of the reception halls

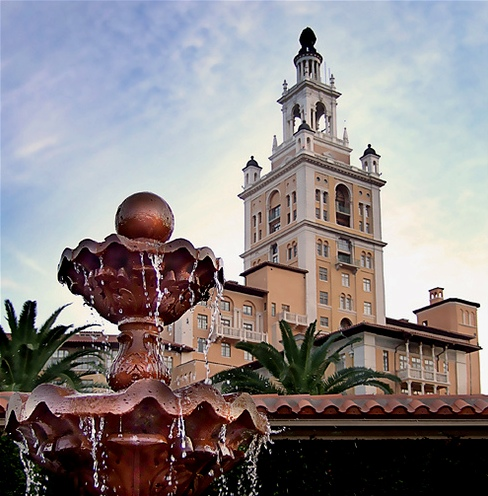
Fountain

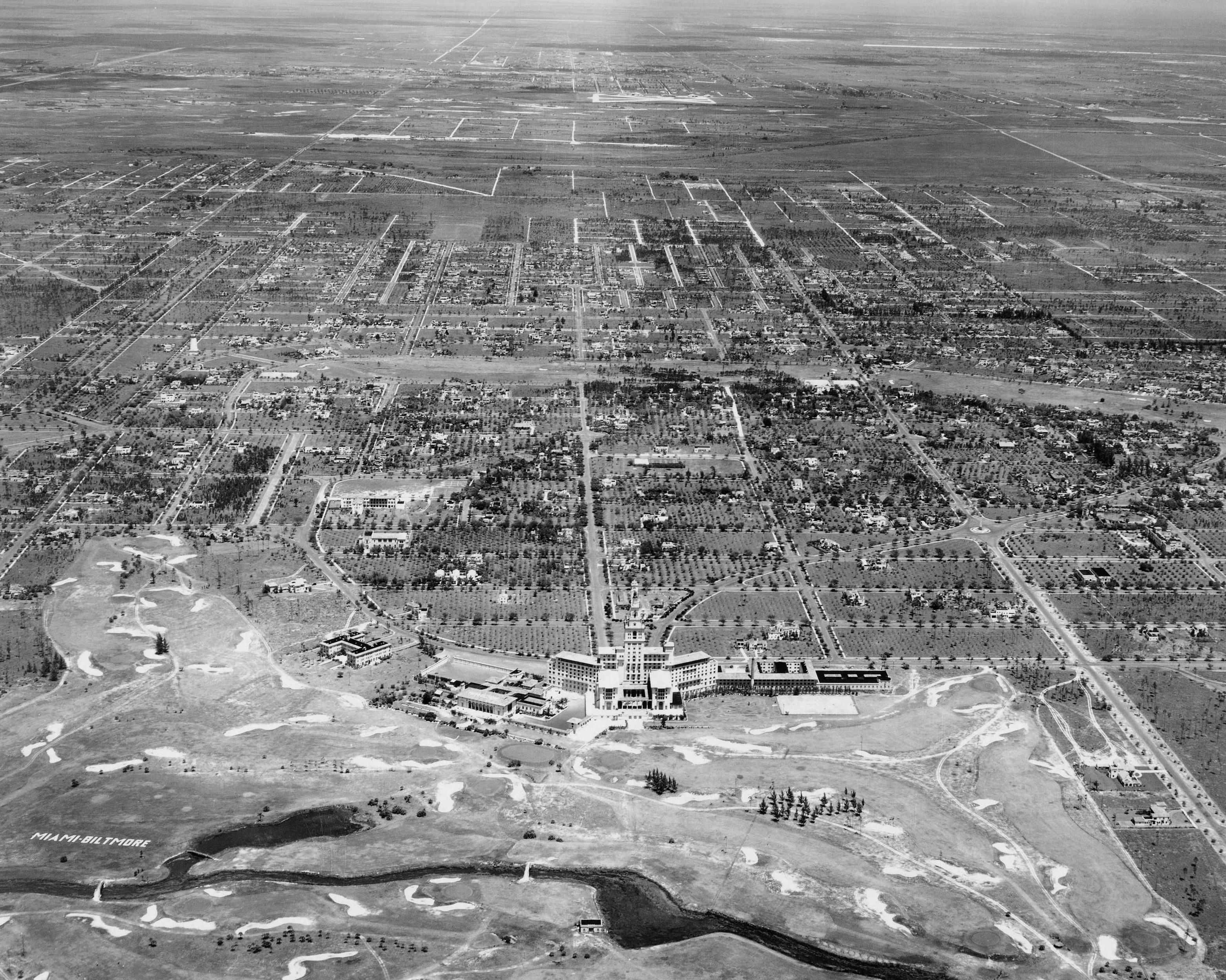
Aerial photo

Records
Preceded by Freedom Tower (Miami)	Tallest Building in Florida; 1926–1928; 96m	Succeeded by Miami-Dade County Courthouse
