= John McEntee Bowman =

Canadian-American businessman (1875–1931)

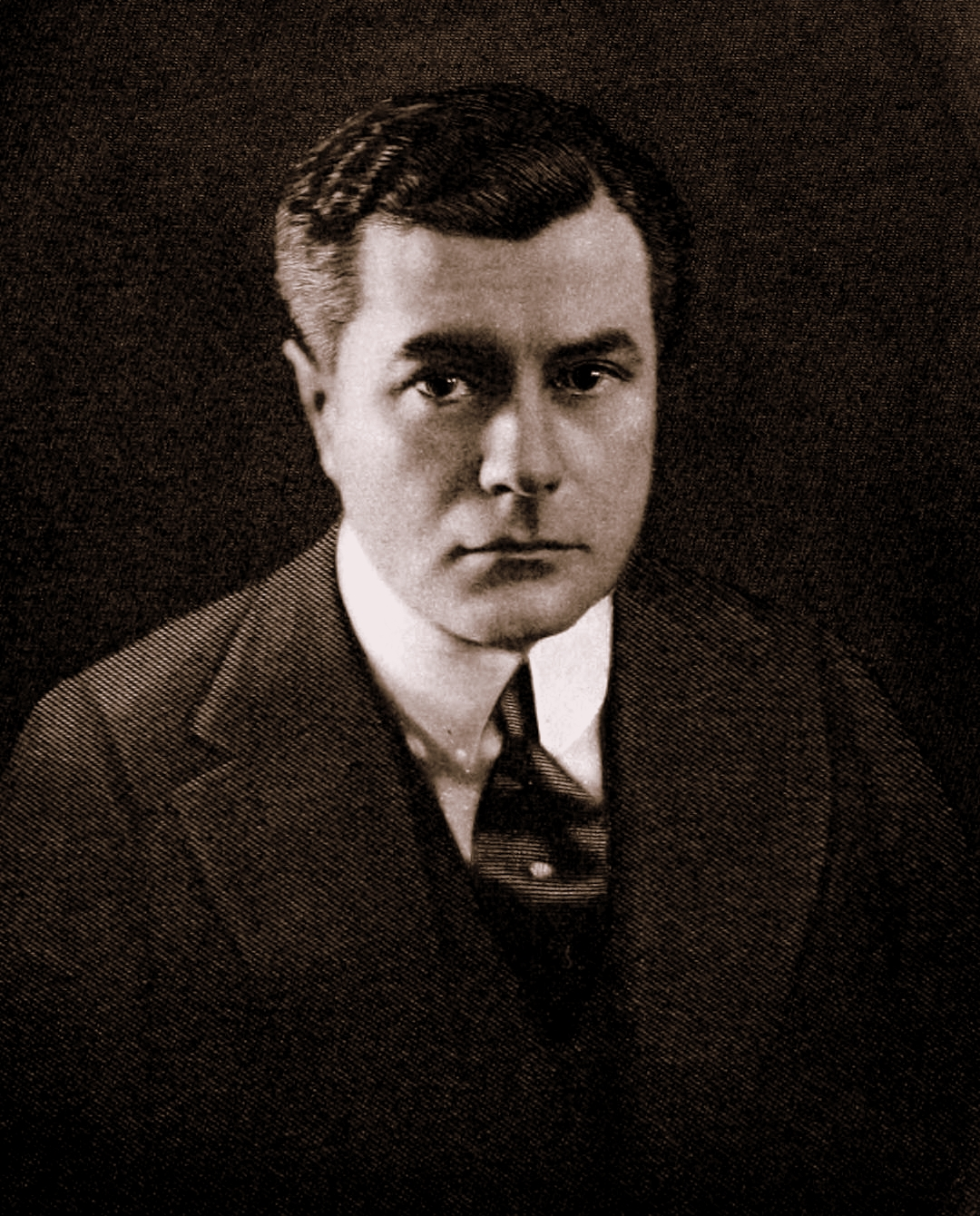
John McEntee Bowman

John McEntee Bowman (1875 – October 28, 1931) was a Canadian-born businessman, American hotelier and horseman, and the founding president of Bowman-Biltmore Hotels Corp.

== Biography ==
Born in Toronto, Ontario, Bowman began his American working life in a men's clothing store in Yonkers, New York, but learned the hotel business at New York City's Holland House Hotel. When the owner died in 1913, Bowman bought his new Biltmore hotel from his estate and built it into a chain of one of the most recognized hotel names in the world. Bowman was responsible for the building of the Westchester Country Club in Rye, New York , and counted the Coral Gables Biltmore Hotel in Coral Gables, Florida, the Millennium Biltmore Hotel in Los Angeles, California, the New York Biltmore Hotel in New York City and the Sevilla-Biltmore Hotel in Havana, Cuba, as part of his extensive hotel holdings.

A horse lover and Thoroughbred racing enthusiast, Bowman was president of the United Hunts Racing Association and the National Horse Show and for a time served as the president of the Havana-American Jockey Club that operated the Oriental Park Racetrack in Marianao, Cuba.

Bowman died in Manhattan, New York, at the age of 56, after an operation to remove gallstones.
