= The Biltmore Los Angeles =

Hotel in Los Angeles, California

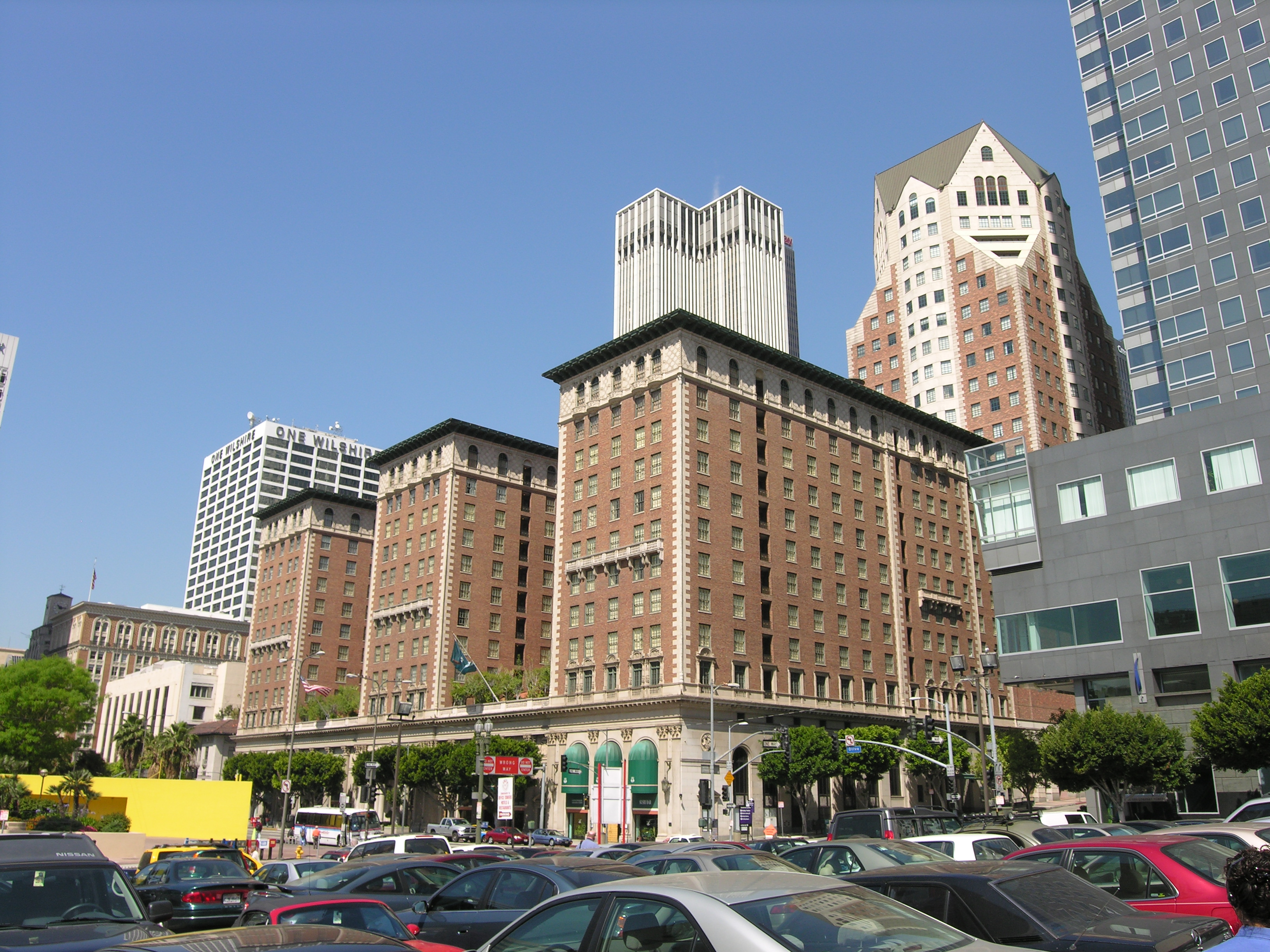

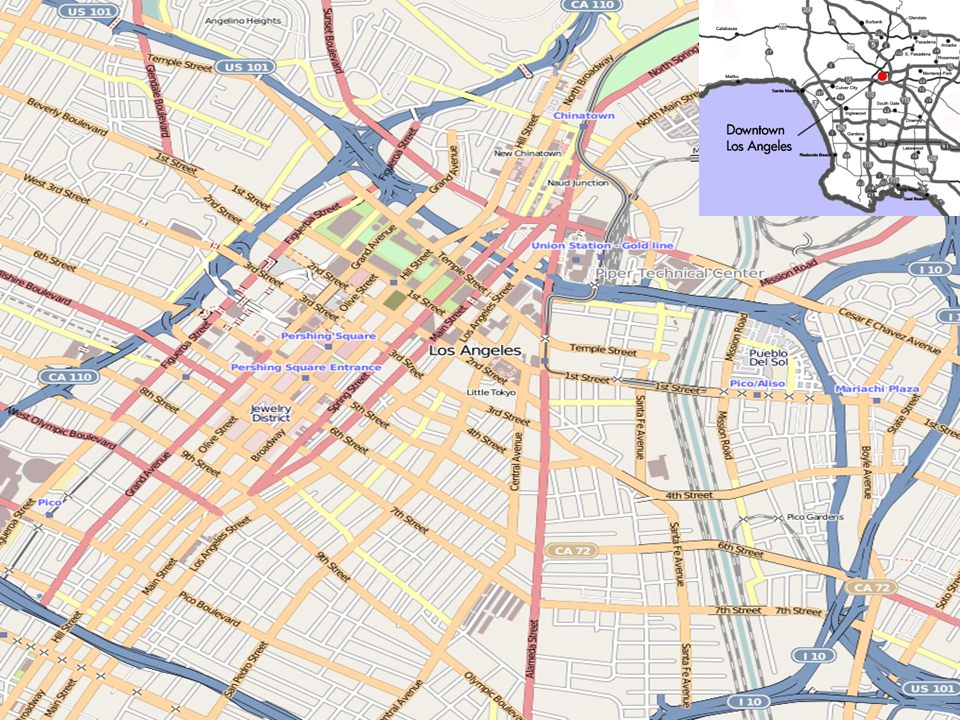
- Location within the Downtown Los Angeles Area

General information
- Location: Los Angeles, California, 506 South Grand Avenue, Downtown Los Angeles
- Coordinates: 34°02′56″N 118°15′12″W
- Opening: 1923
- Owner: Millennium & Copthorne Hotels

Los Angeles Historic-Cultural Monument
- Designated: July 2, 1969
- Reference no.: 60

Design and construction
- Architect: Schultze and Weaver
- Developer: Biltmore Hotels with John McEntee Bowman

Other information
- Number of rooms: 1,500 (originally); 683 (2001)

Website
- The Biltmore Los Angeles

The Biltmore Los Angeles is a historic hotel opened in 1923 and located opposite Pershing Square in Downtown Los Angeles, California. The hotel has 70,000 square feet (6,500 m^{2}) of meeting and banquet space. Built with 1500 guestrooms, it now has 683.

== History ==
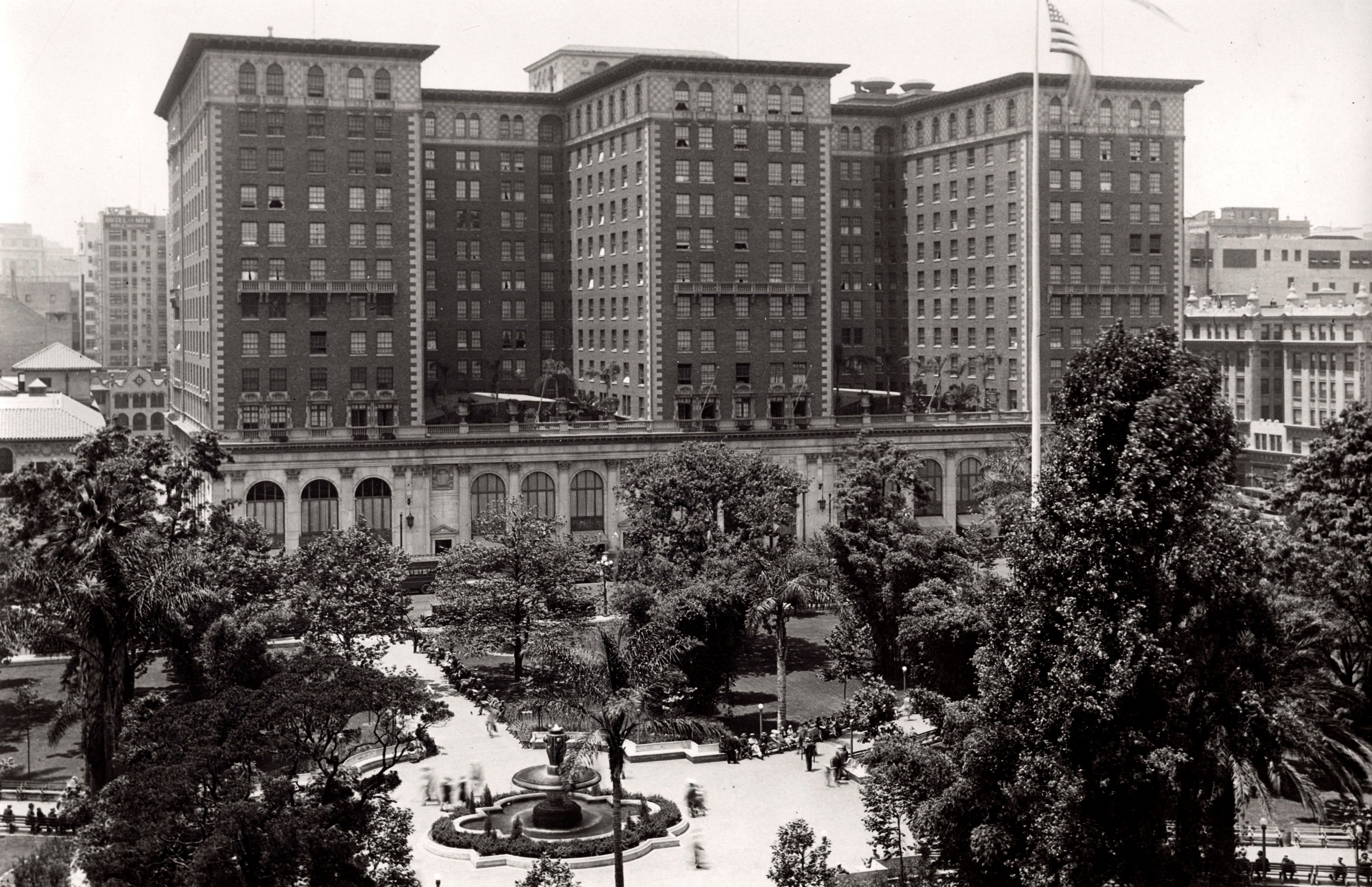
Los Angeles Biltmore, 1929

The Los Angeles Biltmore opened on October 1, 1923. It was developed by the nationwide Bowman-Biltmore Hotels chain. At the time, it was the largest hotel in the United States west of Chicago.

The hotel was sold to nightclub owner Baron Long in 1933, in the depths of the Great Depression. Long also owned the U.S. Grant Hotel in San Diego and had developed the Agua Caliente resort in Tijuana. Long renovated the hotel and renamed it The Biltmore Hotel. He established the Biltmore Bowl, the world's largest nightclub, in the hotel's basement.

In 1951, the Los Angeles Biltmore Hotel Company was sold to Corrigan Properties for more than $12 million. In 1969, The Biltmore Hotel was designated a Los Angeles Historic-Cultural Monument by the City of Los Angeles. The decaying hotel was sold for $5 million in 1976 to developer Gene R. Summers and his business partner Phyllis Lambert. They spent millions more to restore the hotel over the next five years, before selling it to Westgroup Inc. in 1984. Westgroup redeveloped the property to designs by Seattle architect Barnett Schorr. The guest rooms in the rear portion of the structure, facing Grand Avenue, were converted to office space known as Biltmore Court. Directly adjacent on Grand Avenue, an adjoining 24-story office tower was constructed on the property, the Biltmore Tower. The remaining hotel portion facing Pershing Square was completely renovated.

Regal Hotels purchased The Biltmore in 1996 and it was renamed the Regal Biltmore Hotel. Regal was sold to Millennium & Copthorne Hotels in 1999, and the hotel was renamed the Millennium Biltmore Hotel on April 9, 2001. In 2016, Millennium & Copthorne Hotels established a separate luxury brand called The Biltmore, and in 2024, the hotel was moved from the Millennium brand to The Biltmore brand and renamed The Biltmore Los Angeles. That same year, it was inducted into Historic Hotels of America, a program of the National Trust for Historic Preservation.

== Architecture ==
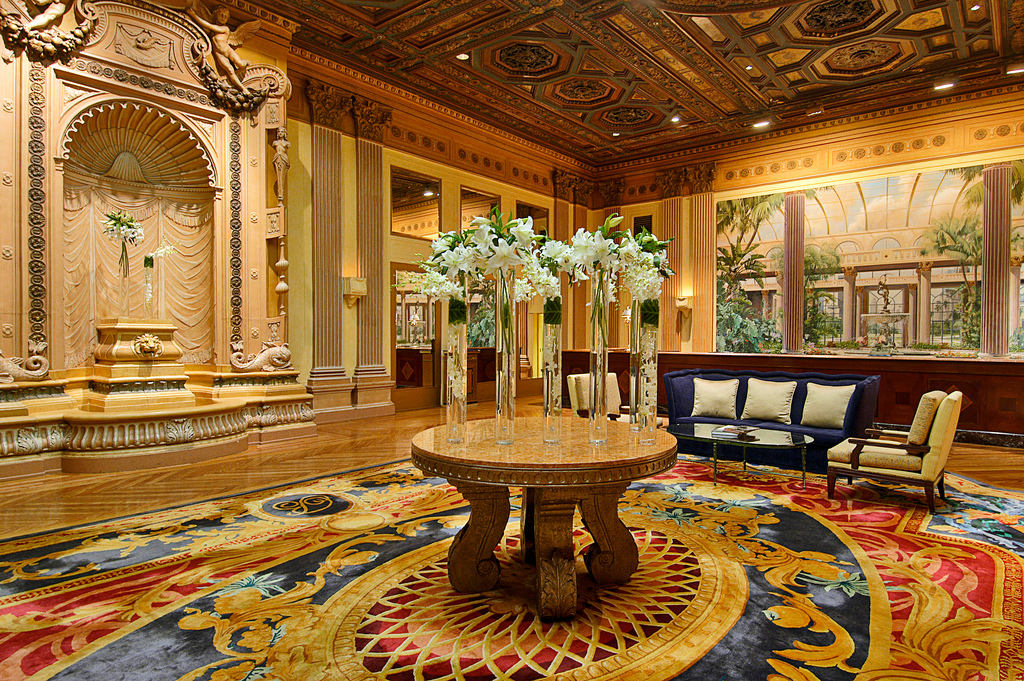
Millennium Biltmore Hotel Lobby

The architectural firm Schultze & Weaver designed the Biltmore's exterior in a synthesis of the Spanish-Italian Renaissance Revival, Mediterranean Revival, and Beaux Arts styles, meant as an homage to the Castilian heritage of Los Angeles. The "Biltmore Angel" is heavily incorporated into the design—as a symbol of the city as well as the Biltmore itself. With a thick steel and concrete frame, the structure takes up half a city block and rises over 11 stories.

The interiors of the Biltmore Hotel are decorated with: frescos and murals; carved marble fountains and columns; massive wood-beamed ceilings; travertine and oak paneled walls; lead crystal chandeliers; cast bronze stairwells and doorways; fine artisan marquetry and mill work; and heavily embroidered imported tapestries and draperies. Most notable are the frescoed mural ceilings in the main Galleria and the Crystal Ballroom, which were hand painted in 1922 by Italian artist John B. Smeraldi, known for his work in the Vatican and the White House. Smeraldi and his team famously painted the ballroom's colorful, seamless fresco over a period of seven months, decorating it with figures of Greek and Roman gods, angels, cupids and other mythological creatures. It was meticulously restored in the 1980s by Smeraldi's apprentice, Anthony Heinsbergen. The imported Austrian crystal chandeliers that adorn it are 12 feet (3.7 m) in diameter.

The hotel's original main lobby is today known as the Rendezvous Court, and is used for afternoon tea. It is decorated with a Moorish Revival styled plaster ceiling painted with 24-carat gold accents, two original imported Italian chandeliers from 1923, and a grand Spanish Baroque Revival bronze doorway, whose astronomical clock still keeps time today. Two figures appear on the stairwell front—on the left is the Roman goddess of agriculture Ceres, while on the right is the Spanish explorer Vasco Núñez de Balboa. The current main lobby is located in the rear of the building, in the former Music Room, at the hotel's Grand Avenue entrance. It still has its original travertine walls and oak paneling, as well as the large artificial skylighted ceiling, reflected in the custom carpet below.

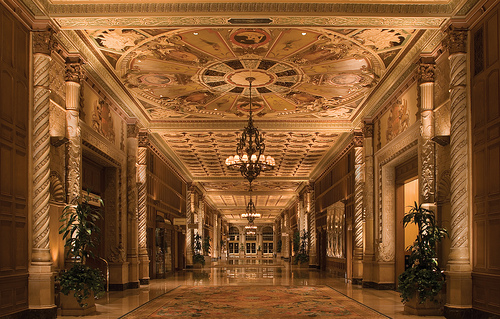
Millennium Biltmore Hotel Galleria

Each ballroom on the Galleria level is themed either after the room's original function or the hotel's overall California-heritage premise. The Crystal Ballroom was the hotel's original main ballroom. The Emerald Ballroom was once the hotel's main dining room; its decor features images of hunt and harvest, with hand-painted animals and fish on the cast-plaster ceiling beams. The Tiffany Room was originally a foyer for the adjoining Crystal Ballroom. Its decor centers around exploration, with relief sculptures and panels depicting Queen Isabella I of Castile, as well as Christopher Columbus and other Spanish New World explorers. The split-level Gold Room, once a dining room for elite guests, features Prohibition-era hidden liquor compartments and panels along the ceiling for press photographers to take pictures of the event below. It is decorated with a gold cast-plaster ceiling, hand-oiled wood paneling, and nine mirrored windows along three sides.

The South Galleria is painted with floral friezes inspired by the decor of ancient Roman Pompeii, and features a vaulted ceiling, marble balustrades and heavy Roman piers. Gold-painted wrought iron gates open to a staircase leading down to the huge Biltmore Bowl ballroom, in the hotel's basement.

Also of interest is the hotel's health club and indoor pool, which was modeled after the decks of 1920s luxury ocean liners. Solid brass trim on windows, doors and railings, teakwood deck chairs and hand-laid Italian mosaic tile on the walls and in the pool are original.

== Events ==
The Los Angeles Biltmore is known for being an early home to the Academy Awards ceremony—the Oscars. The Academy of Motion Picture Arts and Sciences was founded at a luncheon banquet in the Crystal Ballroom in May 1927, when guests such as Louis B. Mayer met to discuss plans for the new organization and presenting achievement awards to colleagues in their industry. Legend has it that MGM art director Cedric Gibbons, who was in attendance, immediately grabbed a linen Biltmore napkin and sketched the design for the Oscar statue on it. Eight Oscar ceremonies were held in the Biltmore Bowl during the Academy's early years of 1931, 1935–1939, and 1941–1942. The band leader Shep Fields conducted his "Rippling Rhythm Orchestra" during the 1939 ceremonies at the Biltmore. Decades later in 1977, Bob Hope hosted the Academy's 50th Anniversary banquet in the same room.

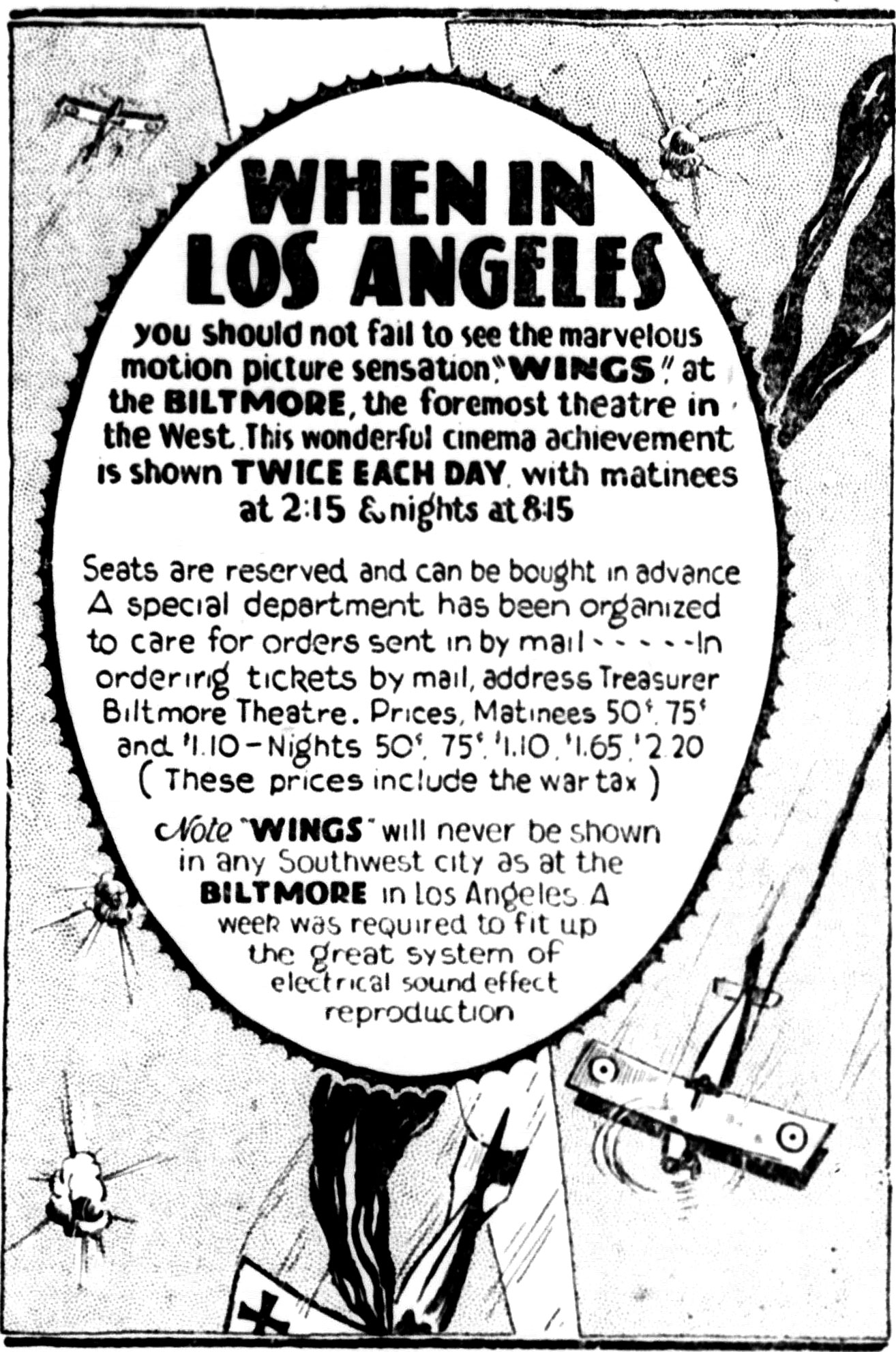
1928 ad for showings of the 1927 film Wings at the Biltmore Theater

The Biltmore Theater was situated at the corner of 5th and Grand, now the Biltmore Court & Tower location. Will Rogers emceed the opening of the theater in 1924, which then hosted plays starring Helen Hayes, Katharine Hepburn, Alfred Lunt, Lynn Fontanne, Bela Lugosi and Mae West until it closed in 1967. It also occasionally booked high-profile films such as the 1925 silent epic Ben Hur: A Tale of the Christ which ran for 14 weeks in 1926 and silent Academy Award winner Wings, which stayed over 20 weeks in 1928.

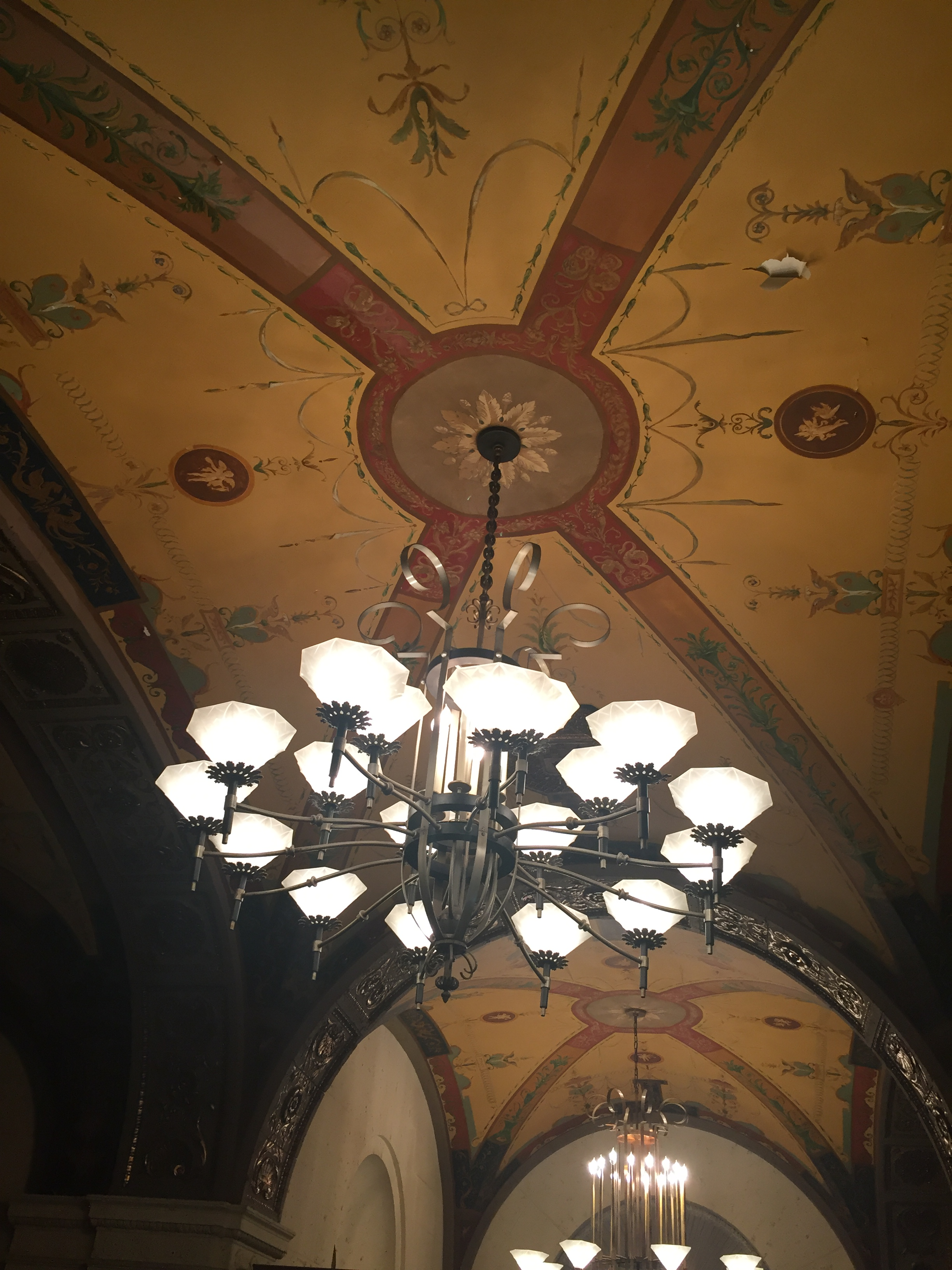
Biltmore chandelier in the galleria.

In 1929, Germany's Graf Zeppelin airship soared over the hotel on its round-the-world voyage, sponsored by newspaper magnate William Randolph Hearst. Crew and passengers were fed by Biltmore culinary staff, who also replenished their on-board supplies.

The Los Angeles Biltmore hotel also featured notable recordings from the early 1930s on the Brunswick record label by Earl Burtnett & His Los Angeles Biltmore Hotel Orchestra, with songs such as the popular "Putting on the Ritz" being recorded with an orchestra attributed to the hotel.

During World War II, the Biltmore served as a military rest and recreation facility, with the entire second floor equipped with cots for military personnel on leave.

On March 7, 1952, the well-known yogi and author Paramahansa Yogananda, collapsed and died of a heart attack after finishing a speech at a banquet in honor of the Indian ambassador Binay Ranjan Sen. This site within the hotel is now revered by many as the place of the yogi's mahasamadhi, or conscious leave of the body.

The 1960 Democratic National Convention in Los Angeles chose John F. Kennedy as the party's presidential nominee. He set up his campaign headquarters in the Music Room (now the Lobby), with running mate Lyndon B. Johnson across the hall in the Emerald Room. Their press conferences in the Crystal Ballroom were heavily photographed and documented.

The Beatles paid a visit to the Presidential Suite in August 1964 during their first U.S. tour. Due to the overwhelming number of fans crowding the sidewalks in front of the hotel, the band was forced to access their room by landing atop the hotel in a helicopter.

The Los Angeles Biltmore Hotel served the International Olympic Committee as their headquarters during the 1984 Summer Olympics. In 1988, the Duke & Duchess of York were hosted by Armand Hammer at a Biltmore gala. Recently the Biltmore has hosted the semi-finals for American Idol, the yearly awards for the Cinemal Audio Society, visiting teams for the World Baseball Classic, and multiple Grammy Awards after-parties.

== Films and TV shows ==
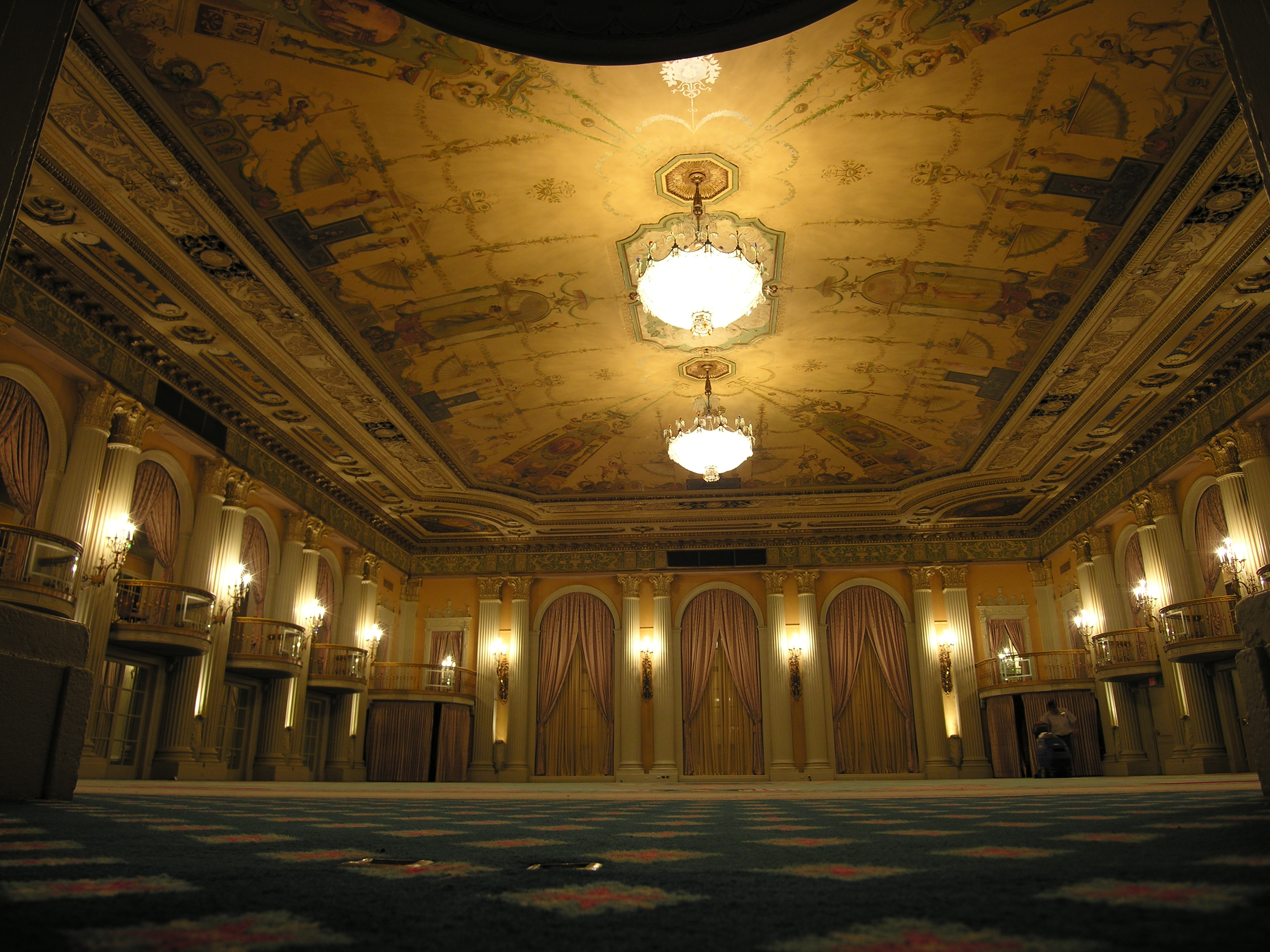
The Crystal Ballrom, often used as a filming location.

- Scenes from many movies and television shows have been filmed at the hotel, including:

=== Films ===
10 Things I Hate About You (1999)
Alien Nation (1988)
Austin Powers: International Man of Mystery (1997)
Bachelor Party (1984)
Beverly Hills Cop (1984)
Blow (2001)
Blue Streak (1999)
Bugsy (1991)
Chinatown (1974)
Cruel Intentions (1999)
Daredevil (2003)
Dave (1993)
The Fabulous Baker Boys (1989)
A Family Affair (2024)
The Game (1997)
Ghostbusters (1984)
Heartbreakers (2001)
In the Line of Fire (1993)
Independence Day (1996)
The Italian Job (2003)
National Treasure: Book of Secrets (2007)
The Nutty Professor (1996)
Ocean's 11 (1960)
The Omega Man (1971)
Oppenheimer (2023)
Pretty in Pink (1986)
Prom Night (2008)
Rocky III (1982)
Something New (2006)
Splash (1984)
A Star Is Born (1937)
They Live (1988)
True Lies (1994)
Wedding Crashers (2005)
The Wedding Ringer (2015)
The hotel's exterior can also be seen in Fight Club (1999) and Heat (1995).

=== Television ===
24
Ally McBeal
Beverly Hills, 90210
Black Monday
Bosch
Charlie's Angels
Columbo
CSI: NY
Dinner for Five
Drop Dead Diva
Entourage
ER
Glee
The Golden Girls
The Good Place
Grey's Anatomy
Hacks
Heroes
House
The L Word: Generation Q
Leverage
Mad Men
Mob City
Murder, She Wrote
Nip/Tuck
NYPD Blue
The Real Housewives of Beverly Hills
Scandal
That '70s Show
Timeless
War and Remembrance
The West Wing
The hotel was featured in Visiting... with Huell Howser, Episode 625, as well as a commercial for Stanton Optical, a company based in Palm Springs, Florida. The hotel's exterior can also be seen in Curb Your Enthusiasm and in the thirty-fifth season of The Amazing Race.

The hotel hosted Miss Teen USA 2024 and Miss USA 2024 on August 4, 2024.

=== Music videos ===
Anjulie, Rain (2009)
Justin Bieber, Yummy (2020)
Daughtry (2009)
Janet Jackson, Son of a Gun (I Betcha Think This Song Is About You) (2001)
Jisoo, Flower (2023)
Alexander Kogan (2011)
John Legend (featuring Chance the Rapper), Penthouse Floor (2016)
Jennifer Lopez, El Anillo (2018)
Lostprophets (2009)
Meek Mill & Drake, Going Bad (2019)
Steve Perry, Oh Sherrie (1984)
Daniel Powter (2005)
Chris Price, Homesick (2012)
Ed Sheeran, Thinking Out Loud (2014)
Simple Plan, Shut Up! (2005)
Britney Spears, Overprotected (Darkchild Remix) (2002)
Taylor Swift, Delicate (2018)
Tank (2010)
The Wallflowers (2005)
