= George Foster Shepley (architect) =

American architect

George Foster Shepley FAIA
- Born: November 7, 1860; St. Louis, Missouri
- Died: July 17, 1903 (aged 42); St. Moritz, Grisons, Switzerland
- Occupation: Architect
- Spouse: Julia Hayden Richardson (m. 1886)
- Practice: Shepley, Rutan & Coolidge
- Buildings: Ames Building; South Station; Art Institute of Chicago; Chicago Cultural Center; Guardian Bank Building
- Education: Washington University, B.A. (1880); Massachusetts Institute of Technology, (1882)
- Relatives: Ether Shepley (grandfather); Henry Hobson Richardson (father-in-law)

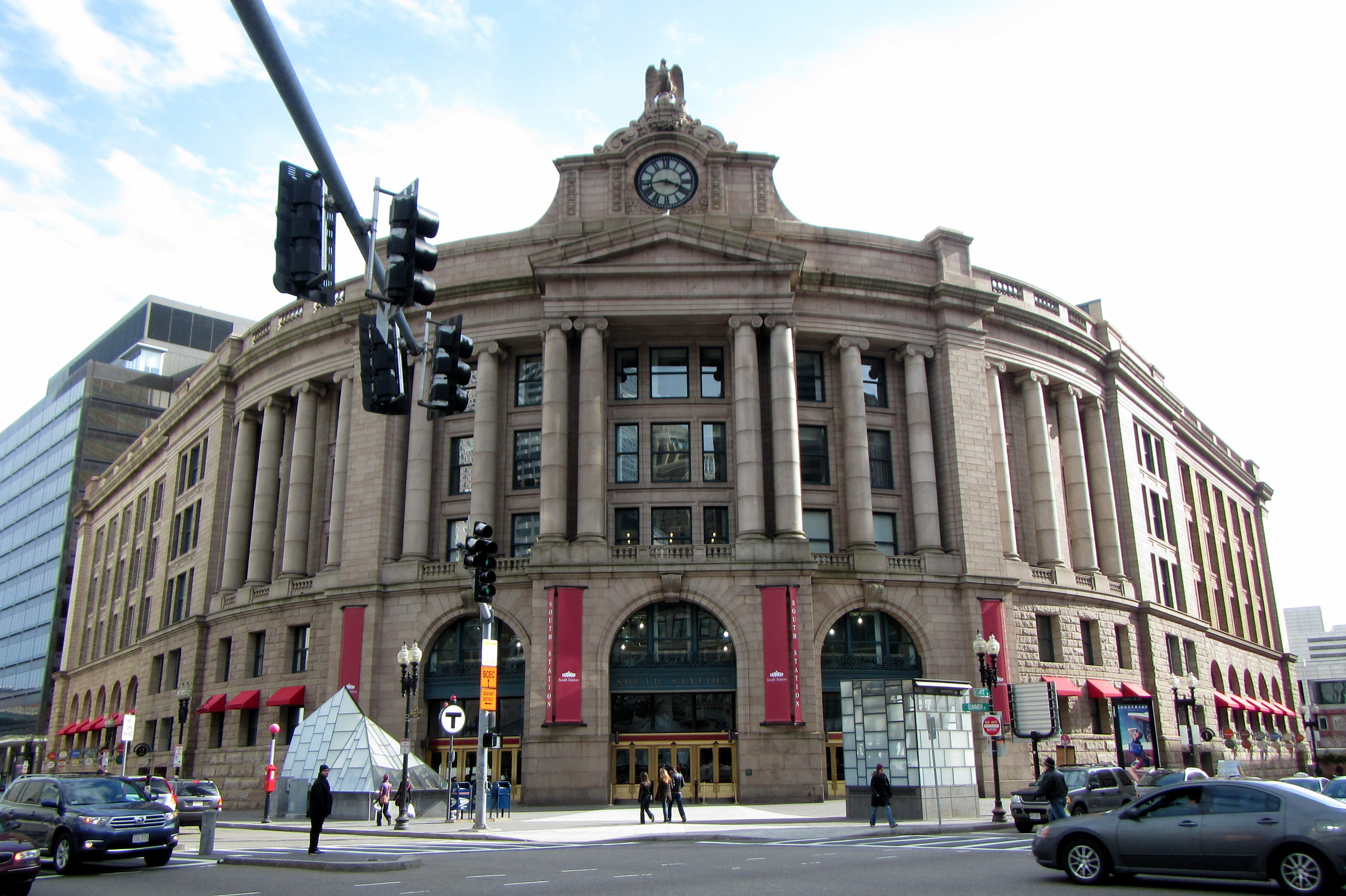
South Station in Boston, designed by Shepley, Rutan & Coolidge and completed in 1899.

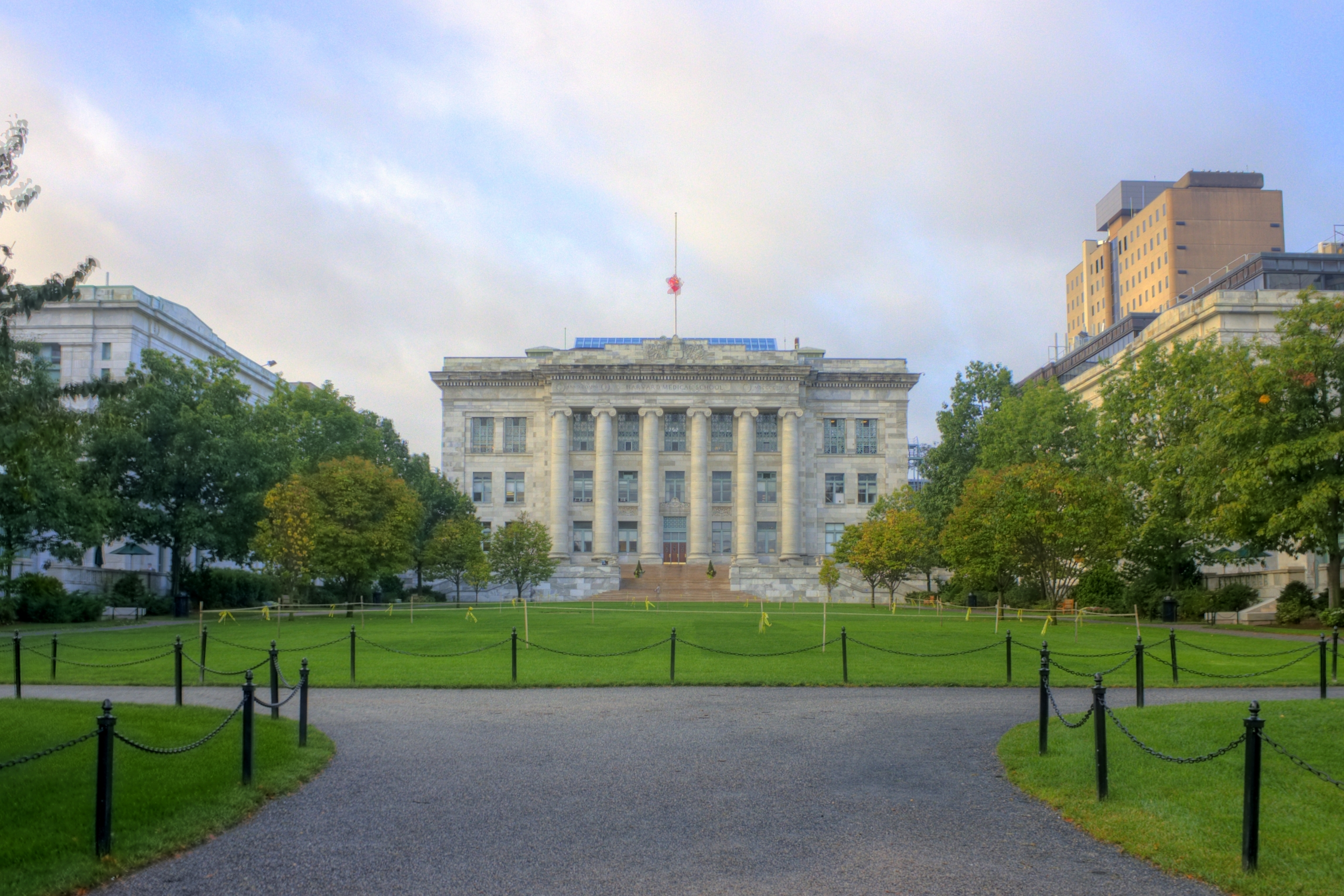
The Harvard Medical School campus, completed in 1906.

George Foster Shepley FAIA (November 7, 1860 – July 17, 1903) was an American architect. He was the senior partner in the firm of Shepley, Rutan & Coolidge of Boston and Chicago, the successor to the firm of architect Henry Hobson Richardson.

== Life and career ==
George Foster Shepley was born on November 7, 1860, in St Louis, Missouri, to John Rutledge Shepley, a lawyer, and Mary Augusta (Clapp) Shepley. Senator Ether Shepley of Maine was his grandfather. He received his B.A. from Washington University in St. Louis in 1880 and graduated from the Massachusetts Institute of Technology in 1882. Shepley worked briefly for the Boston firm of Ware & Van Brunt before joining the Brookline studio of Henry Hobson Richardson. Shepley had worked for Richardson for about four years when he died in April 1886. Shepley and two other senior employees, Charles Hercules Rutan and Charles Allerton Coolidge, then took charge of the studio and its uncompleted work. In June 1886 the three formed a formal partnership, Shepley, Rutan & Coolidge, to succeed to Richardson's practice, and in 1887 moved the office to Boston.

Shepley was senior partner of the firm until his death in 1903. During his lifetime, the firm completed many major works, including the Inner Quad (1891) of Stanford University in California, the Ames Building (1893) and South Station (1899) in Boston, the Art Institute of Chicago (1893) and Chicago Cultural Center (1897) in Chicago and the Guardian Bank Building (1896) in Cleveland. At the time of his death he was at work on designs for the new campus of the Harvard Medical School.

Shepley was a member of the Boston Society of Architects and joined the American Institute of Architects in 1889 as a Fellow. He was also a member of the Somerset Club and the Tavern Club.

== Legacy and personal life ==
Shepley is credited for redirecting the firm's stylistic output from the idiosyncratic Richardsonian Romanesque style to the Classical architecture of the Beaux-Arts movement.

In 1886 Shepley was married to Julia Hayden Richardson, daughter of H. H. Richardson. The marriage took place about two months after her father's death. Together the couple had five children, including three sons and two daughters. Their eldest child, Henry Richardson Shepley (1887–1962), was also an architect. He joined Shepley, Rutan & Coolidge in 1914 and became a partner in its successor firm, Coolidge, Shepley, Bulfinch & Abbott, in 1924. Hugh Shepley (1928–2017), son of Henry R. Shepley, was also later a partner in the firm.

Shepley died July 17, 1903, in St. Moritz, Switzerland, where he had traveled for health-related reasons.
