= Charles Allerton Coolidge =

American architect

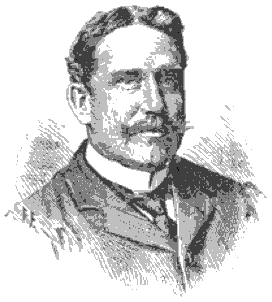
- Charles A. Coolidge, circa 1906
- Born: November 30, 1858; Boston
- Died: April 1, 1936 (aged 85); Locust Valley, New York
- Occupation: Architect

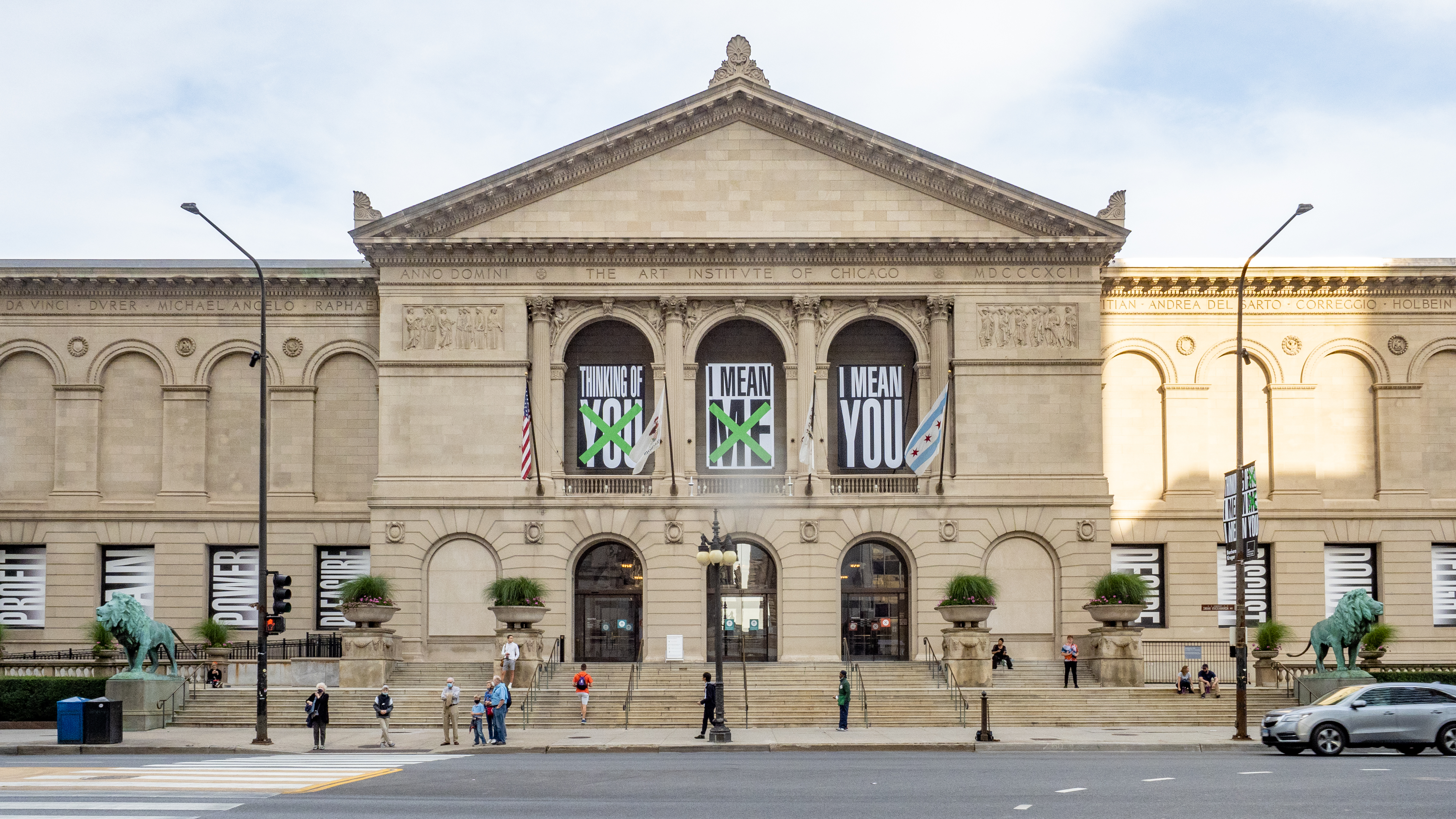
The Art Institute of Chicago, designed by Shepley, Rutan & Coolidge and completed in 1893.

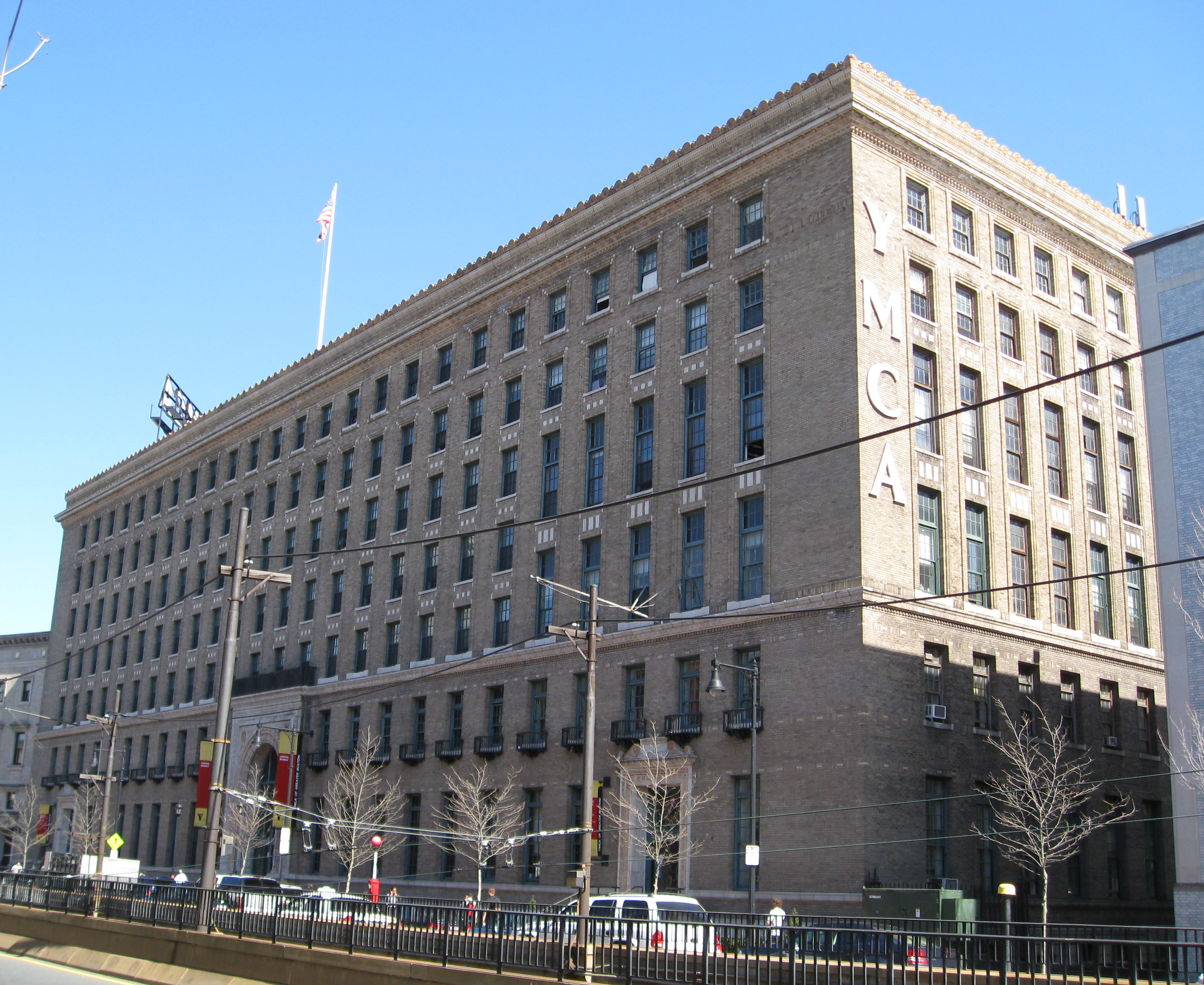
The Boston YMCA, completed in 1911.

Charles Allerton Coolidge FAIA (1858–1936) was an American architect best known as a partner in the architecture firm of Shepley, Rutan & Coolidge of Boston and Chicago, successors to the firm of architect Henry Hobson Richardson and one of the best-known architecture firms in the United States. Coolidge was also senior partner in that firm's successors, Coolidge & Shattuck and Coolidge, Shepley, Bulfinch & Abbott of Boston and Coolidge & Hodgdon of Chicago.

== Life and career ==
Charles Allerton Coolidge was born November 30, 1858, in Boston to David Hill Coolidge, a lawyer, and Isabella (Shurtleff) Coolidge. He was educated in the private school of John P. Hopkinson and entered Harvard College in 1877, graduating in 1881. After three months with Ware & Van Brunt he entered the Massachusetts Institute of Technology for a special course in architecture. After another year with Van Brunt he moved to the studio of Henry Hobson Richardson in Brookline in March 1883. When Richardson died in April 1886 Coolidge and two other senior employees, George Foster Shepley and Charles Hercules Rutan, took charge of the studio and its uncompleted work. In June 1886 the three formed a formal partnership, Shepley, Rutan & Coolidge, to succeed to Richardson's practice, and in 1887 moved the office to Boston. Together, they developed one of the largest American architectural firms of its era.

In 1892 the firm was awarded the commission to design the Art Institute of Chicago. To execute this and other projects the firm opened a second office in Chicago, under the direct management of Coolidge. Coolidge lived in Chicago until 1900, when he returned to Boston. His partner Shepley died in 1903, and Rutan became disabled in 1912. In 1914 Coolidge dissolved the partnership with Rutan, who died soon after, and in 1915 formed new partnerships with George C. Shattuck in Boston and Charles Hodgdon in Chicago. In 1924, following Shattuck's death, the Boston firm became known as Coolidge, Shepley, Bulfinch & Abbott. Coolidge retired from the Chicago partnership in 1930, but continued to direct the Boston firm until his death.

Major works completed by his firms during his lifetime included the Stanford University campus (1891 and 1906), the Ames Building (1893), South Station (1899) and Boston Children's Hospital (1914) in Boston, Art Institute of Chicago (1893) and Chicago Cultural Center (1897) and Hutchinson Commons (1903) and the Harper Memorial Library (1912) of the University of Chicago in Chicago, the John Carter Brown Library of Brown University (1904), the Harvard Medical School (1906) and Harvard Memorial Church (1932) for Harvard University and the Rockefeller University campus and New York Hospital (1932) in New York City. Abroad they designed the United States pavilion at the Paris Exposition (1900), the American College for Girls campus (1914) in Istanbul and the Peking Union Medical College campus (1920) in Beijing, the latter in association with Shattuck and Hussey.

== Personal life ==
Coolidge was married in 1889 to Julia Shepley of St. Louis, sister of his business partner. They had four children: Mary Shepley Coolidge (1892–1988, married first Edwin F. Atkins Jr., second Gordon S. Rentschler), Isabel Coolidge (1893–1989, married Thomas Cunningham), Charles Allerton Coolidge Jr. (1894–1987, married Allison Jones) and Julia Shepley Coolidge (1896–1982, married Frederick Deane). One of his grandsons, Daniel Jones Coolidge (1924–1992), was an architect who practiced with Shepley, Bulfinch, Richardson & Abbott from 1954 until his retirement in 1990. Julia (Shepley) Coolidge died in 1935. He died April 1, 1936, in Locust Valley, New York, at the home of his daughter, Mrs. Rentschler.

Coolidge was a member, and later president, of the Boston Society of Architects and joined the American Institute of Architects in 1889 as a Fellow. He was a member of the Boston Architectural Club, the Chicago Club, the Somerset Club and the University Club of New York, among other organizations. He was a trustee of the American Academy in Rome and the Art Institute of Chicago.

In 1900 Coolidge was made a Chevalier of the Legion of Honor for his work at the Paris Exposition.

Coolidge and his firm frequently worked for Harvard University. In 1906, when the firm's Harvard Medical School was dedicated, Coolidge was awarded an Honorary Doctor of Arts. He also served as a lecturer in architecture from 1906 to 1908 and 1912 to 1913, a member of the planning board from 1921 and a member of the Harvard Board of Overseers from 1922 to 1928.

== See also ==
- Shepley Bulfinch
- Shepley, Rutan and Coolidge
