= Cypress–Emerson Historic District =

Historic district in Massachusetts, United States

- U.S. National Register of Historic Places
- U.S. Historic district
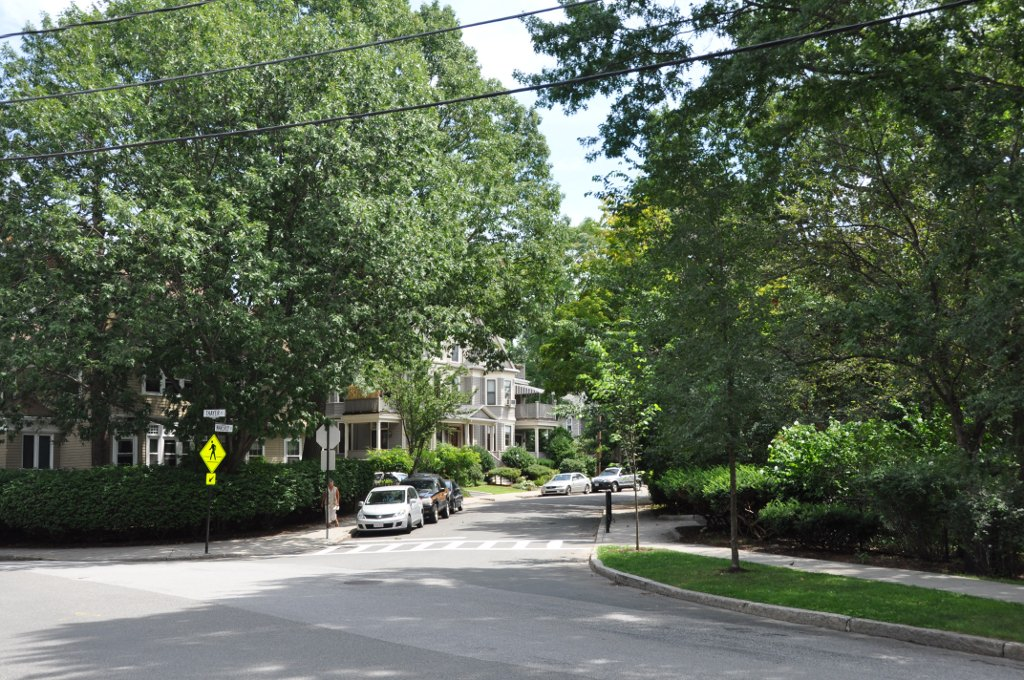
- Waverly Street near Emerson Park

- Location within Massachusetts Location within the United States
- Location: Roughly bounded by Waverly, Emerson, and Cypress Sts., Brookline, Massachusetts
- Coordinates: 42°19′58.38″N 71°7′21.02″W
- Architectural style: Late 19th and 20th century revivals, late Victorian
- MPS: Brookline MRA
- NRHP reference No.: 85003257
- Added to NRHP: October 17, 1985

The Cypress–Emerson Historic District encompasses a residential area on the west side of Brookline Village in Brookline, Massachusetts, United States. Centered on Waverly and Cypress Streets, and including Emerson Park, this area was developed in the post-Civil War era, its growth matching that of the commercial areas of the village. The district was listed on the National Register of Historic Places in 1985.

== Description and history ==
Brookline Village, originally known as "Muddy River" in colonial days, developed in the mid-19th century into the town's main commercial center. The area on the east side of Harvard Street commercial district was developed beginning in the 1840s by Thomas Aspinwall Davis, but the area to the west remained mainly farmland until after the Civil War. Cypress Street, an early road dating to the early 18th century, was widened in 1856, and the stretch between Davis Avenue and Washington Street was lined with houses in the 1880s, seven built by a single developer and reflecting similar Queen Anne and Second Empire styling. Waverly Street and Emerston Street were also developed in the 1870s and 1880s, on land belonging to Moses Jones and Elijah Emerson. Houses belonging to the Emerson family house original stood on the land that is now Emerson Park; they were moved to 72 Davis Avenue and 74 White Place after his heirs sold the town the land for the park.

The historic district consists of a section of Cypress Street roughly between Davis Avenue and Waverly Street, and a section of Waverly Street between Cypress and Davis, including Emerson Street and the Emerson Gardens park. Notable residences in the district include 109-111 Davis Avenue, which was the home of Charles Hercules Rutan, one of the principals of Shepley, Rutan and Coolidge; Rutan designed this house as well as two others on nearby Elm Street. The oldest house in the district, which predates its subdivision, is the 1827 Greek Revival house at 60 Waverly Street.

== See also ==
- National Register of Historic Places listings in Brookline, Massachusetts
