= Conant Hall =

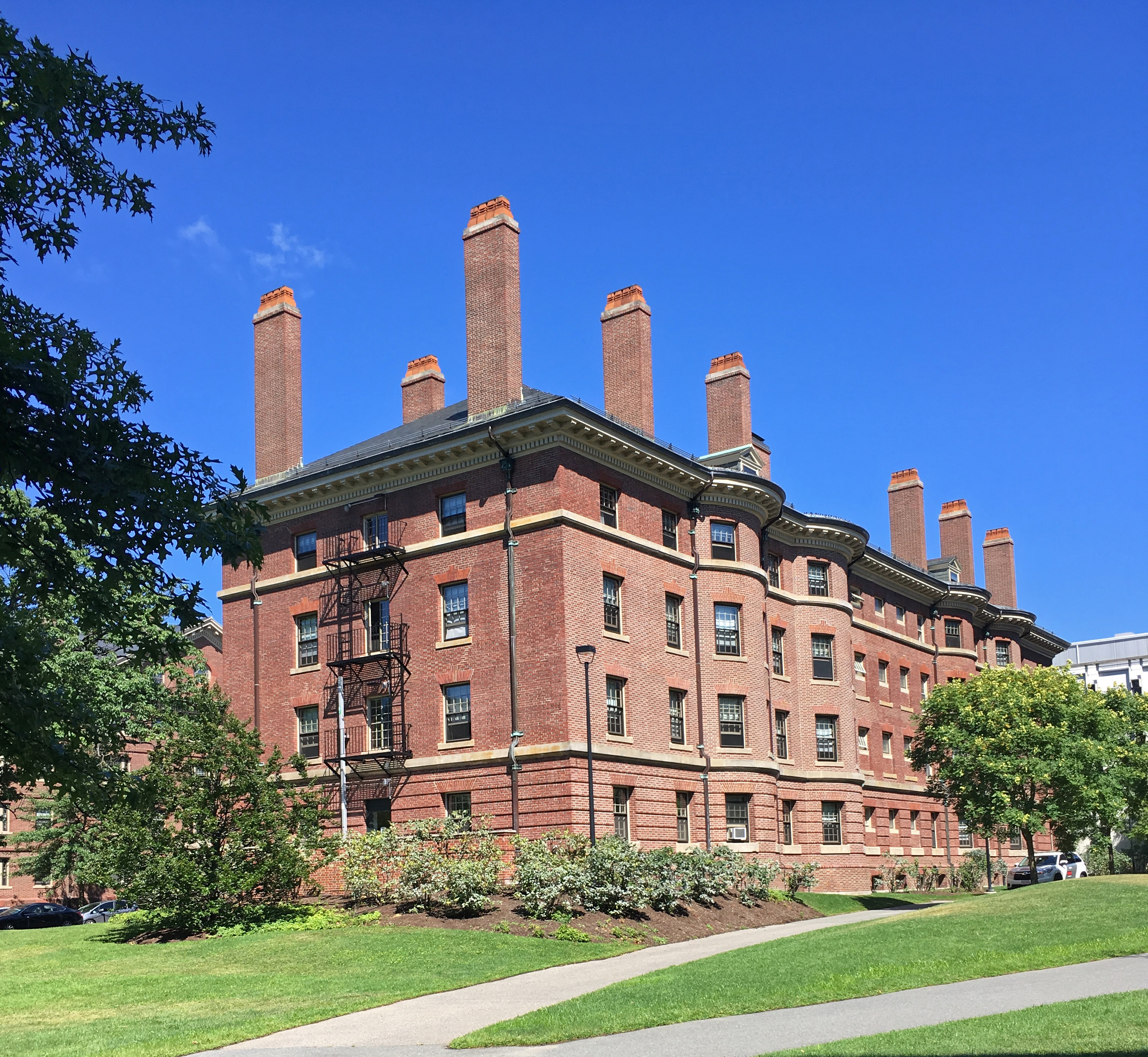
- Conant Hall, as seen from the direction of Harvard Museum of Natural History.
- Interactive map of the Conant Hall area

General information
- Architectural style: Georgian Revival
- Location: Harvard University, Cambridge, Massachusetts, 36 Oxford Street
- Coordinates: 42.37947°N 71.11625°W
- Completed: 1894
- Affiliation: Harvard Graduate School of Arts and Sciences

Design and construction
- Architecture firm: Shepley, Rutan and Coolidge

Other information
- Number of rooms: 84
- Parking: None

Conant Hall is one of several graduate student residence halls at Harvard University. It is affiliated with the Harvard Graduate School of Arts and Sciences (GSAS), which is responsible for the majority of Harvard's post-baccalaureate degree programs in the humanities, natural sciences, and social sciences.

An exemplar of the Georgian Revival architecture, Conant is recognizable by its thirteen high-rise chimneys, although the built-in fireplaces are no longer functional.

== History and style ==
Constructed in 1894, Conant Hall was designed by Shepley, Rutan and Coolidge and reflects the Georgian architecture of freshman residences found around Harvard Yard. It was built with funds gifted by Edwin Conant. Originally consisting of 29 suites, Conant has since undergone numerous renovations and currently houses 84 single rooms.

Conant Hall originally housed Harvard undergraduates, but in 1905 it was given over to graduate students. During World War I the building housed the students and post office annex of the United States Naval Radio School.
