= Edwin Conant =

American businessman (1810–1891)

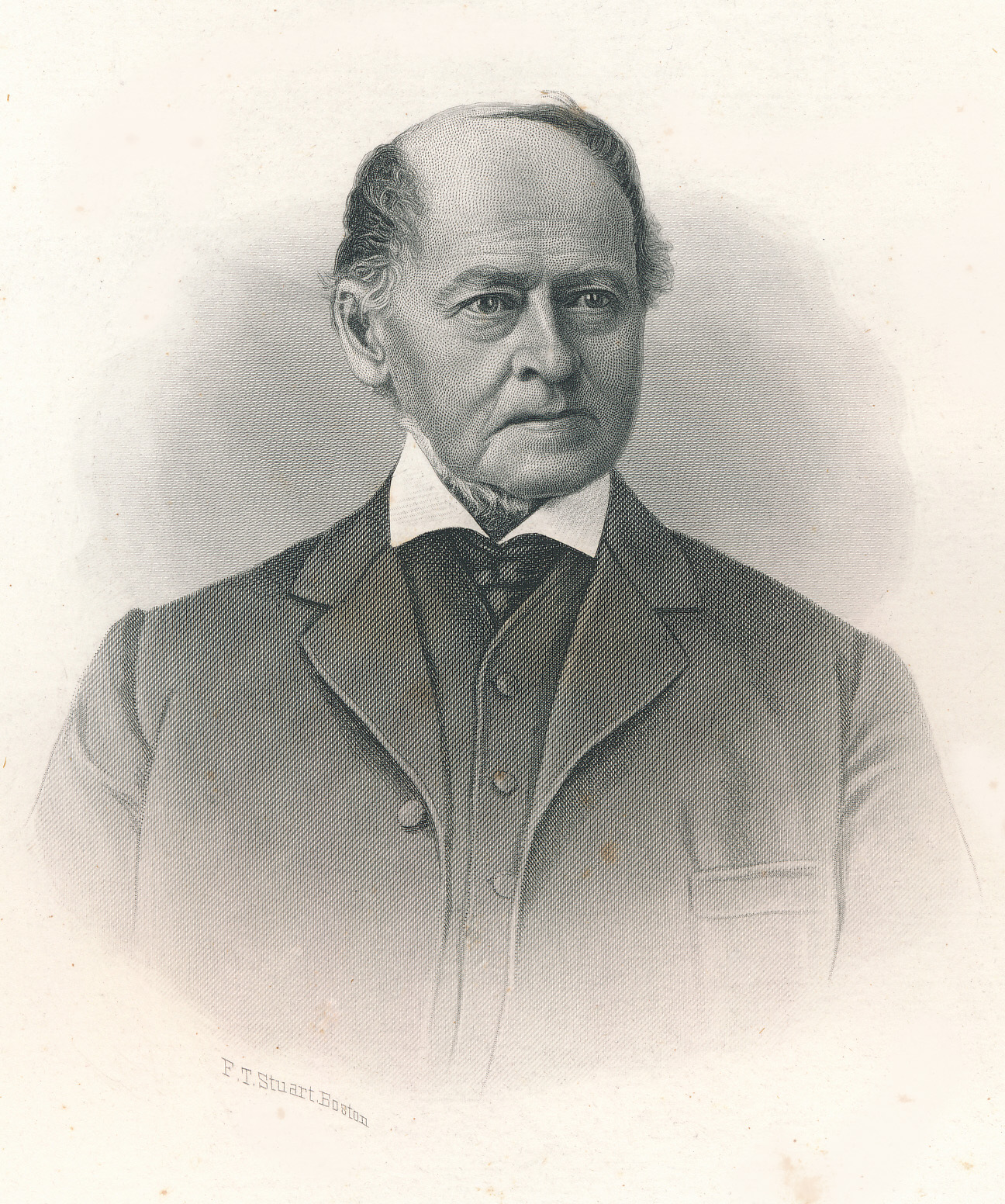
- (1810 - 1891)
- Born: Edwin Conant; August 20, 1810; Sterling, Massachusetts, U.S.
- Died: March 2, 1891; Worcester, Massachusetts, U.S.
- Resting place: Rural Cemetery (Worcester, Massachusetts)
- Education: Harvard University
- Occupations: Attorney, Justice of the Peace, Businessman, philanthropist

Edwin Conant (August 20, 1810 – March 2, 1891) was a businessman, lawyer and philanthropist who grew up in Sterling, Massachusetts, and later Worcester, Massachusetts. His name is associated with gifts he gave to the Town of Sterling and Harvard University: the Conant Public Library in Sterling as a memorial for his daughter Elizabeth, and Harvard's Conant Hall. He was a member of the famous Harvard Class of '29.

== Early life ==
He was the son of Jacob Conant and Relief Burpee Conant, daughter of Moses Burpee and Elizabeth Kendall Burpee. Father, Jacob was a businessman, farmer and Justice of the Peace representing Sterling, Massachusetts. Jacob provided Edwin with all the advantages of his wealth and stature. Edwin lost his mother December 26, 1814, when he was four years old. He lost his sister Elizabeth in 1816 when he was six. Conant attended public school in Sterling, Massachusetts, until he was 12 and transferred to Leicester Academy in preparation for college.

== Harvard University ==
In 1826, at the age of 16, he entered Harvard and graduated among the top of his class in 1829. He was one of the "Class of 1829", made famous by Oliver Wendell Holmes. During commencement exercises at Harvard in 1829 he participated in a conference on "Natural, Civil, Ecclesiastical, and Literary History, considered in relation to the Tendency of each to improve and elevate the Intellectual Faculty".

== Teaching in Sterling ==
Conant taught in Sterling, Massachusetts, at the Chocksett Hill School for two winter sessions during his tenure at Harvard and was asked to address the graduating class on February 24, 1829, at the close of winter studies. He referred to himself as "Old Master" in his written address. At the age of 19, he wrote:

This place has been to you the scene of many wayward frolic, of many a childish gam bob. You have here laughed and sported together year after year, caring only for the present, thoughtful of tomorrow and seemingly unconscious that you are never to be troubled with my cares beyond those of the present hour. I knew no other condition, I doubted not that the world was all friendly. But when I was torn from the companions of my childhood, and removed to a distance from kindred and home, and placed among strangers, I found, to my sad disappointment, that I was of little consequence to the world around me, and that none but myself cared for my comfort and welfare. Then it was that I learned to value the joys, and thousand social endearments of home. Then it was, that I learned duly to estimate the consolation which springs from the mature sympathy of school-fellows. Then, and not till then, did I know what it was to want a friend to smooth down the bed of sickness… For it is a law of nature, that we know not the worth of our enjoyments, until the time arrives when they are to be interrupted. Then, and not till then, do we feel the wants of them… I want you to reflect upon the many happy hours you have here enjoyed, that you may, in after years, when surrounded, perhaps with disease, and danger, and death, receive comfort and consolation by the retrospection. It will be so delightful, yet so deeply affecting, when old age is upon you, to tell over the scenes and the frolics of your school-boy days! I have been acquainted with many village schools, but none did I ever witness so much mutual good will, so great manifestations of true and sincere friendship, as I have witnessed in this. You have always seemed to me, to constitute one great Family; and I have often thought you are indeed a band of Brothers and Sisters! For my own part, having spent two winters with you, I am, and shall always be ready to bear testimony to your depth of sympathy and kindly feeling as friends, and your faithfulness and diligence as scholars. During the last winter, my attention was so strongly attracted by these qualities, and by the kindness with which I was uniformly treated, that I formed an attachment to you, which not ever time, but death alone can sever… And am I no more to have my ears greeted with the endearing title of Master? - a title which has always suggested to my mind, so many pleasing emotions! … Be assured, I shall not forget you.

== Law school ==
After being graduated from Harvard, Conant studied law with Rejoice Newton (1782-1868) and William Lincoln (1801-1843), author of History of Worcester, Massachusetts From Its Earliest Settlement to September 1836 and at the Harvard Law School in Cambridge.

== Independence Day Oration ==
On Independence Day, July 4, 1832, at the 51st anniversary of the Town of Sterling, Edwin addressed the Towns-people with an oration. He spoke:“...In the upright and honest discharge of public and private duty within our narrow spheres of action, let us do what we can to avert it. And if the cloud which some have been farsighted, or imaginative enough to believe is gathering over our heads, shall indeed burst in wrath upon us, let us not, like recreant sons of worthier sires, shrink from any exertion which liberty and country may demand at our hands. But may heaven grant, that that demand may never be made, that successive years may but harden and cement the temple which has been reared to freedom, that here the dominion of error may be constantly narrowed and the empire of light and truth extended, that the fair model we hold up for the world to admire and imitate may ever be kept in the freshness of original beauty, that so the consummation of mans highest earthly reign of equal laws and the rightful elevation of moral excellence.”

== Attorney ==
He returned to reside in Sterling briefly on September 19, 1832, and opened his law office. He was also appointed to the Division of the Militia of the Commonwealth of Massachusetts as Quarter Master by Levi Lincoln, the Governor of Massachusetts, an involvement he would honor for many years. During this period, his Father Jacob was serving in various official posts in Sterling government, which he did the last thirty years of his life. In 1833, Edwin Conant was promoted to Major with the Division of the Militia of the Commonwealth of Massachusetts by Governor Levi Lincoln.

Edwin took little time to establish himself in the Town and County and moved his residence and practice to Worcester in 1833. He purchased the estate of his former friend and Sterling resident, Isaac Goodwin, on Lincoln Street and later moved to a mansion at the corner of Harvard and State Street. After his death, the mansion was donated to the Natural History Society in 1891 (The Natural History Society changed its name to the Worcester Science Museum in 1960 and eventually the EcoTarium in 1998).

He was asked in November 1835 to deliver the dedicatory address for the dedication of the Town Hall (1835 Town Hall) which had just been completed.

In 1842, as part of a Board of Trustees, Edwin was appointed to the Board of the Worcester State Lunatic Hospital by Governor John Davis. The hospital was 10 years old.

== Marriage and family ==
Maria Estabrook (daughter of Joseph and Ruth Estabrook of Royalston, became Edwin's first wife in 1833. They had two children, Elizabeth Ann Conant in 1835 and Helen Maria Conant in 1837.

On December 24, 1837, his youngest daughter Helen died 7 months after she was born. Edwin's Father Jacob, then Treasurer for the Town of Sterling, also died in 1837.

Maria, Edwin's wife, was the next to perish. She died at the age of 35 on August 22, 1848, two days after Edwin's 38th Birthday. Edwin married again on January 29, 1850. His second wife, Elizabeth S. Wheeler, was the daughter of a Unitarian Reverend, Joseph Wheeler Jr. of Harvard. They were married for 29 years; she died in 1879. After his second wife died, Edwin was left with only one immediate family member, his daughter Elizabeth Ann. She took over the caring of the household and lived with her father all of her life.

=== Death of Elizabeth Ann ===
Elizabeth Ann Conant died on December 4, 1883, at the age of 48. The Worcester Spy reported "A light has gone out in many hearts with the death of Miss Conant, and some of us, even outside her home, cannot but feel that life is less worth living in her absence… In her was found a rare union of common and uncommon sense, of judgment in practical affairs, and thoughtful interest in the intellectual and spiritual questions which concern us all most deeply, of constant, untiring devotion to home duties, and earnest activity in helping the needy abroad, of a warm heart and quick sympathies, with a clear, penetrating, and cultivated intellect. To all these were added vivacity and courage, with a vein of fun also, which made her society a delight."

== Conant Public Library ==
After Elizabeth's death, Edwin Conant donated a 100-acre (40 ha) parcel of land he owned in Holden to the inhabitants of Sterling, the proceeds of which were to be used to begin erecting a memorial building in his daughter's name. When all was said and done, Edwin donated more than $6,000 to construct the Conant Public Library.

The memorial address, by E. H. Hall ends with; “Why may we not hope that her pure presence will always be felt within the walls which to-day we dedicate, and touch with finer influence all that goes forth from them on errands of enlightenment and cheer?”

There are numerous letters of sympathy in Edwin Conant's files. Received between Elizabeth's death in 1883 and the dedication of the Library in 1886. Pictures of Elizabeth along with the Memorial booklet were mailed to friends of Conant. These letters were treasured to the end of his life.

After 1883, Edwin Conant was ill for many years. The death of his daughter, the last member of his immediate family did much to bring about his decline in health. He continued to live in his mansion on State Street in Worcester. At his side all these later years was his nurse, Henry K. Cady, who was also at his side at his funeral.

Edwin Conant died on March 2, 1891. He had been the oldest living member of the Worcester County Bar. His modest funeral was attended by noted Worcester businessman and politicians as well as a contingency from Sterling including Osgood, Bartlett, Heywood, Kendall, Fitch, Wilder, Brown and Houghton (the Sterling attendees were 1/2 hour late due to a train delay).

At a special session of the superior court of Worcester, in his memory, Attorney H.E. Hill, Col. Williams and A.P. Rugg held a memorial service. Judge Emory Aldrich said, “He was a man of rare qualities of mind… There is no man in the city that I know who is possessed of so many noble qualities and of so much wealth, who was little known in the community at large, as was Mr. Conant. He was highly spoken of by his neighbor. I regarded my acquaintance with him as an honor… His rare intelligence, cultivated mind and dignified manner marked him. He was one of the most self-contained men I ever met.”

The retelling of his time with us would not be complete without the words of Oliver Wendell Holmes who wrote “A Story of Twenty Nine”. The concluding verses were:

As nearer still and nearer
The Fatal stars appear,
The living shall be dearer
With each encircling year
Till a few old men shall say,
“We remember ‘tis the day -
Let it pass with a glass
For the Class of ‘29”

As one by one is falling
Beneath the leaves of snows,
Each memory still recalling,
The broken ring shall close,
Till the night winds softly pass
O’er the green and growing grass,
Where it waves on the graves
Of the Boys of ‘29
