= New London Public Library =

- Public Library of New London
- U.S. National Register of Historic Places
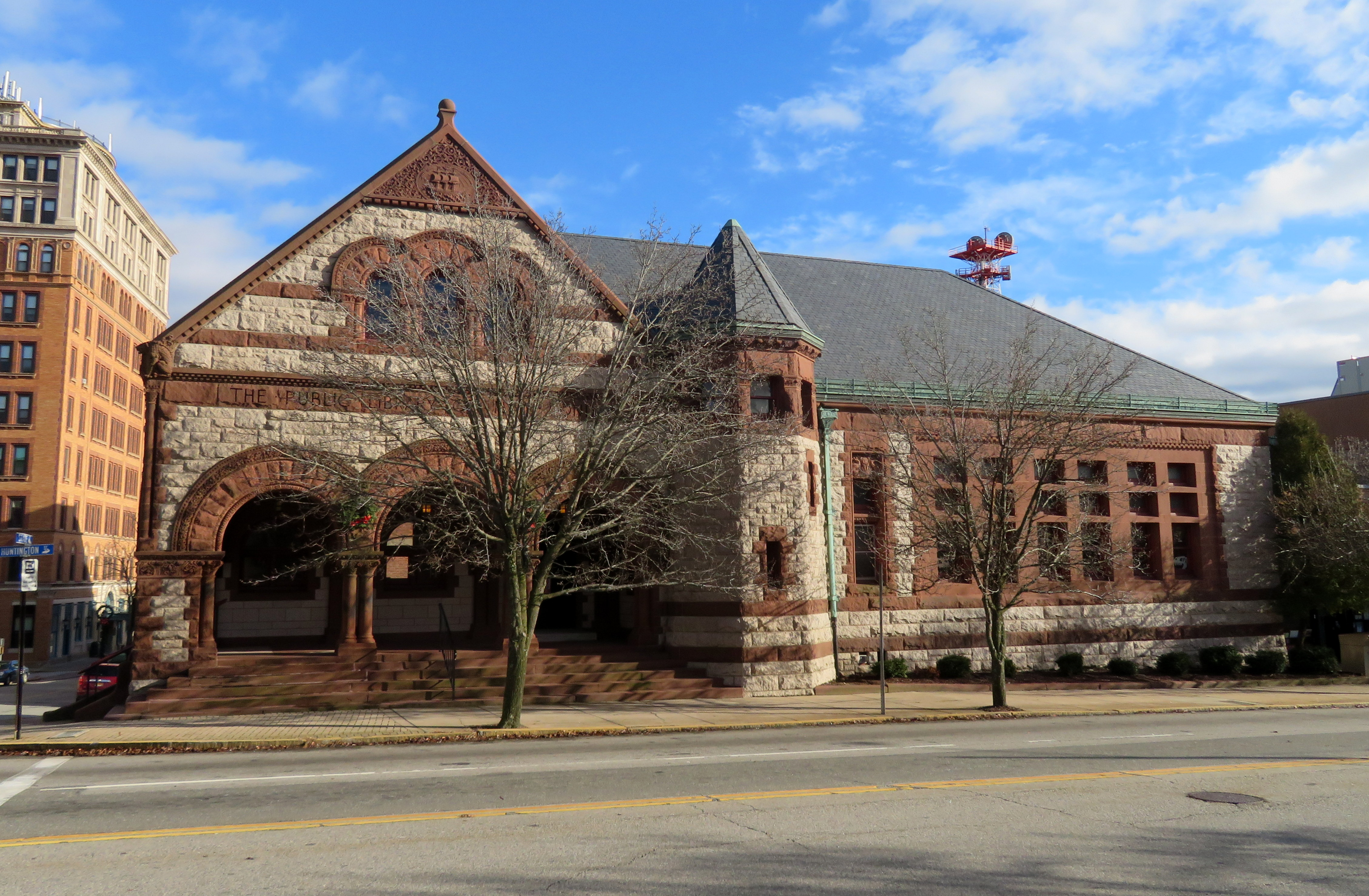
- New London Public Library in December 2018

- Location within Connecticut Location within the United States
- Location: 63 Huntington Street; New London, Connecticut
- Coordinates: 41°21′18″N 72°6′0″W
- Built: 1889–92
- Architect: Shepley, Rutan and Coolidge; George Warren Cole, project supervisor
- Architectural style: Richardsonian Romanesque
- NRHP reference No.: 70000712
- Added to NRHP: October 15, 1970

The Public Library of New London is a historic library located at 63 Huntington Street at the corner of State Street, New London, Connecticut. The library was given to the city by Henry Philemon Haven. It was constructed in 1889–1892 and was designed by Shepley, Rutan and Coolidge in the Richardsonian Romanesque style; George Warren Cole was the project supervisor.

The building was added to the National Register of Historic Places in 1970.

== Design ==
Whaling merchant Henry P. Haven died in 1876, and his money was to be split among his three children. However, his son Thomas had died, so Thomas' portion was put into a trust to be used for "charitable and benevolent purposes". The trustees of the Haven inheritance secured a charter in 1882 for a public library, and they hired Shepley, Rutan and Coolidge of Boston to design it.

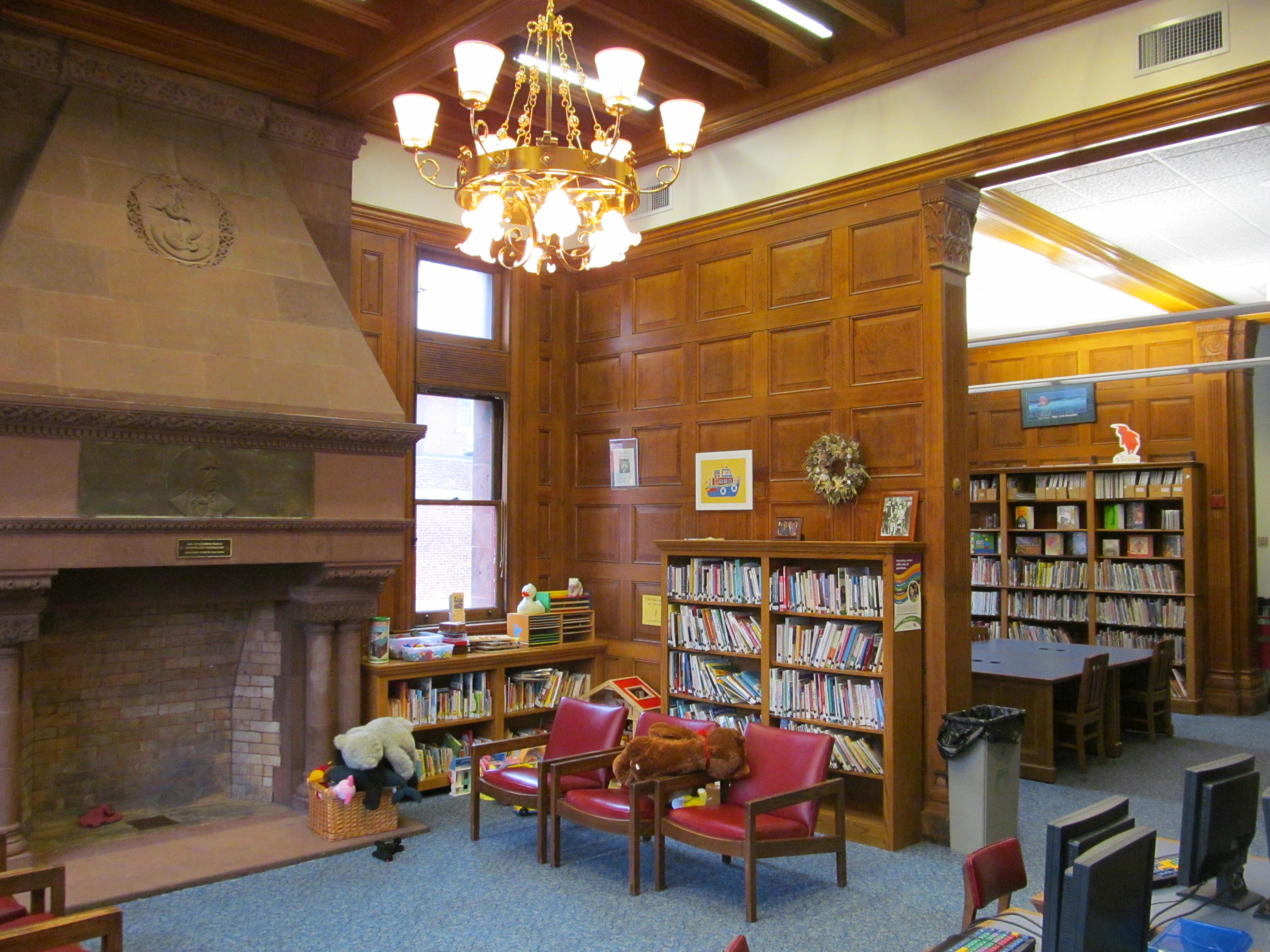
The Children's Room

Shepley, Rutan and Coolidge were the successors to architect Henry Hobson Richardson, and they worked from Richardson's preliminary designs in order to retain the popular Richardsonian architecture that is found in other libraries. The firm sent George Warren Cole to be the project supervisor. Cole also served as the supervisor of the Williams Memorial Institute and the Nathan Hale School. Work commenced in 1889 and it was completed and opened by July 1891.

== Alteration and expansion ==
The 1970 National Register of Historic Places nomination states that the building had not been altered with "one possible exception of an elevator" which seemed to date from the nineteenth century but "does not appear in the plans." However, the library added a 15,000 square foot extension in 1974. Further renovations increased the space for administrative offices and collections, concluding in March 2001. The Children's area and meeting rooms also underwent renovations in 2006.

== See also ==
- National Register of Historic Places listings in New London County, Connecticut
