= Bell Telephone Building (St. Louis, Missouri) =

- U.S. National Register of Historic Places
- St. Louis Landmark
- Bell Telephone Building as depicted in American Architect and Building News (January 1889)

- Location within St. Louis Location within Missouri Location within the United States
- Location: 920 Olive Street; St. Louis, Missouri
- Coordinates: 38°37′43.94″N 90°11′40.23″W
- Built: 1889
- Architect: Shepley, Rutan and Coolidge
- Architectural style: Romanesque Revival
- NRHP reference No.: 99000936
- Added to NRHP: August 5, 1999

The Bell Telephone Building, located at 920 Olive Street in downtown St. Louis, Missouri, was built in 1889 to house the switchboard and local headquarters of the Bell Telephone Company. It may have been the first building built for the telephone industry in St. Louis; regardless, it served as the city's main telephone exchange until 1926 and remains the city's oldest extant telephone building.

== History and restoration ==
The earliest St. Louis telephone exchange was installed in 1878 in the National Bank Building at 417 Olive (since demolished). By the late 1880s, a dedicated telephone exchange facility was needed. Ground was broken in 1889 after the acceptance of the Boston-based Shepley, Rutan and Coolidge design, and the final construction cost was $154,225. The main switchboard room was at the top of the then-six-story building. Between 1890 and 1910, telephone use expanded dramatically, and the local St. Louis Bell Company merged with other Bell telephone companies to form Southwestern Bell by 1920. In 1923, Southwestern Bell absorbed the local St. Louis telephone competitor, Kinloch Telephone. Needing more space, the company built the Southwestern Bell Building nearby, and moved there upon its completion in 1926.

The old Bell Telephone Building found use as a retail and warehouse facility for S.G. Adams Stationery, a print company. S.G. Adams was purchased by Comfort Printing in 1959 but retained its name. From the 1960s to the 1980s, the building housed S.G. Adams' flagship store. In the 1990s, the company refocused its business model on commercial printing and closed its retail locations. The Bell Telephone Building, the last to be closed, was vacated in 1994.

Between 1999 and 2004, the building was renovated to create residential loft apartments on upper floors and commercial retail at ground level. One of the early ground-level tenants was City Grocers, a specialty market that also dealt in necessities for downtown condo and loft dwellers; it was the only grocery store in downtown St. Louis from its opening in 2004 until the opening of a Schnucks supermarket at Olive and 9th streets in 2009. Upper floors of the building continue to be used as residential apartments under the operation of St. Louis LoftWorks

== Architecture ==
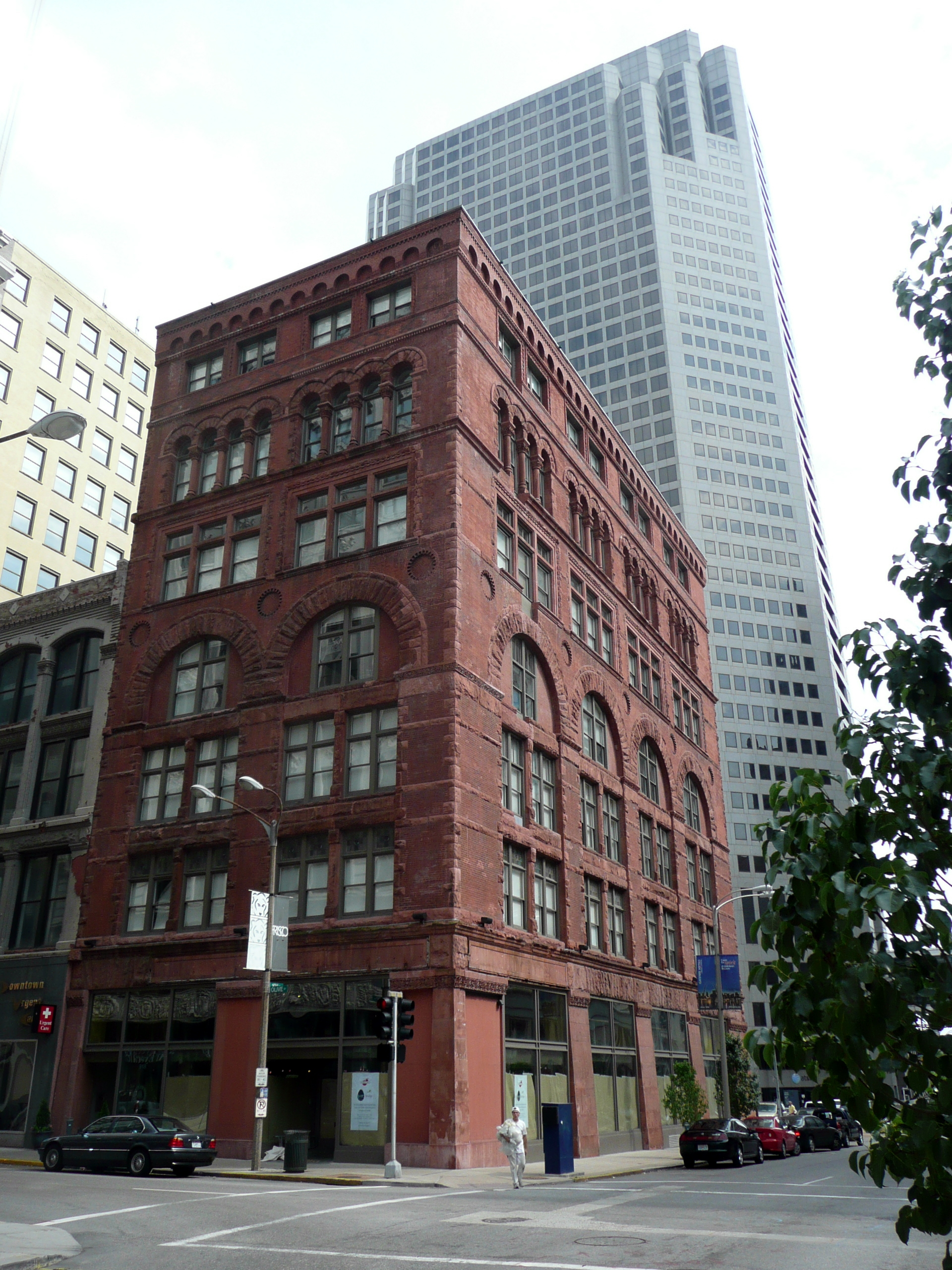
Bell Telephone Building

The building is a seven-story commercial building of brick and red sandstone, with three-story arcades rising from the ground-level storefronts. The building originally was built with six stories, while a seventh was added in the same style as the lower levels in 1919 to meet rising demands for space. In 1940, a limestone sheath covered the original storefronts after the building was purchased by S.G. Adams. The eastern wall of the building is blank brick and rises above a neighboring four-story building. The roof is flat, while a parapet wall surrounds the building on all sides.

Bell Telephone primarily is significant for its rarity in St. Louis architecture. Most downtown Romanesque Revival buildings were demolished during the 20th century, with some notable exceptions (such as the Cupples Station warehouse complex). It also is one of only a handful of buildings in St. Louis designed by either Henry Hobson Richardson or his successor firm Shepley, Rutan and Coolidge.
