= Charles Hercules Rutan =

American architect

Charles Hercules Rutan FAIA
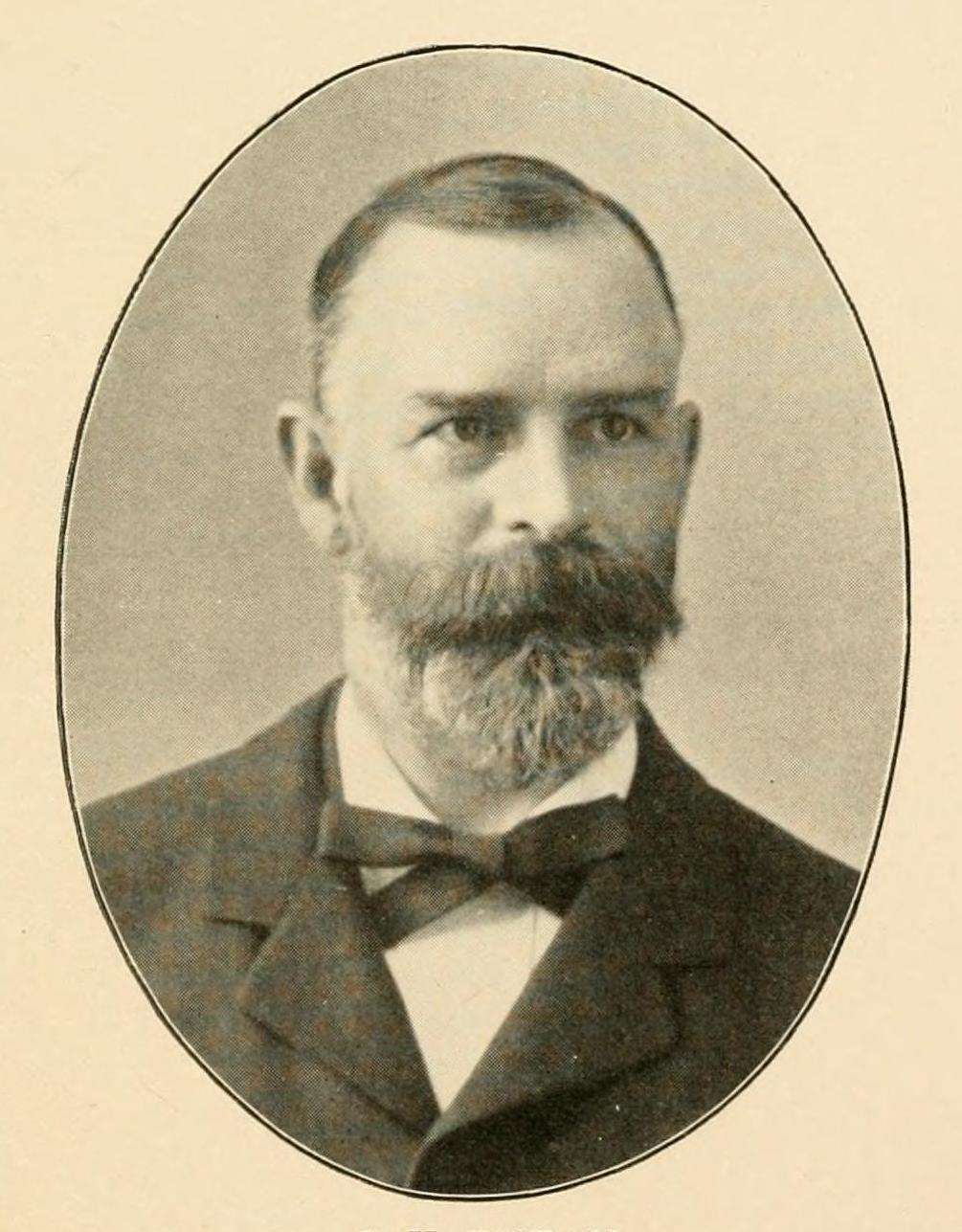
- Charles H. Rutan, c. 1903
- Born: March 28, 1851; Newark, New Jersey, U.S.
- Died: December 17, 1914 (aged 63); Brookline, Massachusetts, U.S.
- Occupation: Architect
- Practice: Shepley, Rutan and Coolidge

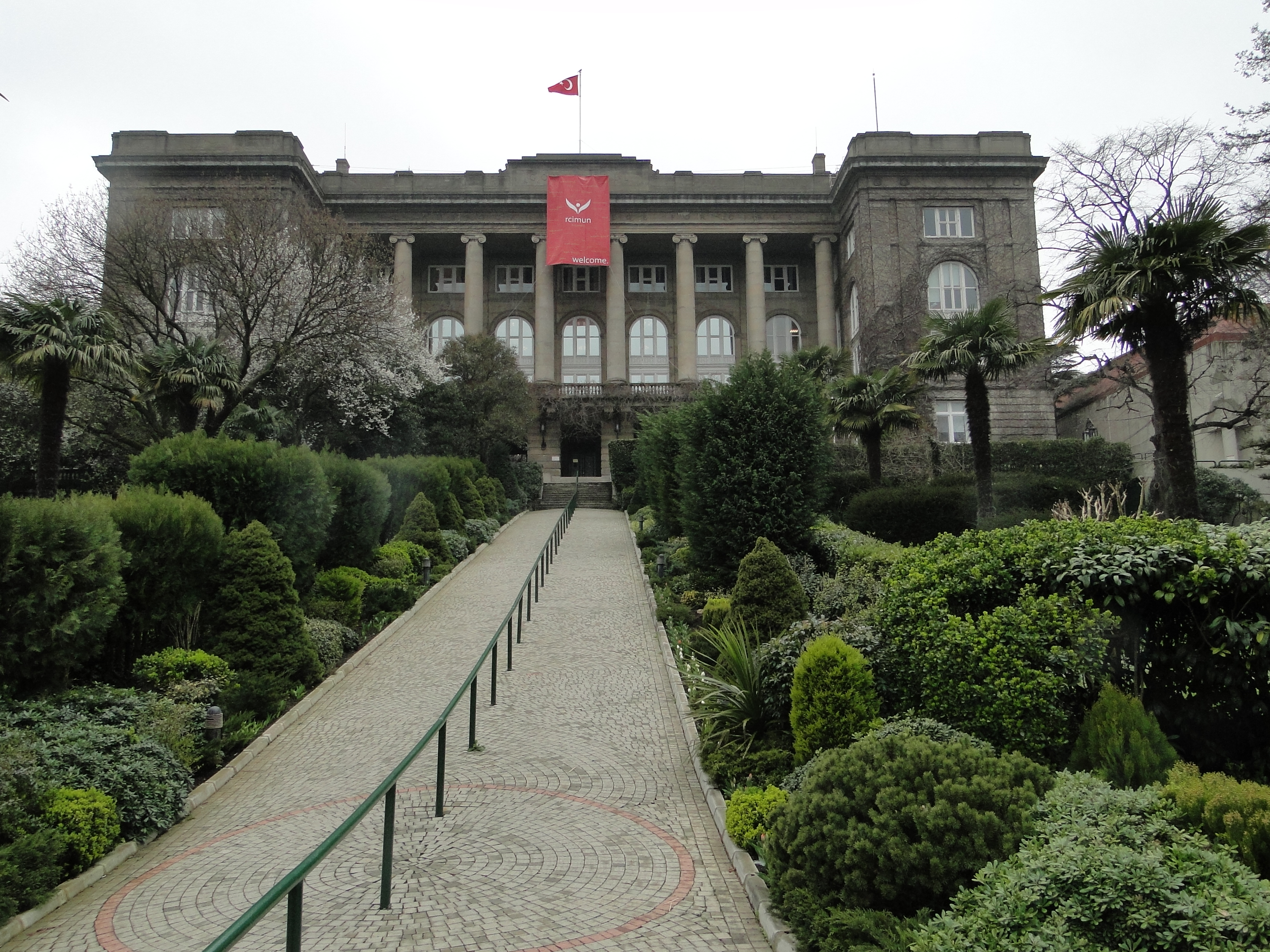
Gould Hall of the American College for Girls, now Robert College. Designed by Shepley, Rutan & Coolidge, begun in 1911 and completed in 1914.

Charles Hercules Rutan FAIA (March 28, 1851 – December 17, 1914) was an American architect best known as a partner in the firm of Shepley, Rutan & Coolidge of Boston and Chicago, successors to the firm of architect Henry Hobson Richardson.

== Life and career ==
Charles Hercules Rutan was born in Newark, New Jersey to Nicholas Warren Rutan and Sarah Elizabeth (Marsh) Rutan. He was educated in the Newark public schools. In 1870 he joined the New York City office of Gambrill & Richardson as an office boy, gradually moving up to engineer and construction superintendent. When Richardson moved to Brookline, Massachusetts in 1874, so did Rutan, and stayed with him when he dissolved his partnership with Gambrill in 1878. When Richardson died in April 1886 Rutan and two other senior employees, George Foster Shepley and Charles Allerton Coolidge, took charge of the studio and its uncompleted work. In June 1886 the three formed a formal partnership, Shepley, Rutan & Coolidge, to succeed to Richardson's practice, and in 1887 moved the office to Boston. Rutan withdrew from active practice later in life, but remained a partner in the firm until December 1, 1914, shortly before his death.

Rutan was a member of the Boston Society of Architects and joined the American Institute of Architects in 1889 as a Fellow. He was a member of the Congregational Club. At different times he was also treasurer and trustee of the American College for Girls in Istanbul, for which Shepley, Rutan & Coolidge designed buildings, and trustee of Fisk University in Nashville.

== Personal life ==
Rutan was married in 1874 to Sarah Ellen Brower of Bloomfield, New Jersey, with whom he had one son and two daughters. Rutan suffered two debilitating strokes in 1912, after which he was unable to work. He died December 17, 1914, in Brookline, Massachusetts.

Rutan's second daughter, Elsie Rutan, was married in 1905 to Sidney T. Strickland, an employee of Shepley, Rutan & Coolidge. After Rutan's death, Strickland went on to form the firm of Strickland & Law, later Strickland, Blodget & Law, architects of the former Ritz-Carlton Boston in 1927.

In 1889 Rutan designed and had built a large home at 111 Davis Avenue in Brookline for his family. He lived there until his disability, when he and his wife moved to a Boylston Street apartment. After Rutan's death his widow believed that the partnership had been unfairly dissolved, and sued for compensation. It was found that several months before the official dissolution the Chicago office had ceased to pay Rutan his share of the profits, and Mrs. Rutan was awarded part of this sum. There had, however, been a breakdown in the relationship between Mrs. Rutan and Coolidge, and when she built a new home in 1916, at 37 Hedge Road in Brookline, it was designed by her son-in-law. Mrs. Rutan died in 1933.

== See also ==
- Shepley Bulfinch
- Shepley, Rutan and Coolidge
