= Shepley Bulfinch =

Architectural firm in Boston

Shepley Bulfinch Richardson & Abbott Inc
- Formerly: Shepley, Rutan and Coolidge; Coolidge and Shattuck; Coolidge Shepley Bulfinch and Abbott; Shepley Bulfinch Richardson and Abbott
- Type: Private
- Industry: Architecture; Planning; Interior Design
- Founded: 1874; 152 years ago in Boston, United States
- Founder: Henry Hobson Richardson
- Headquarters: Boston, Massachusetts
- Number of locations: 5 offices
- Website: https://shepleybulfinch.com/

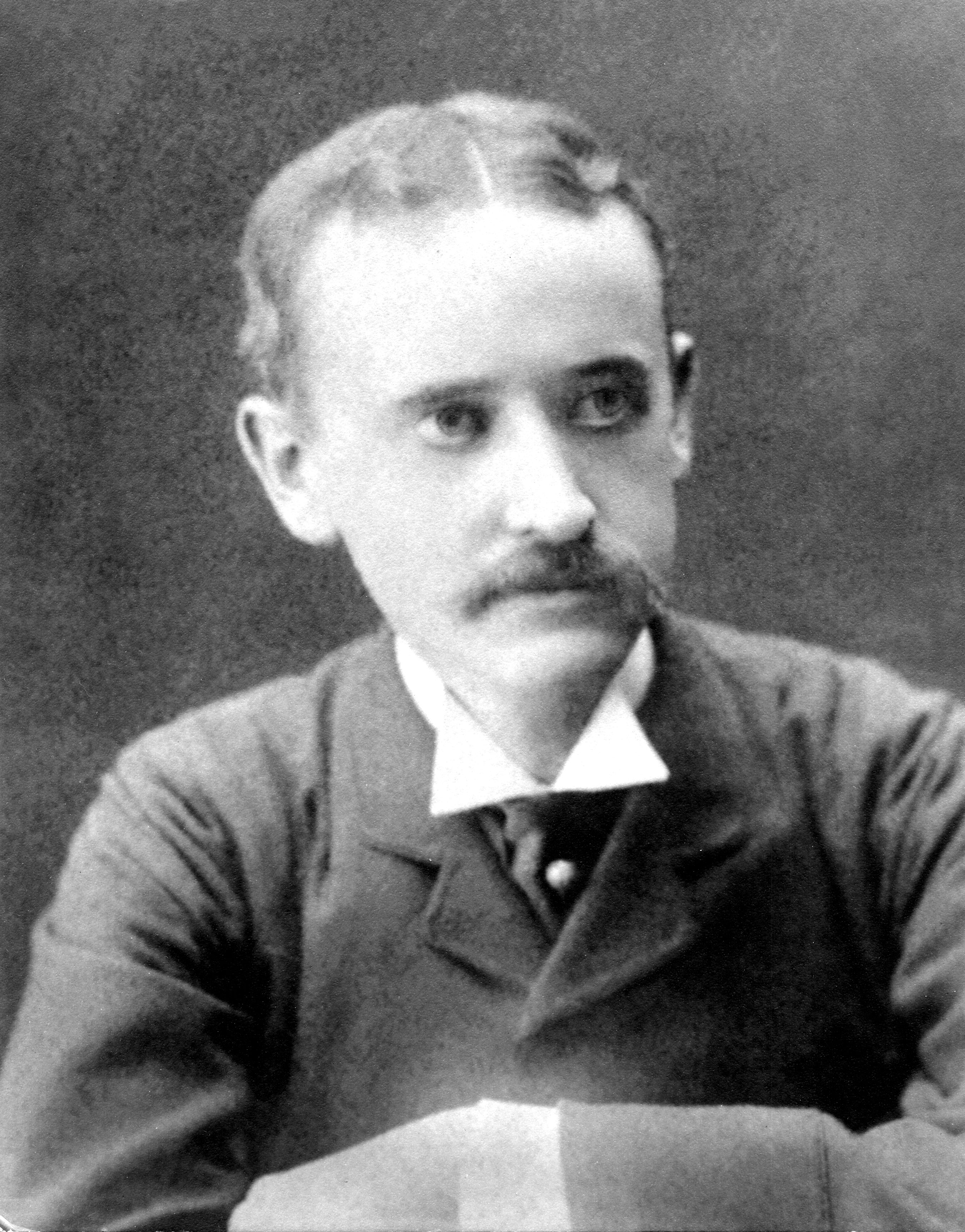
George Foster Shepley

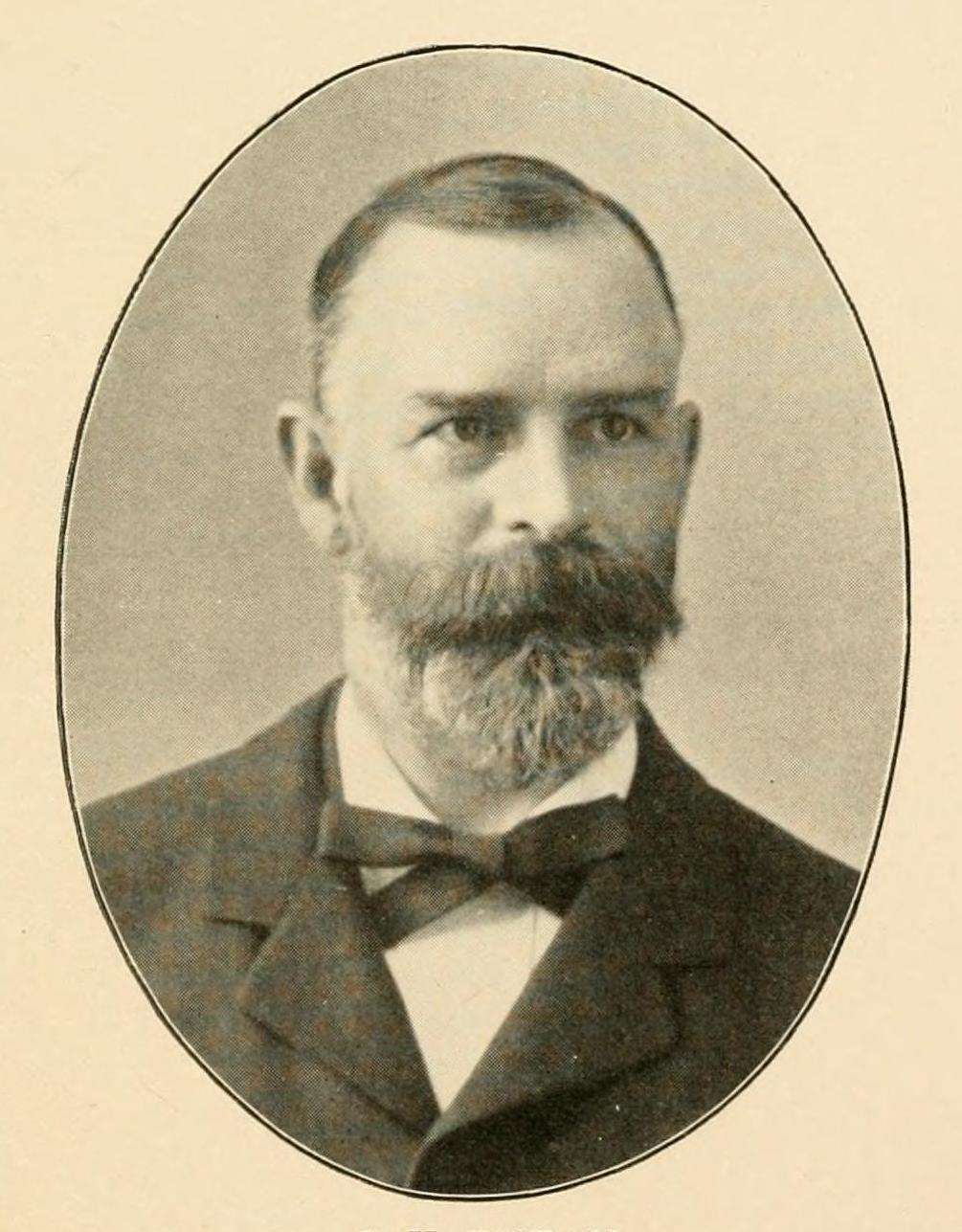
Charles Hercules Rutan

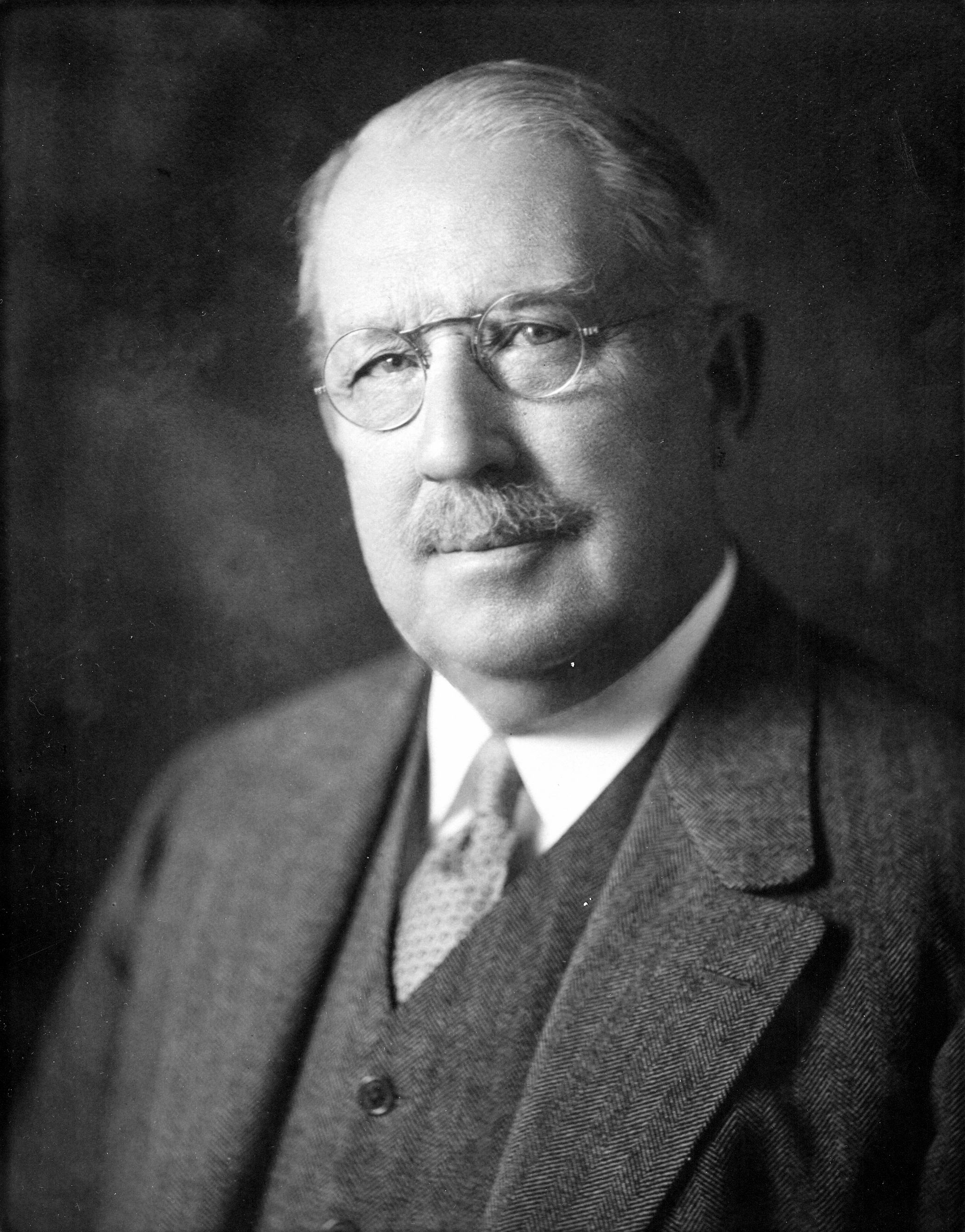
Charles Allerton Coolidge

The firm was previously known as Shepley, Rutan and Coolidge.

Shepley Bulfinch (Shepley Bulfinch Richardson & Abbott Inc.) is an international architecture, planning, and interior design firm with offices in Boston, Durham, Hartford, Houston, and Phoenix. It is one of the oldest architecture firms in continuous practice in the United States, and was recognized by the American Institute of Architects with its highest honor, the AIA Architecture Firm Award, in 1973.

Shepley Bulfinch was formed in Boston in 1874 as the architectural practice of American architect Henry Hobson Richardson. Following Richardson's death in 1886, the firm existed as Shepley, Rutan and Coolidge through 1915, then became Coolidge and Shattuck from 1915 through 1924, Coolidge Shepley Bulfinch and Abbott from 1924 through 1952, and Shepley Bulfinch Richardson and Abbott from 1952.

== History ==
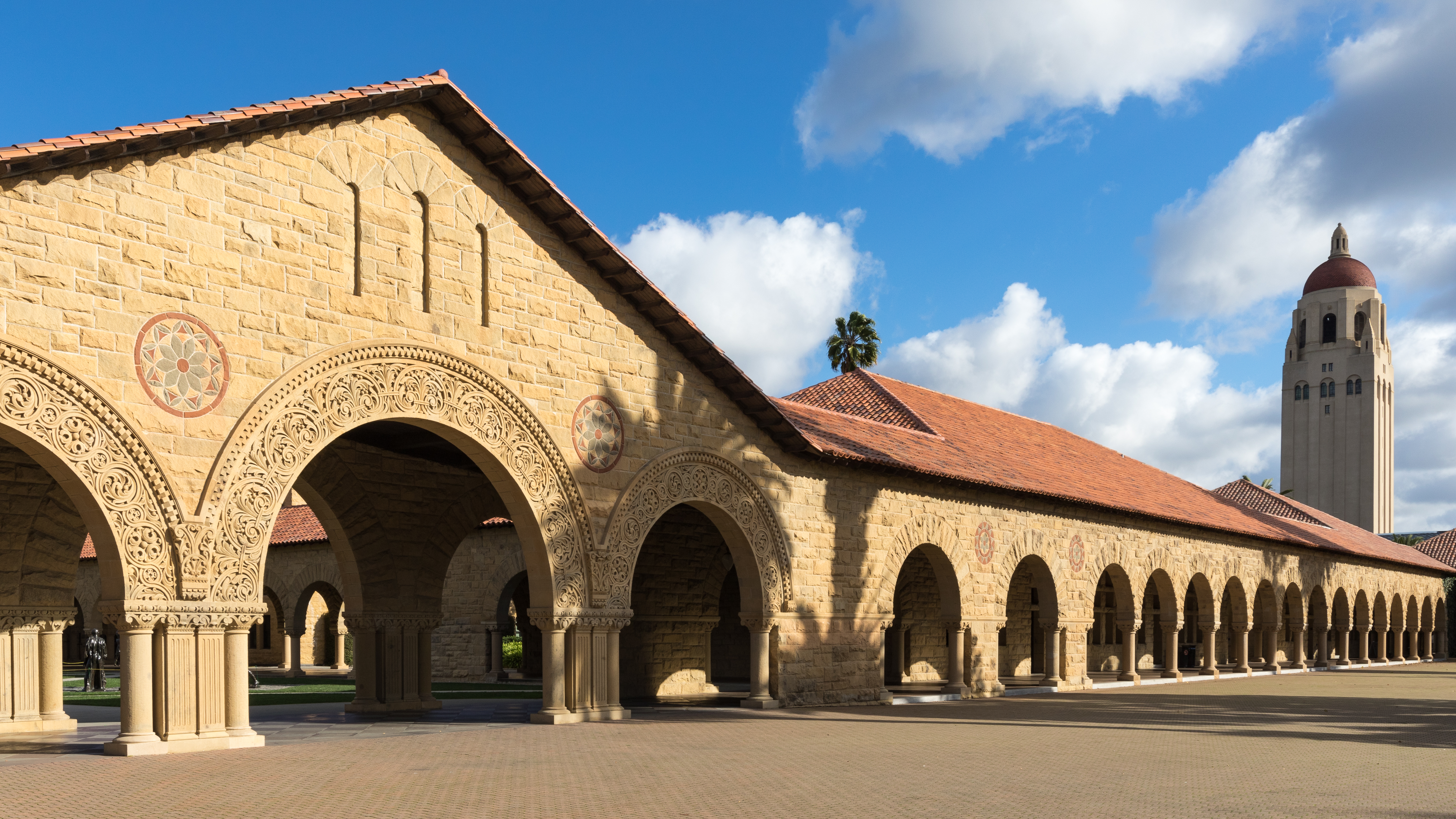
The inner quad of Stanford University, designed by Shepley, Rutan & Coolidge in the Richardsonian Romanesque style and completed in 1891.

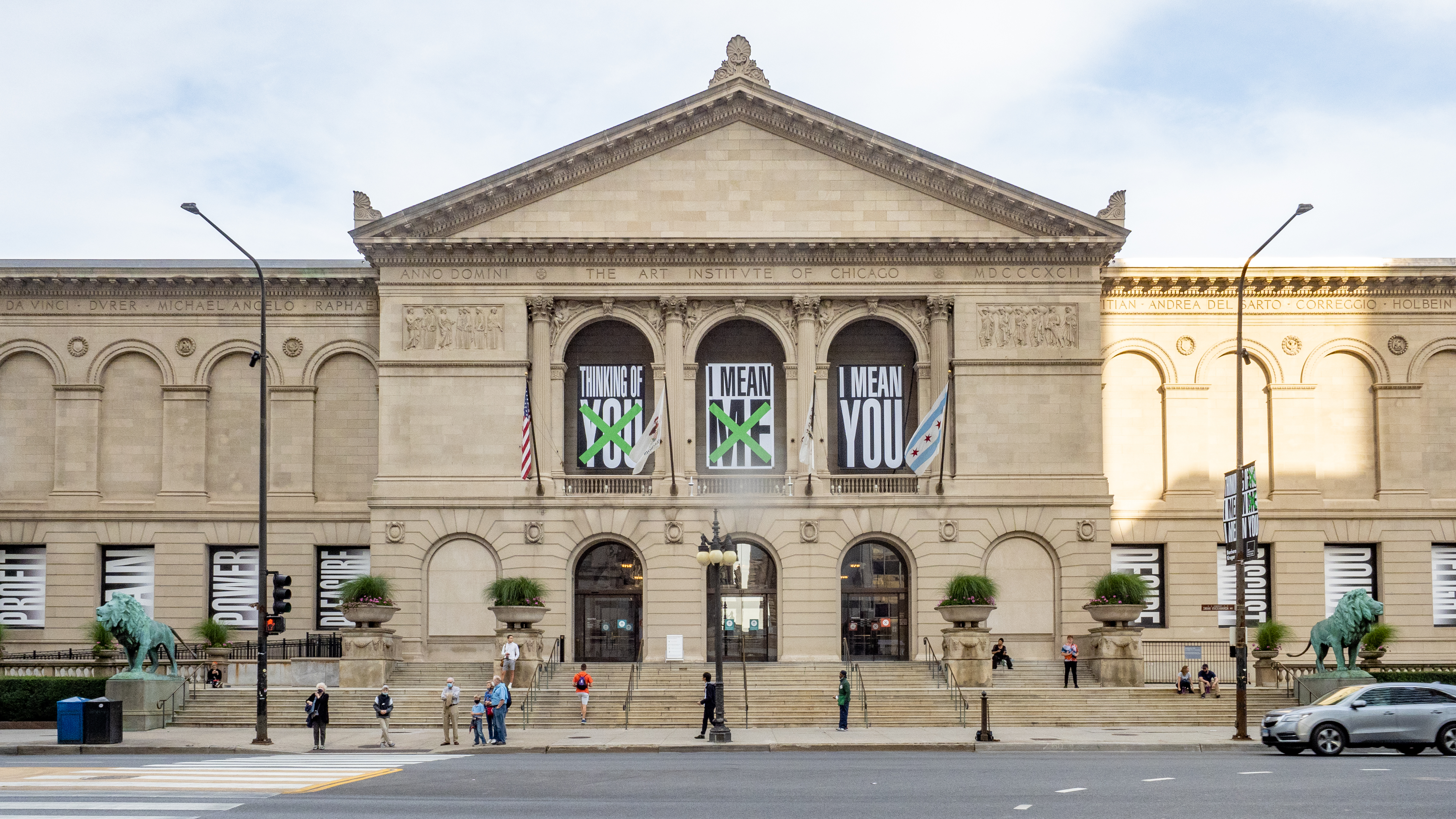
The Art Institute of Chicago Building, designed by Shepley, Rutan & Coolidge in the Neoclassical style and completed in 1893.

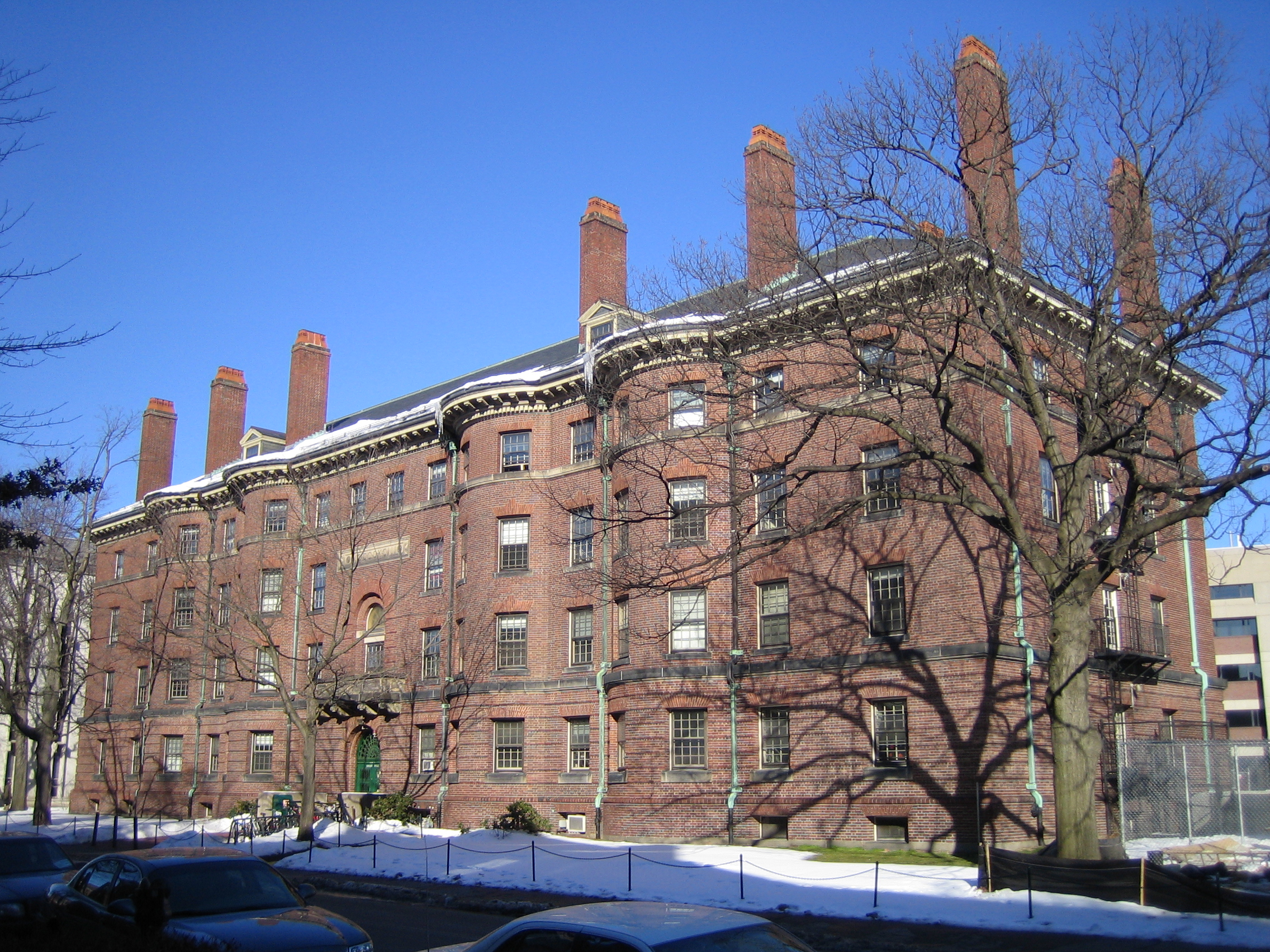
Conant Hall of Harvard University, designed by Shepley, Rutan & Coolidge in the Colonial Revival style and completed in 1894.

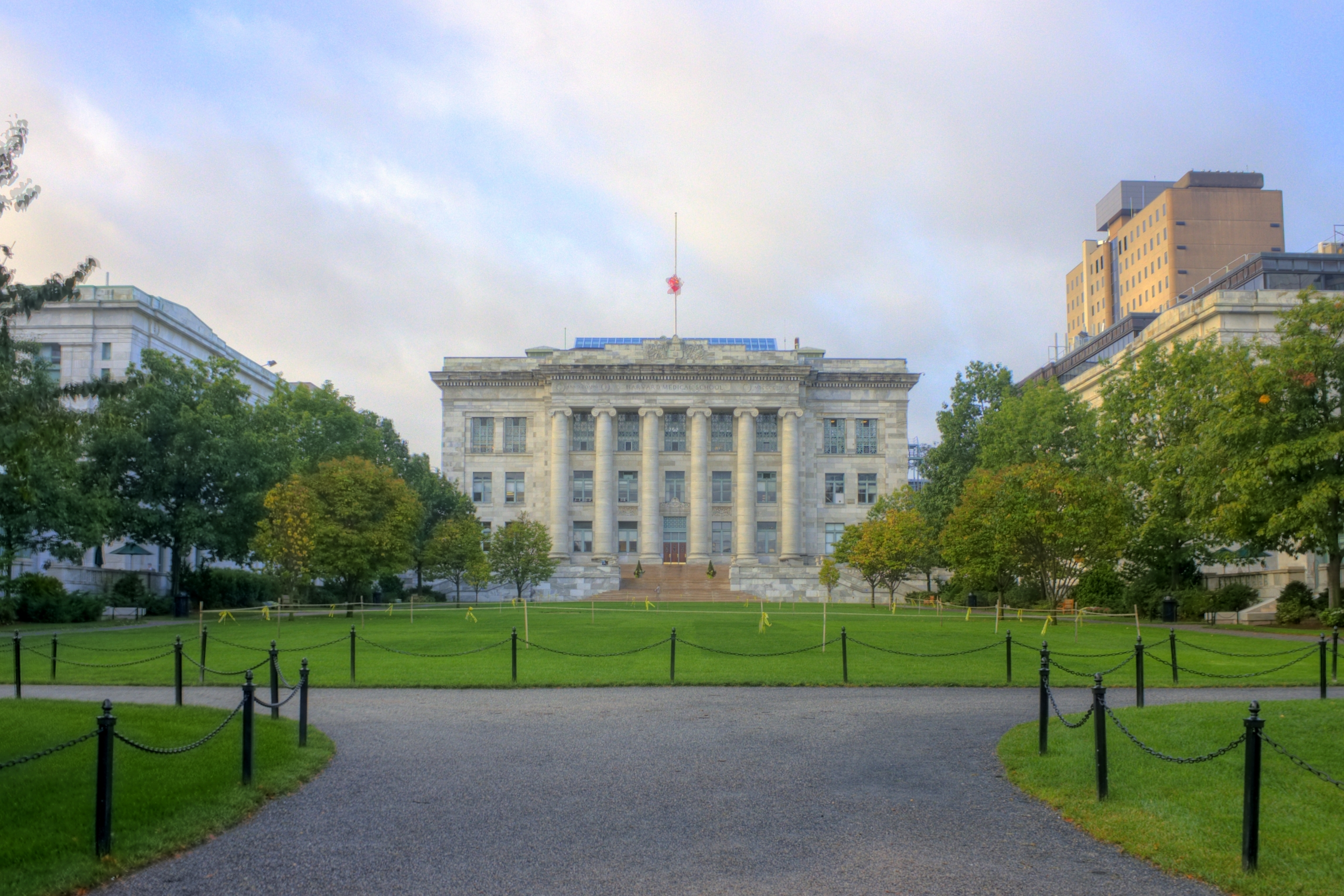
The Harvard Medical School, designed by Shepley, Rutan & Coolidge in the Neoclassical style and completed in 1906.

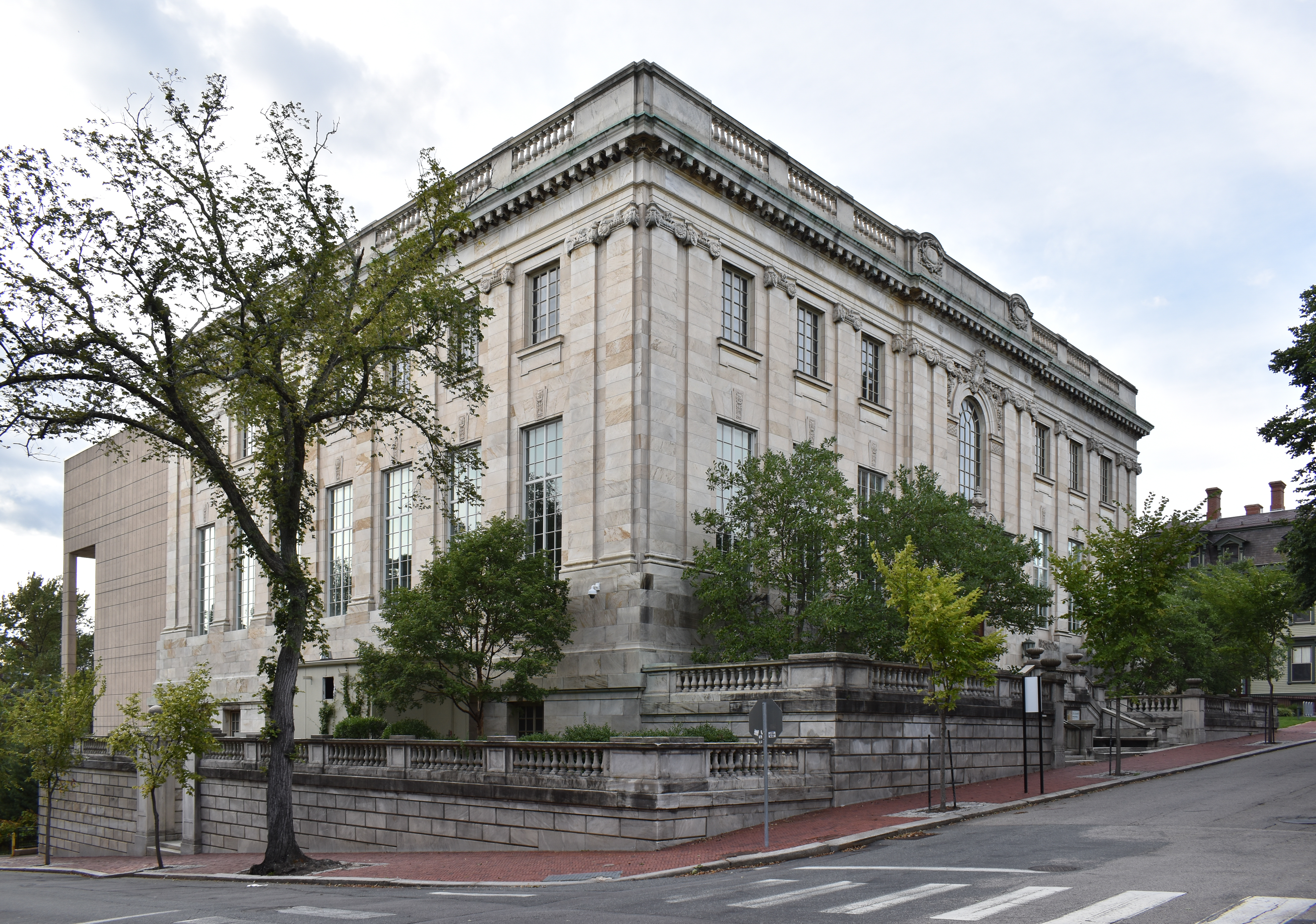
The John Hay Library of Brown University, designed by Shepley, Rutan & Coolidge in the Neoclassical style and completed in 1910.

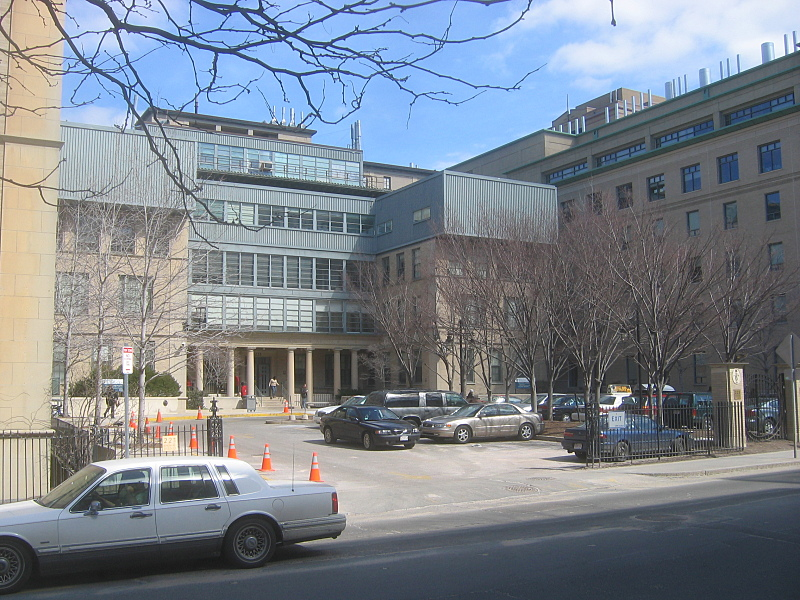
The former Boston Lying-In Hospital, designed by Coolidge & Shattuck in the Italian Renaissance Revival style and completed in 1922, was the winner of the inaugural Harleston Parker Medal in 1923.

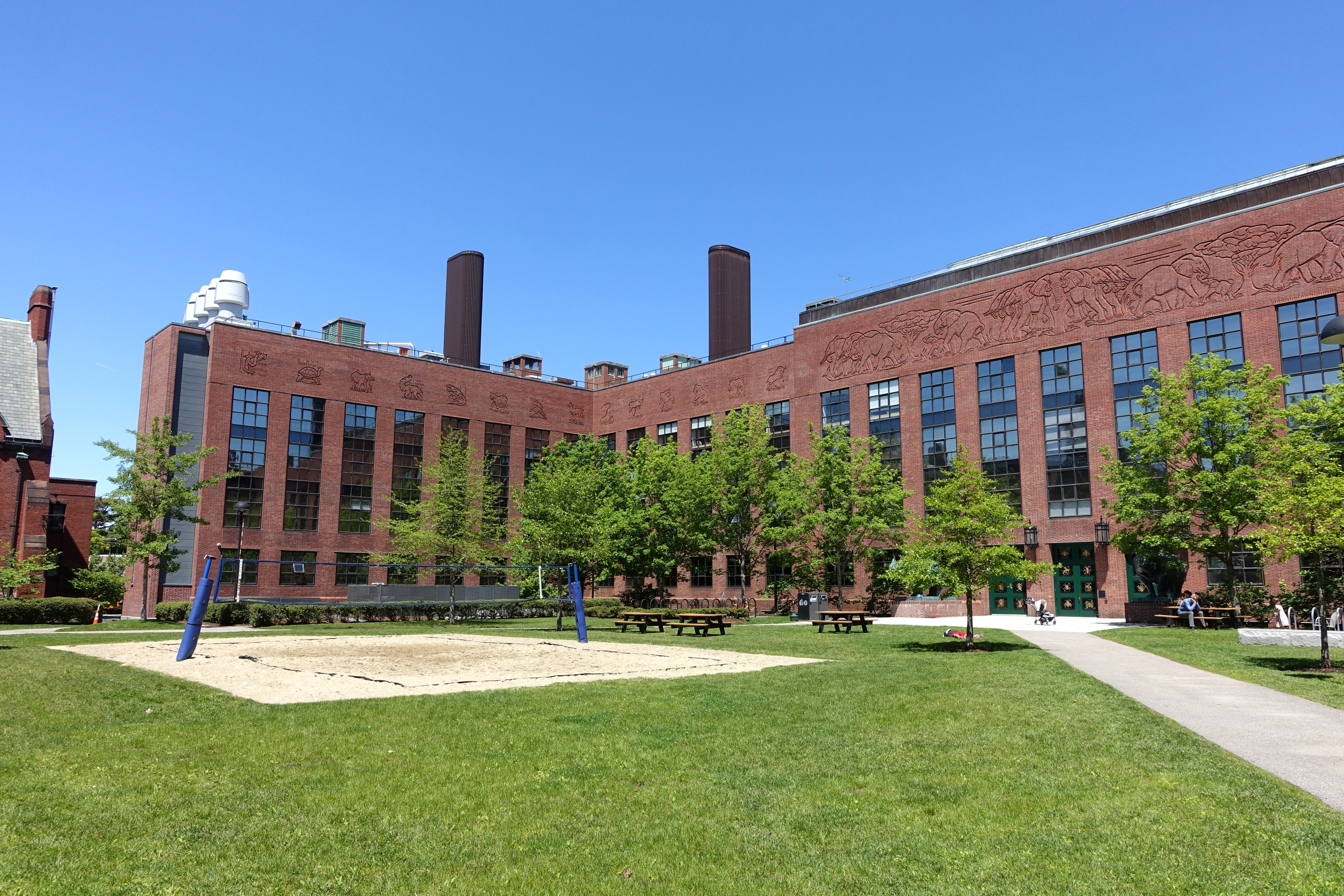
The Biological Laboratories of Harvard University, designed by Coolidge, Shepley, Bulfinch & Abbott in the Moderne style and completed in 1931.

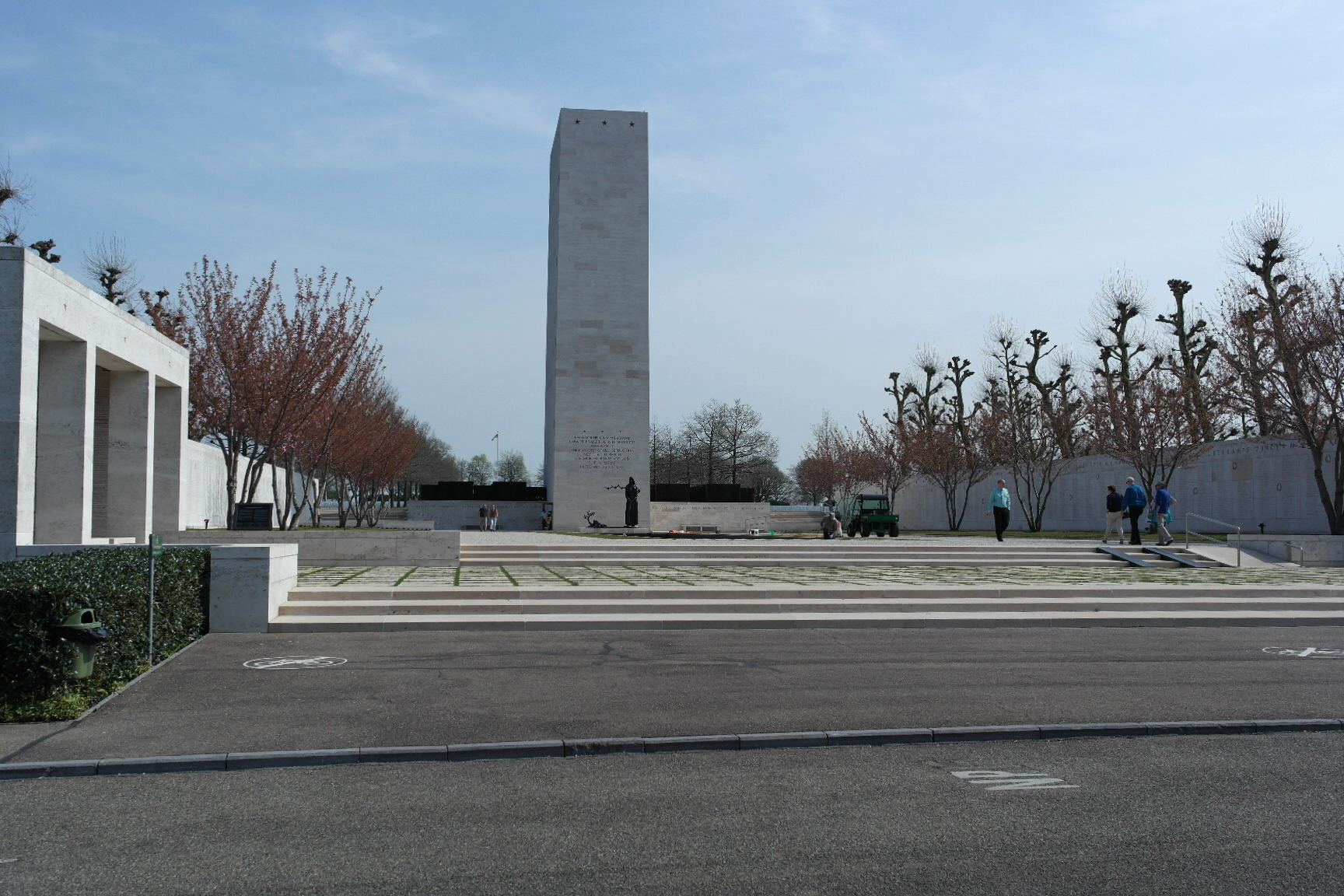
The Court of Honor of the Netherlands American Cemetery in Margraten, designed by Shepley, Bulfinch, Richardson & Abbott and dedicated in 1960.

The firm grew out of Henry Hobson Richardson's architectural practice. On the day of his death, Richardson left instructions that his practice should be continued by his three chief assistants: George Foster Shepley (November 7, 1860 – July 17, 1903), Charles Hercules Rutan (March 28, 1851 – December 17, 1914) and Charles Allerton Coolidge (November 30, 1858 – April 1, 1936), to whom in his declining health he had delegated greater and greater responsibility. Shepley was in charge of drafting, was Richardson's representative to clients and was engaged to Richardson's daughter, Julia Hayden. Rutan was the Richardson employee with the longest tenure and was the office's construction and engineering expert. Coolidge was Richardson's most favored designer. Before joining Richardson, both Shepley and Coolidge had worked for Ware & Van Brunt and had been educated at the Massachusetts Institute of Technology. Later, Coolidge married Shepley's sister, Julia.

Following Richardson's instructions, and with the legal and financial backing of his friends and clients Edward W. Hooper and Frederick Lothrop Ames, they organized the firm of Shepley, Rutan & Coolidge in June in Richardson's Brookline studio. At first they were primarily engaged on the completion of Richardson's many unfinished works, including the Allegheny County Courthouse in Pittsburgh and the John J. Glessner House in Chicago. By 1887 they had relocated from suburban Brookline to downtown Boston and were soliciting new work. The three partners quickly settled into their new roles: Shepley and Coolidge as designers and Rutan as superintendent and office manager. Coolidge also emerged as the firm's promoter and rainmaker and quickly began to win major projects for the firm.

By the time of Richardson's death, the Richardsonian Romanesque style with which he is associated had become widely imitated and was seen as old-fashioned by the most progressive American architects. Richardson himself was moving away from explicitly Romanesque detail, as at the New London Union Station (1887). Shepley and Coolidge initially continued as Richardsonian imitators. Later historians such as Henry-Russell Hitchcock have found their Richardsonian work to be of a higher quality than that of other imitators, though in their hands, without Richardson's imagination, it became stale and formulaic. Their Richardsonian works included the Ames Building (1889) in Boston, the Shadyside Presbyterian Church (1890) in Pittsburgh and the new campus of Stanford University (1891) near San Francisco.

After a few years Shepley and Coolidge embraced the Neoclassical and other contemporary revival styles, following the lead of McKim, Mead & White, who after Richardson's death had taken his position as the leading American architects. Their embrace of Neoclassicism first appeared in their unexecuted proposal for the Rhode Island State House (1891), a competition they lost to McKim. Their first built Neoclassical works included the Art Institute of Chicago (1893) and the Chicago Cultural Center (1897). During this time they also became known for their Colonial Revival work, especially that at Harvard University. Their first Harvard building was Conant Hall (1894) and would hold a near monopoly on design work at Harvard during the presidency of A. Lawrence Lowell. They were very successful in Chicago, where competing local architects began to jealously refer to them as "Simply Rotten & Foolish." In 1892 Coolidge consolidated all of the firm's field offices into a Chicago branch office, with himself as resident partner until 1900. If this move was in part an attempt to allay the Chicagoans' concern that they were architectural carpetbaggers, it was likely unsuccessful as additional important work, including the master plan and buildings of the University of Chicago, went into their office. In 1893 a second branch office was established in St. Louis, Shepley's hometown, under the management of John Lawrence Mauran. In 1900, as Coolidge returned to Boston, the firm chose to withdraw from St. Louis, and Mauran and two associates bought out the local business to form the firm of Mauran, Russell & Garden.

Shepley died in 1903 and Rutan became disabled in 1912, leaving Coolidge as the only active partner. Coolidge dissolved the partnership effective December 1, 1914, followed shortly by Rutan's death. By this time, Coolidge had found that the firm's two offices acted largely independently, and in 1915 he organized new partnerships to operate both: Coolidge & Shattuck with George C. Shattuck (November 22, 1863 – September 3, 1923) in Boston and Coolidge & Hodgdon with Charles Hodgdon (August 19, 1866 – November 21, 1953) in Chicago. Though they were both directed by Coolidge, the two firms operated independently of one another. In 1923, Shattuck died, and in 1924 Coolidge formed a new Boston partnership with Henry R. Shepley (May 1, 1887 – November 24, 1962), Francis V. Bulfinch (June 3, 1879 – September 14, 1963) and Lewis B. Abbott (June 27, 1878 – June 28, 1965), known as Coolidge, Shepley, Bulfinch & Abbott. Shepley was the son of his former partner and his own nephew, and Bulfinch was the great-grandson of Charles Bulfinch. In 1930, Coolidge retired from the Chicago partnership, which was thereafter known as Charles Hodgdon & Son.

Coolidge was active as the senior partner of the Boston firm until his death in 1936, leaving the younger Shepley as senior partner. The name of the firm was not changed until 1952, when, with the addition of Joseph P. Richardson (April 9, 1913 – September 14, 1979), it was renamed Shepley, Bulfinch, Richardson & Abbott. Richardson was, like Shepley, a grandson of H. H. Richardson. Other principals were added to the partnership over the next twenty years: in 1960 by James Ford Clapp Jr. (November 18, 1908 – January 22, 1998), son of the former partner of Clarence H. Blackall, in 1961 by Sherman Morss (February 22, 1912 – February 29, 1996), in 1963 by Jean Paul Carlhian (November 7, 1919 – October 18, 2012) and Hugh Shepley (March 17, 1928 – September 4, 2017), son of Henry R. Shepley, and in 1969 by Otis B. Robinson (April 25, 1916 – April 20, 1999).

In 1972 the firm was incorporated and the partnership was dissolved. For several years, control remained in the hands of Richardson as the head of the internal Executive Committee. Corporate officers, including president, were elected annually and had limited power. This system ended in 1978, when Richardson retired and George R. Mathey (June 4, 1929 – July 9, 2020) was elected the first long-term president. Mathey was a great-grandson of John J. Glessner, for whom H. H. Richardson had designed the John J. Glessner House. At this time the firm passed out of the control of the extended Richardson-Shepley-Coolidge family, which had led it since H. H. Richardson established himself independently in Brookline in 1878.

The firm was recipient of many design awards from the American Institute of Architects (AIA) and other bodies, including the AIA Architecture Firm Award in 1973. In 1961 Shepley was made an officer of the Order of Orange-Nassau by Juliana, Queen of the Netherlands, in recognition of his design for the Netherlands American Cemetery in Margraten. Over its long history the firm completed works in every major contemporary style. They made the difficult transition from traditionalism to modernism by melding Bauhaus functionalism with Beaux-Arts planning principles. This owed much to Carlhian, a French-born, Beaux-Arts-trained architect who had joined the firm in 1950. In 1999, historian Vincent Scully wrote that their work "[embodied] their own history of American architecture over more than a hundred years."

Since 2000 the firm has been known as Shepley Bulfinch. In 2009, Shepley Bulfinch acquired Merz Project, a small design studio located in Phoenix, Arizona, that is now the firm's Phoenix office. In 2015, the firm acquired Bailey Architects of Houston as its third office.

The firm today is one of the country's top architecture firms according to Architectural Record and Interior Design magazine, with a client base substantially drawn from healthcare, education, and civic institutions.

=== Employees ===
Richardson's studio was known as a training ground for young architects, many of whom would become notable in their own right. This continued under the leadership of Shepley and Coolidge. Their employees included:

- John Scudder Adkins
- David Robertson Brown
- Herbert C. Burdett
- James Edwin Ruthven Carpenter Jr.
- Robert T. Coles
- Frank Irving Cooper
- John Robert Dillon
- Edward T. P. Graham
- Alfred Hoyt Granger
- Henry Mather Greene
- Edwin Hawley Hewitt
- John Galen Howard
- Myron Hunt
- Paul V. Hyland
- Arthur S. Keene
- Samuel Abraham Marx
- Victor Andre Matteson
- John Lawrence Mauran
- Edward Maxwell
- Louis Christian Mullgardt
- Charles Nagel
- Joseph Ladd Neal
- Eliot Noyes
- William G. Perry
- Roy Place
- Ernest John Russell
- Frederick A. Russell
- Frank E. Rutan
- Francis Sargent
- Edward Durell Stone
- James Sweeney
- Hermann V. von Holst

== Notable projects ==
Image	Building	Location	Year	Notes	Ref
	Franklin MacVeagh Residence	Chicago, Illinois	1885–1887	Completed work started by Richardson. Razed in 1922.	
	Stanford University Main Quad	Stanford, California	1887–1906	Also designed Encina Hall and the Leland Stanford Residence.	
	Bell Telephone Building	St. Louis, Missouri	1889		
	Hartford Union Station	Hartford, Connecticut		Executed a design by George Keller	
	New London Public Library	New London, Connecticut	1889		
	Warder Public Library	Springfield, Ohio	1890		
	Shadyside Presbyterian Church	Shadyside, Pittsburgh, Pennsylvania	1890		
	Williams Memorial Institute	New London, Connecticut	1891		
	Chicago Public Library	Chicago, Illinois	1892	Now the Chicago Cultural Center	
	Flour and Grain Exchange Building	Boston, Massachusetts	1892		
	Lake Shore & Michigan Southern Station	Painesville, Ohio	1892		
	Lake Shore & Michigan Southern Station	Sandusky, Ohio	1892		
	Medfield State Hospital	Medfield, Massachusetts	1892		
	Montreal Board of Trade Building	Montreal, Quebec	1892	Destroyed in 1902.	
	Ames Building	Boston, Massachusetts	1893		
	Art Institute of Chicago			Built as the "World's Congress Auxiliary Building" for the World's Columbian Exposition.	
	North Union Station		1893	Razed in 1927.	
	Conant Hall	Cambridge, Massachusetts	1894	Built on the Harvard University campus	
	Trinity Church	Boston, Massachusetts	1894–1897	Completed work started by Richardson.	
	Tilden-Thurber Building	Providence, Rhode Island	1895		
	Coraopolis Station	Coraopolis, Pennsylvania	1896		
	Guardian Bank Building	Cleveland, Ohio	1896		
	Glassport P&LE Railroad Station	Glassport, Pennsylvania	c. 1896		
	Medill/McCormick Residence	Cantigny Park, Illinois	1896		
	New Castle Junction P&LE Railroad Station	New Castle, Pennsylvania	c. 1896	Destroyed	
	Third St. Joseph County Courthouse	South Bend, Indiana	1897		
	Congregational Library & Archives	Boston, Massachusetts	1898		
	South Station	Boston, Massachusetts	1898		
	Albany Union Station	Albany, New York	1899		
	Chestnut Hill Pump Station	Boston, Massachusetts	1900	Built for the Metropolitan Water Board.	
	Congregational Church of Ada	Ada, Minnesota	1900	Designed by Charles Dann Waterbury	
	Sedalia Public Library	Sedalia, Missouri	1900		
	Manufactures and Liberal Arts Building and Agriculture Building	Buffalo, New York	1901	For the Pan-American Exposition,	
	University of Chicago	Chicago, Illinois	1901–1915	Master plan and designs for more than fifteen buildings.	
	Bartlett Gymnasium	Chicago, Illinois	1904	Built for the University of Chicago.	
	John Carter Brown Library	Providence, Rhode Island	1904	Built for Brown University.	
	All Saints Episcopal Church	Appleton, Wisconsin	1905		
	Hildene	Manchester Center, Vermont	1905	Mansion built for Robert Todd Lincoln.	
	Harvard Medical School		1906		
	Langdell Hall		1907	Commissioned by James Barr Ames of the Harvard Law School.	
	Corn Exchange Bank Building	Chicago, Illinois	1908	Also known as National Republican Bank. Razed c. 1985.	
	Boston Safe Deposit Building	Boston, Massachusetts	1908–1911		
	Hampden County Courthouse	Springfield, Massachusetts	1908–1912	Additions to building designed by Richardson.	
	John Hay Library	Providence, Rhode Island	1910	Brown University library.	
	Union Station	Springfield, Massachusetts	1910		
	Harper Memorial Library	Chicago, Illinois	1910–1912	University of Chicago library.	
	YMCA Boston	Boston, Massachusetts	1911		
	First Congregational Church of Fall River	Fall River, Massachusetts	1912		
	Hunnewell Building	Boston	1914	Built for Boston Children's Hospital; Shepley, Bulfinch, Richardson and Abbott also worked on a 1987 addition.	
	Dallas Hall	University Park, Texas	1915	On the campus of Southern Methodist University.	
	Ida Noyes Hall	Chicago, Illinois	1916	Located on the University of Chicago campus.	
	Rockland Station	Rockland, Maine	1917	As Coolidge and Shattuck.	
	Freemason's Hall	Pittsburgh, Pennsylvania		Destroyed	
	Washington Building	Washington, D.C.	1927	Contributing property to the Financial Historic District	

=== Boston & Albany Railroad stations ===
Shepley, Rutan and Coolidge also designed 23 stations for the Boston & Albany Railroad (1886 through 1894):

- Newton Highlands station, Newton, Massachusetts (still standing)
- Union Station, Chatham, New York (still standing)
- Brighton station, Brighton, Massachusetts (still standing)
- Newton Lower Falls station, Wellesley, Massachusetts
- Ashland station, Ashland, Massachusetts (still standing)
- Reservoir station, Brookline, Massachusetts
- Dalton station, Dalton, Massachusetts (still standing)
- Springfield Union Station, Springfield, Massachusetts
- Wellesley Square station, Wellesley, Massachusetts
- Newton Centre station, Newton, Massachusetts (still standing)
- Huntington station, Huntington, Massachusetts
- Warren station, Warren, Massachusetts (still standing)
- Charlton station, Charlton, Massachusetts
- Brookline Hills station, Brookline, Massachusetts
- Hinsdale station, Hinsdale, Massachusetts
- Canaan station, Canaan, New York
- Millbury station, Millbury, Massachusetts
- Riverside station, Auburndale, Massachusetts
- Longwood station, Brookline, Massachusetts
- East Brookfield station, East Brookfield, Massachusetts
- Wellesley Farms station, Wellesley, Massachusetts (still standing)
- Saxonville station, Framingham, Massachusetts
- East Chatham station, Chatham, New York

=== Later work ===
The firm's later work includes the New York Hospital-Cornell Medical School (1934); the campus plan for Northeastern University (1936); the South Quadrangle museums of the Smithsonian (1986); Lafayette College's Farinon College Center (1991); Fordham University's William D. Walsh Library (1996); Smilow Cancer Hospital at Yale-New Haven (2010); and the Harvard Innovation Lab (2011).

The Main South Building (now Berthiaume Family South Building) for Children's Hospital Boston was profiled in the July 2007 issue of Healthcare Design Magazine, and was recipient of Modern Healthcare's 2006 Award of Excellence. Shepley Bulfinch was ranked third among the top architectural firms in the US in terms of the dollar value of new healthcare projects now underway, according to the September 2007 issue of Health Facilities Management. The firm also worked on Sherman Hospital, the largest geothermal hospital project under construction in the world at the time of its completion in 2009.

In 2014, Dartmouth-Hitchcock Medical Center, which was designed by the firm and opened in 1991, was one of two inaugural recipients of the Legacy Project Award by the American College of Healthcare Architects (ACHA) in recognition of the enduring and innovative quality of its original design. In its current work, the firm is designing the City of Austin's new public library, in a joint venture with Lake Flato of San Antonio.

== Sources ==
- online biography at University of Nebraska
- Lyndon, Donlyn. (1982) The City Observed: Boston, A Guide to the Architecture of the Hub. Vintage Books
- Pridmore, Jay, and Kiar, Peter, The University of Chicago: an architectural tour
- *Shepley Bulfinch at archINFORM
- Ochsner, Jeffrey Karl Ochsner, H.H. Richardson, Complete Architectural Works
- photos of 1890 Bell Telephone Building, St. Louis
