= Guardian Bank Building =

- New England Building
- U.S. National Register of Historic Places
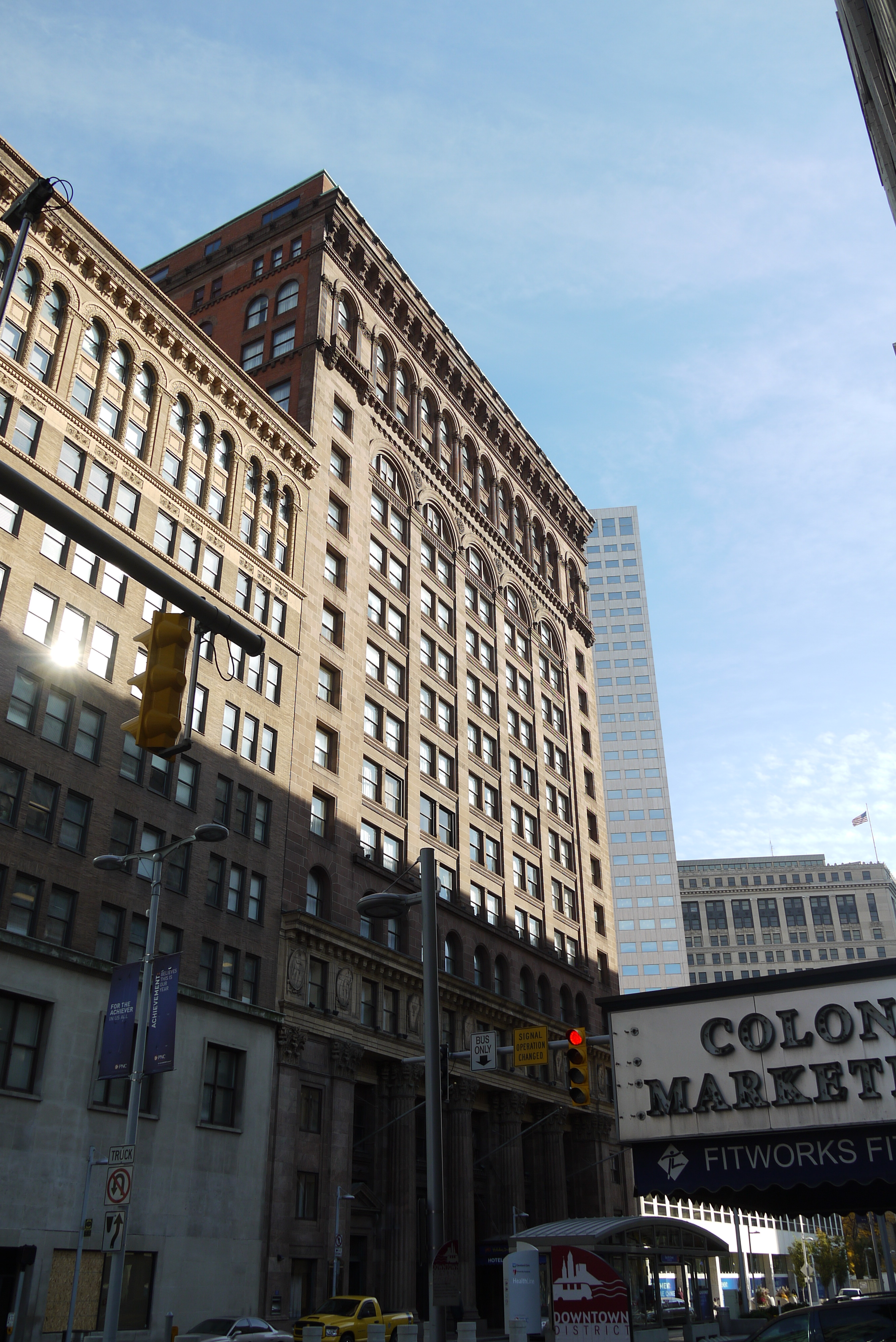

- Location within Cleveland Location within Ohio Location within the United States
- Location: 617–637 Euclid Ave., 614–626 Vincent Ave., Cleveland, Ohio
- Coordinates: 41°30′1″N 81°41′20″W
- Area: 1 acre (0.40 ha)
- Built: 1895
- Architect: Shepley, Rutan & Coolidge; Walker & Weeks
- Architectural style: Beaux Arts
- NRHP reference No.: 00001065
- Added to NRHP: September 8, 2000

The Guardian Bank Building (originally known as the New England Building and later known as the National City Bank Building) is a high–rise building on Euclid Avenue in downtown Cleveland, Ohio.

== Description and history ==
It was built in 1896 and stands adjacent to National City Center (now PNC Center). At 221 feet (67 m) tall, it was once one of the tallest buildings in America and tallest in Cleveland until 1922 when it was surpassed by the Keith Building. The building was designed by the firm of Shepley, Rutan, and Coolidge and remodeled by Walker and Weeks in 1915. It was converted to a Holiday Inn Express in 1999, and added to the National Register of Historic Places on September 8, 2000.

In January 2010, Rosetta, the largest independent interactive agency in America, announced plans to move into the Guardian Bank Building. The plans, announced in conjunction with the signing of a 10–year lease, include stripping and remodeling the top five floors, building a new penthouse suite on the roof, and renaming the building. In March 2012, developers announced plans to convert five stories into 85 apartments.

== See also ==
- List of Registered Historic Places in Cleveland, Ohio
- List of tallest buildings in Cleveland
