= Ames Building =

Building in Boston, Massachusetts

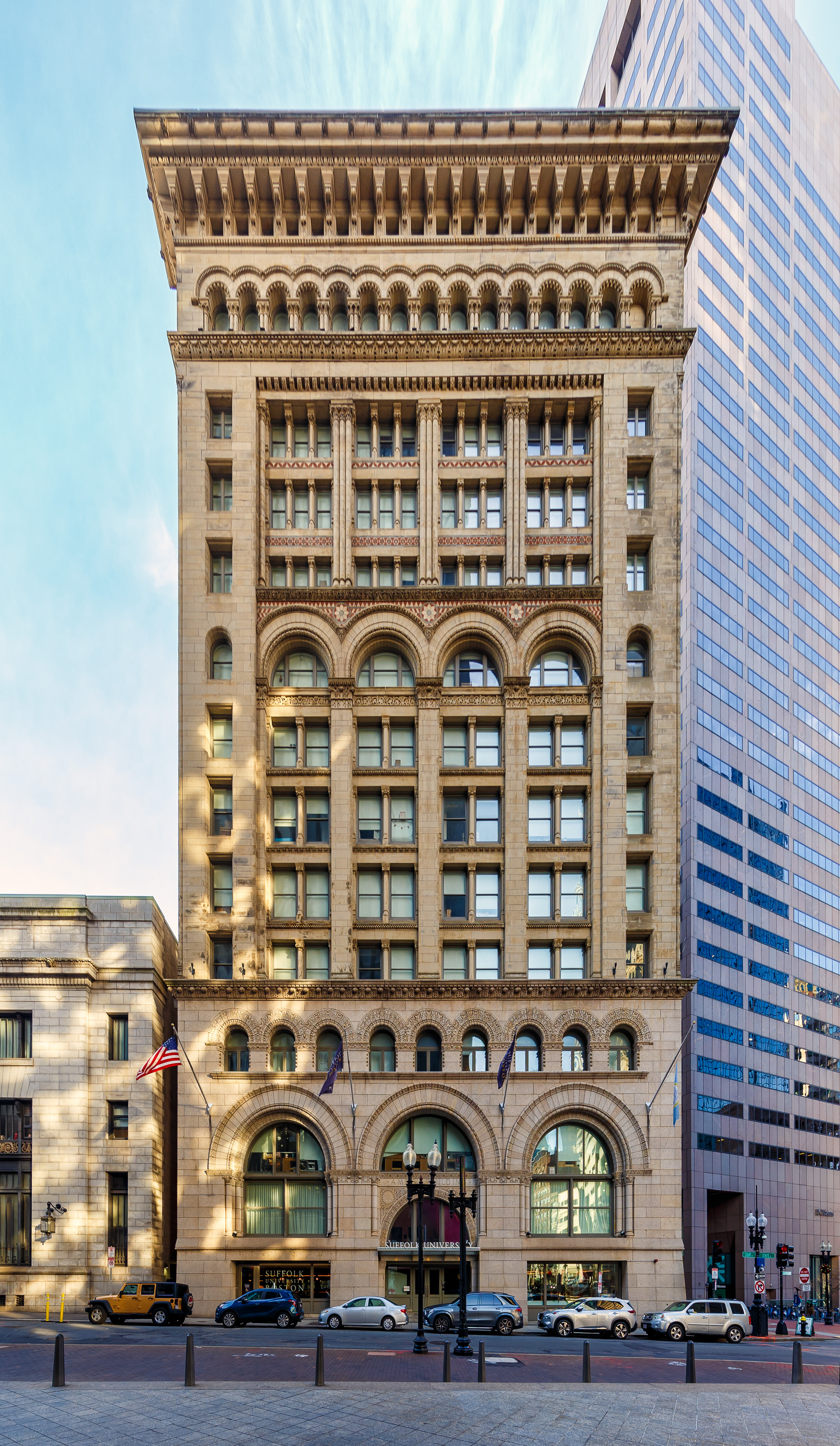
- 2024
- Interactive map of the Ames Building area

General information
- Type: Office (1889–1999); Hotel (2007–2019); College Dormitory (2020-Present)
- Location: 1 Court Street; Boston, Massachusetts
- Coordinates: 42.35890°N 71.05786°W
- Completed: 1889

Technical details
- Floor count: 14

Design and construction
- Architect: Shepley, Rutan, and Coolidge
- Developer: Cleveland Quarries
- Ames Building
- U.S. National Register of Historic Places
- Area: 0.1 acres (0.040 ha)
- NRHP reference No.: 74000382
- Added to NRHP: April 26, 1974

The Ames Building is located in Boston, Massachusetts. It is sometimes ranked as the tallest building in Boston from its completion in 1889 until 1915, when the Custom House Tower was built, but the steeple of the 1867 Church of the Covenant was much taller than the Ames Building. It is nevertheless considered Boston's first skyscraper. In 2007, the building was converted from office space to a luxury hotel. In 2020, the building was purchased by Suffolk University and converted into a student residence hall.

== History ==
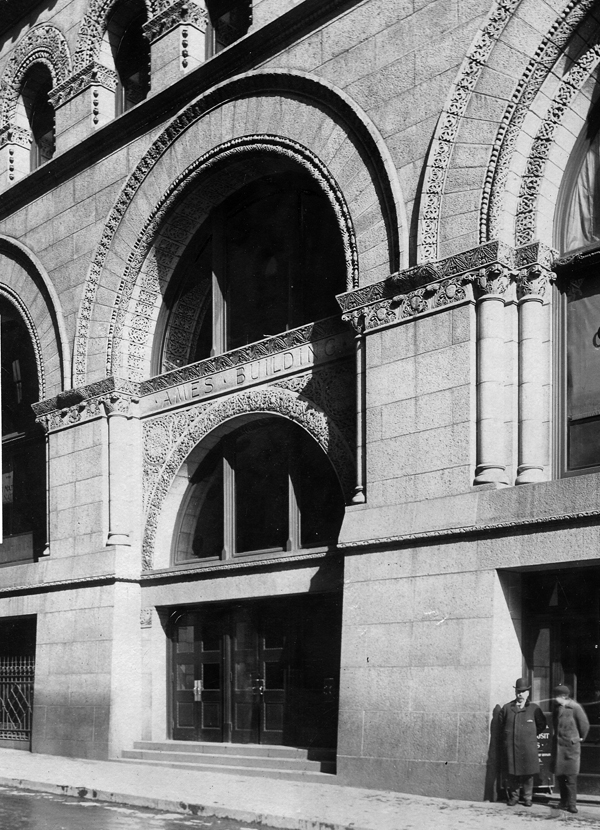
Entrance of Ames Building c.1894

Located at 1 Court Street and Washington Mall in downtown Boston, the Ames Building was designed by the architectural firm of Shepley, Rutan and Coolidge in Richardsonian Romanesque and paid for by Frederick L. Ames. It is the second tallest masonry load bearing-wall structure in the world, exceeded only by the Monadnock Building in Chicago, completed that same year. It is fourteen stories faced in granite and sandstone and includes a four story base with large arches framing the second and third floor windows resting on Romanesque columns. Upper stories feature smaller arches. The sandstone is from the Berea formation in Ohio and was supplied by Cleveland Quarries Company. Construction completed in 1889, but interior work was not completed for occupancy until 1893. It became the corporate headquarters for the Ames families' agricultural tool company.

The Ames Building was added to the National Register of Historic Places on May 26, 1974 and later designated as a Boston Landmark by the Boston Landmarks Commission in 1993.

=== Renovations ===
After being unoccupied for eight years, Eamon O’Marah, Rich Kilstock and Seth Greenberg (Ames Hotel Partners, LLC) and Normandy Real Estate Partners for $17.7 million purchased the structure in April 2007. Tishman Construction Corporation of New York completed renovations to the building based on a design by Cambridge Seven Associates and with oversight provided by Walsh Co. LLC of Morristown, New Jersey.

=== Hotel ===
From 2009 to 2019, the Ames Building was a luxury boutique hotel under the name of The Ames Boston Hotel. In 2019, the hotel closed and nearby Suffolk University purchased it for use as a dormitory, known as "One Court Street", which opened in the fall of 2020.

== See also ==
- National Register of Historic Places listings in northern Boston, Massachusetts
