= Boston Society of Architects =

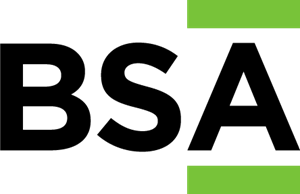
- Abbreviation: BSA
- Formation: 1867
- Type: NGO
- Purpose: Architectural profession
- Headquarters: Boston
- Region served: Massachusetts
- Members: 5,000+
- Website: architects.org

The Boston Society for Architecture (formerly known as the Boston Society of Architects) (BSA) is a nonprofit membership organization committed to architecture, design and the built environment.

== History ==
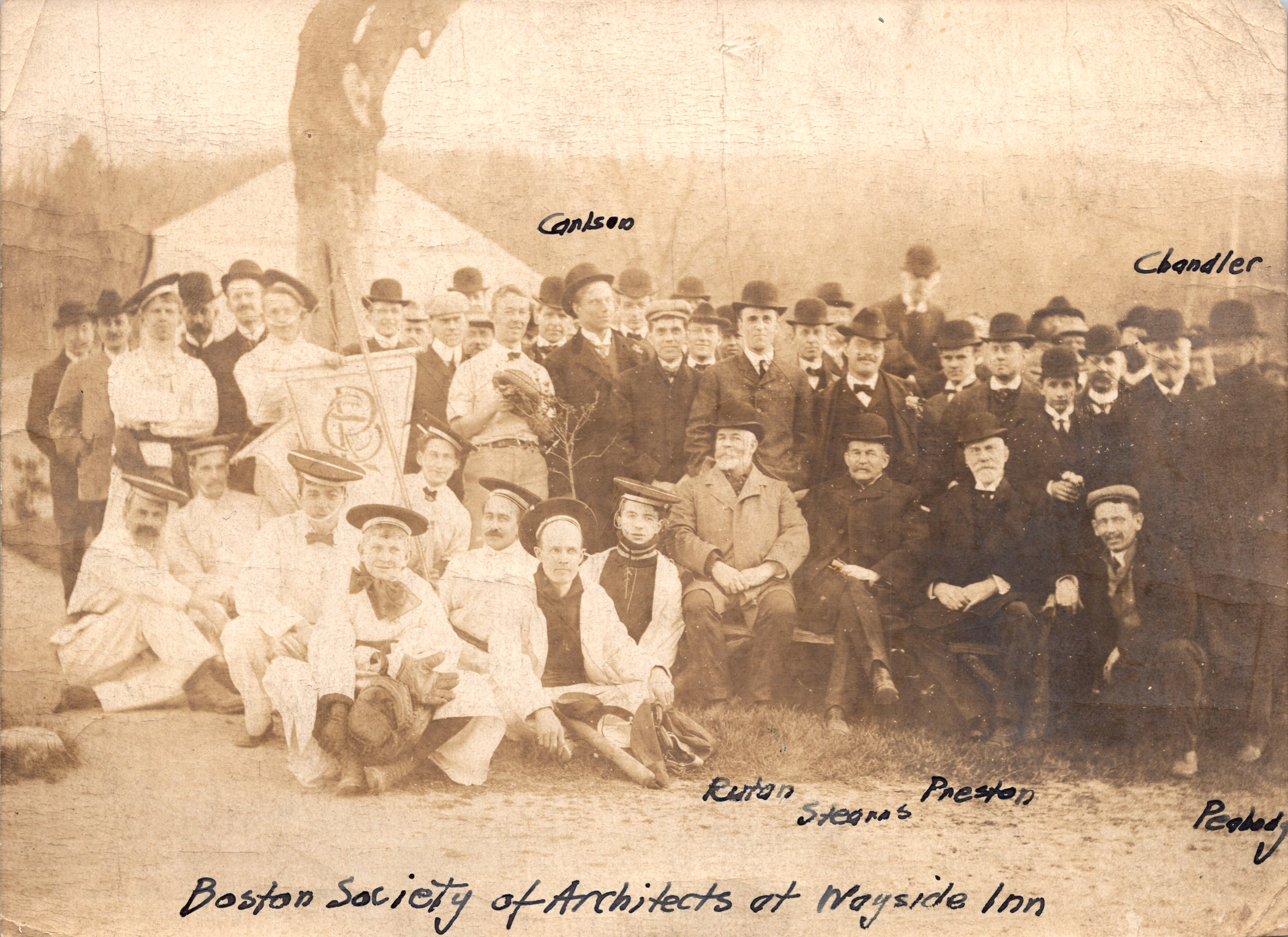
Boston Society of Architects meeting at Wayside Inn circa 1908. Architects Pictured: Charles Hercules Rutan, John Goddard Stearns, William Gibbons Preston, Joseph Everett Chandler, and Robert Swain Peabody.

On June 20, 1867, approximately 50 architects convened in the City of Boston to sign the articles of association for the Boston Society of Architects. Since this time, the BSA has grown to approximately 4,000 members, making it one of the largest branches of the AIA.

The BSA became the eastern Massachusetts regional association of the AIA in 1870. It has sister chapters in Central Massachusetts and Western Massachusetts. These three chapters constitute AIA Massachusetts.

The membership of the BSA supports ArchitectureBoston Magazine, an ideas-focused publication edited by Boston Globe columnist Renée Loth; and BSA Space, a gallery for public architecture and design-related exhibitions. They convene annually at the Architecture Boston Expo convention.

The BSA is headquartered in BSA Space at 290 Congress Street, Suite 200, Boston MA 02210.

== Organization ==
=== Membership ===
The 4,000 members of the BSA include approximately 2,000 registered architects, 500 professionals on the path to become licensed architects, and other designers, architectural industry professionals, corporate affiliate members and the public. Of note is the BSA's historic role in cultivating an inclusive membership structure within the AIA.

=== Structure ===
The BSA is governed by a 23-person elected board of directors, including a president, representatives from local architectural colleges and representatives of the 40-plus committees, and maintains a staff of 20 full-time employees.

=== Programs and awards ===
The BSA promotes and enhances the practice of architecture and design through such programs as building-industry conventions Build Boston and Residential Design and Construction, skills training, design lectures, job and college fairs, ARE study groups, Common Boston Week and more.

ArchitectureBoston is the BSA's ideas magazine.

=== BSA Space ===
Opened in 2011, BSA Space is Boston's leading cultural institution on architecture and design. BSA Space hosts exhibitions on design and architecture, architecture cruises and walking tours, and other programs and events that foster exchange between design and construction, the profession and the public, and encourage collaboration across the city and world.

Nestled on Boston's waterfront between the Fort Point Channel and the Rose Fitzgerald Kennedy Greenway, BSA Space opened in the Atlantic Wharf building in December 2011. Boston-based firm Höweler+Yoon designed the floorplan, using a concept that centers on a highly visible “cloud” ceiling and monumental stairs. These two architectural elements act as iconic markers for BSA Space and an invitation into the exhibits and meeting spaces above. The design was chosen during a 2010 design competition overseen by the BSA board of directors. Commodore Builders provided construction management services in what was a highly collaborative project.

== See also ==
- Harleston Parker Medal
- William D. Austin, former president of the group who wrote a book on its history
- Society of American Registered Architects
