= Dudley St. Clair Donnelly =

American architect

- Born: September 17, 1870; Barbados
- Died: March 5, 1937 (aged 66); New London, Connecticut
- Occupation: Architect

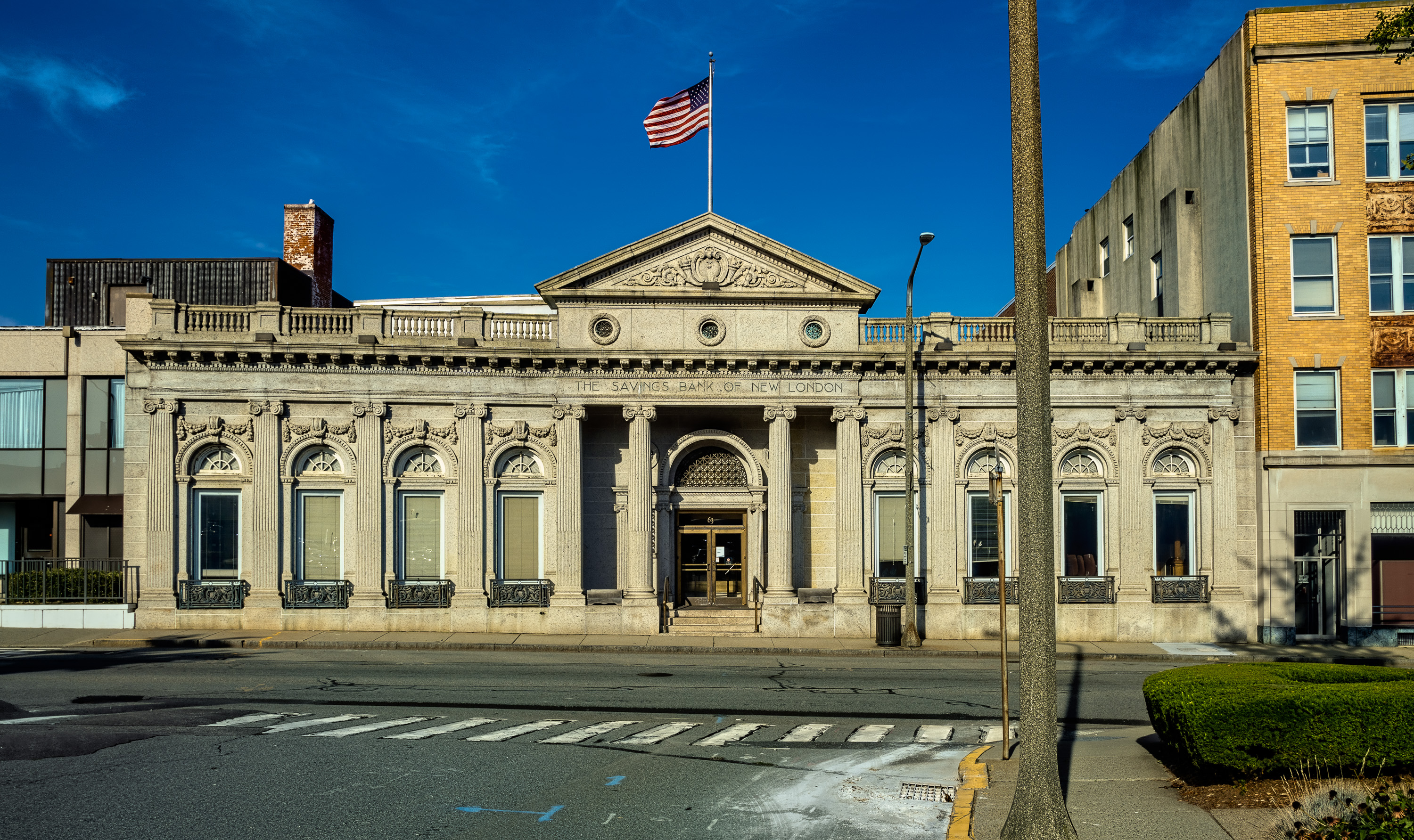
The Savings Bank of New London Building in New London, Connecticut, designed by Donnelly in 1903 and completed in 1905.

Dudley St. Clair Donnelly (1870–1937) was an American architect practicing in New London, Connecticut in the late nineteenth and early twentieth centuries.

== Life and career ==
Dudley St. Clair Donnelly was born September 17, 1870, in Barbados to Henry C. Donnelly and Catherine (Barry) Donnelly. In 1875 the family moved to Yonkers, New York, where Donnelly was educated, graduating from high school in 1888. He received his architectural training in the offices of Benjamin Silliman in New York City and Arthur F. Gray in Boston. In 1892 he was employed by Cole & Chandler, architects of New London and Boston. Cole died in New London in 1893, and Chandler consolidated his practice in Boston. Donnelly then opened his own office in New London. He worked alone until 1899 when he formed a partnership with Louis R. Hazeltine. The partnership of Donnelly & Hazeltine was dissolved in December, 1906, after which Donnelly returned to private practice.

After fifteen more years in New London, in 1919 Donnelly began to live and work in Florida for part of the year. He moved full-time to Coral Gables in 1925. During the land boom many northern architects moved to Florida. The local economy collapsed following the hurricanes of 1926 and 1928, and with the start of the Great Depression Donnelly returned to New London in 1930. He then served as city building inspector, and supervised the construction of WPA projects.

== Personal life ==
Donnelly married Joanna E. Hurley of New London, and they had two sons. He served on the city council.

Donnelly was a member of the American Institute of Architects from 1921 to 1929.

Donnelly died March 5, 1937, in New London.

== Legacy ==
Like many of his contemporaries, Donnelly was an eclectic designer and drew on different historical styles for each project. He was especially fond of the Renaissance Revival style, which he used extensively in his commercial and institutional projects. Other buildings utilized the Colonial Revival or the Gothic Revival styles, while some residential projects were inspired by the Arts and Crafts movement and the American Craftsman style. One of his major clients was Morton Freeman Plant, who commissioned him to design an office building in New London, his hunting lodge in East Lyme, a garage on his Groton estate and golf clubs in Groton and Belleair, Florida.

At least four buildings designed by Donnelly have been listed on the United States National Register of Historic Places, though one has been demolished. Others contribute to listed historic districts.

== Architectural works ==
- House for Dudley St. Clair Donnelly, (Note: Donnelly's own house at 308 Ocean Avenue. In 1904 he built a new house at 58 Bellevue Place. This was sold to Edward Angle in 1909 when Donnelly moved a second time. The two earlier houses are contributing properties to the Montauk Avenue Historic District, listed on the National Register of Historic Places in 1990.) New London, Connecticut (1897)
- House for Col. Augustus C. Tyler, New London, Connecticut (1897, demolished)
- Groton Congregational Church, Groton, Connecticut (1902)
- Saltonstall School (former), New London, Connecticut (1902–03)
- Savings Bank of New London Building, (Note: A contributing property to the Downtown New London Historic District, listed on the National Register of Historic Places in 1979 and expanded in 1988.) New London, Connecticut (1903–05)
- House for Leander K. Shipman, (Note: A contributing property to the Williams Memorial Park Historic District, listed on the National Register of Historic Places in 1987.) New London, Connecticut (1904)
- Expansion of the Crocker House, New London, Connecticut (1905)
- New London Manual Training and Industrial School (former), New London, Connecticut (1905–06, demolished)
- Mariners Savings Bank Building, New London, Connecticut (1906, demolished)
- Day Building, New London, Connecticut (1907)
- Hunting lodge for Morton Freeman Plant, East Lyme, Connecticut (1908, NRHP 1988)
- Expansion of the New London County Courthouse, (Note: Originally built in 1784 probably to a design by Isaac Fitch. Donnelly's alterations included a large rear addition and remodeling of the interior.) New London, Connecticut (1909, NRHP 1970)
- Garage at "Branford Farm" for Morton Freeman Plant, Groton, Connecticut (1910, NRHP 1984, demolished)
- Groton Heights School, Groton, Connecticut (1912)
- Manwaring Building, New London, Connecticut (1913)
- Natchaug School, Willimantic, Connecticut (1913)
- Clubhouse, Shennecossett Country Club, Groton, Connecticut (1914)
- Plant Building, New London, Connecticut (1914)
- Y. M. C. A. Building (former), (Note: Designed in association with Louis E. Jallade of New York.) New London, Connecticut (1915)
- March Building, New London, Connecticut (1916)
- Winthrop House, Connecticut College, New London, Connecticut (1916)
- Clubhouse, Belleview Country Club, Belleair, Florida (1919, demolished)
- Ohev Sholem Synagogue (former), New London, Connecticut (1919, NRHP 1995)
- Receiving Building, Connecticut State Farm and Reformatory for Women (former), Niantic, Connecticut (1920)
- Governor Waller School (former), (Note: A contributing property to the Montauk Avenue Historic District, listed on the National Register of Historic Places in 1990.) New London, Connecticut (1923)
- House for Greta Hughes, (Note: Built for an aunt of Harold Hughes.) Coral Gables, Florida (1926)

== Gallery of architectural works ==
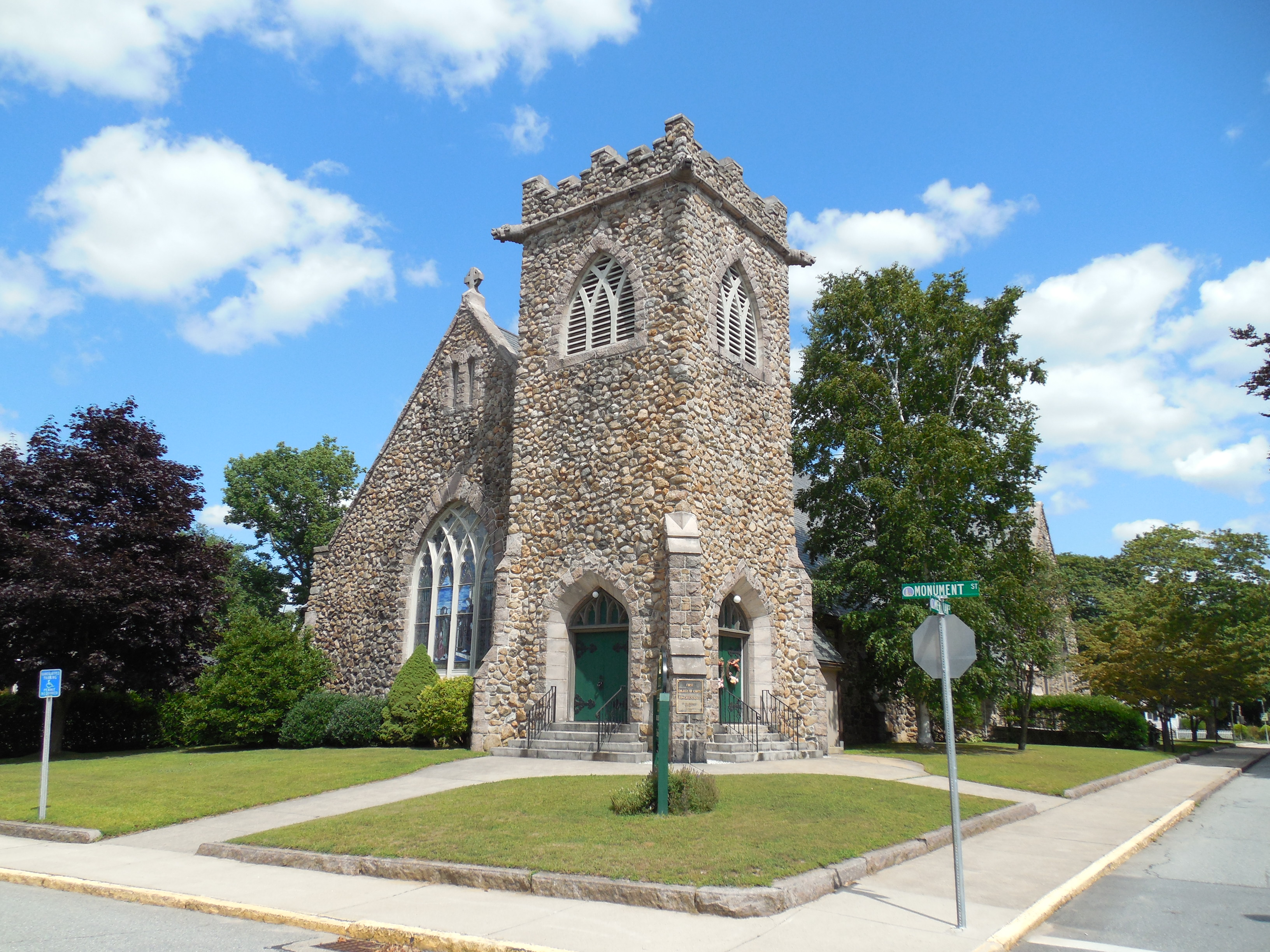
Groton Congregational Church, Groton, Connecticut, 1902.

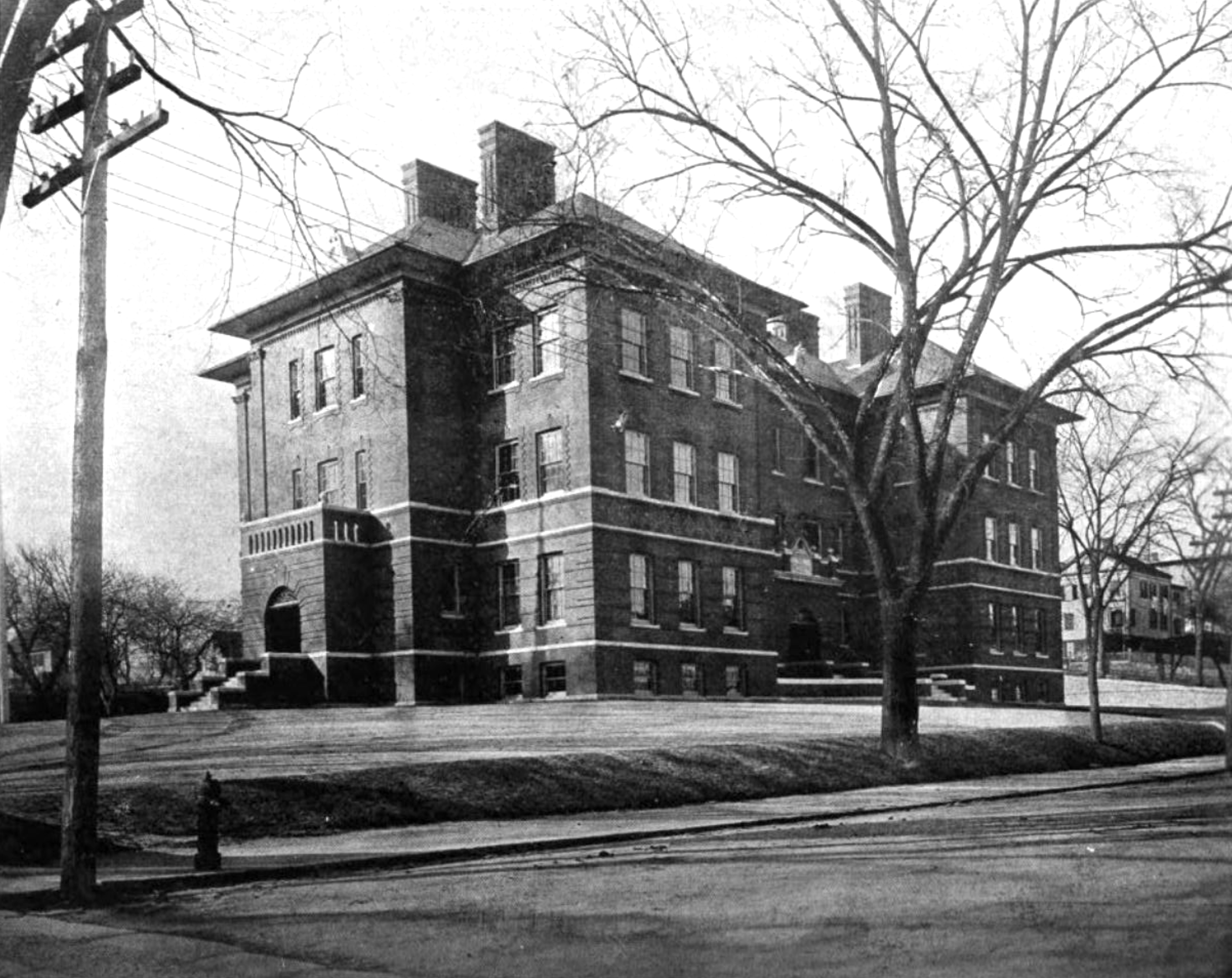
Saltonstall School (former), New London, Connecticut, 1902-03.

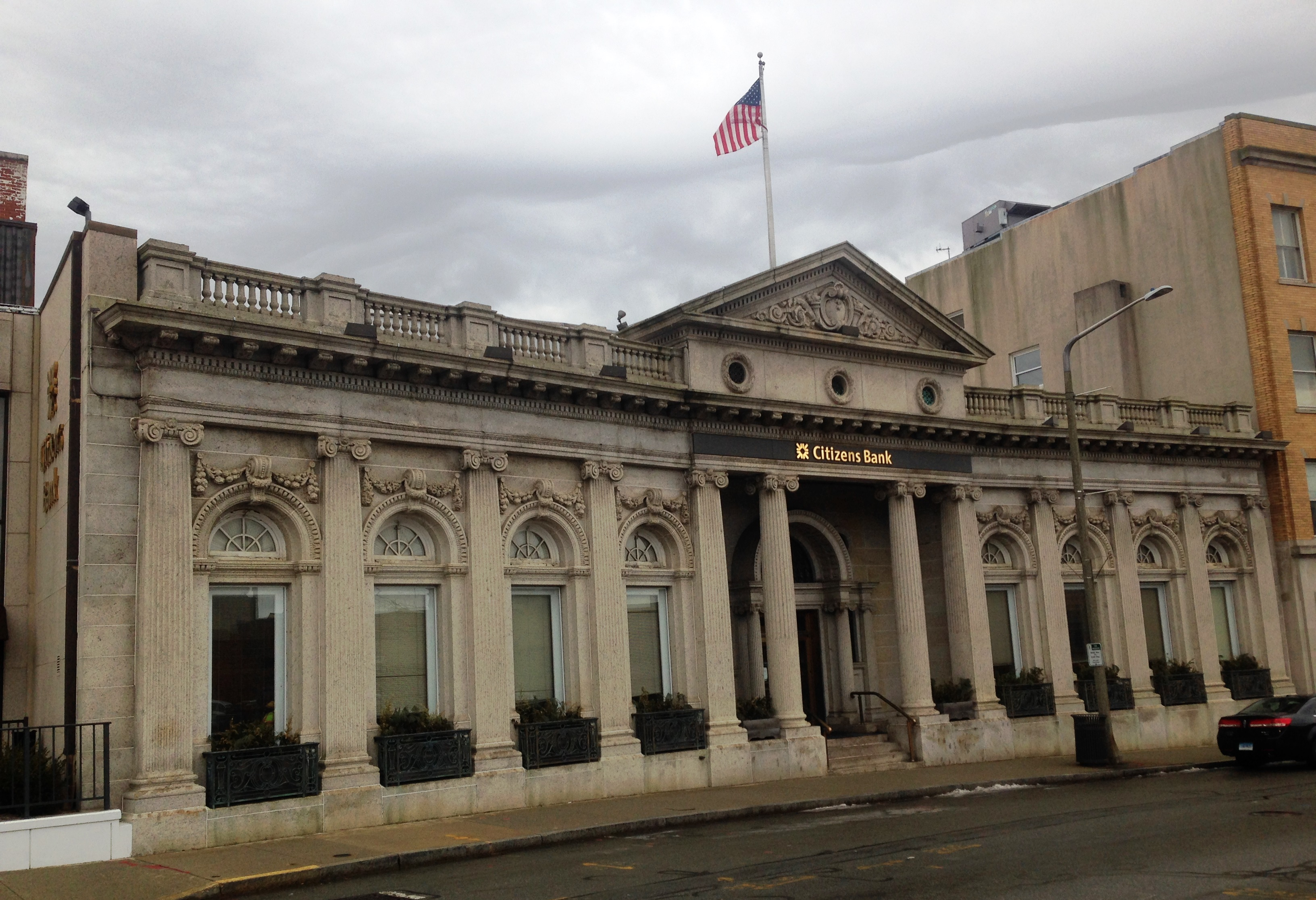
Savings Bank of New London Building, New London, Connecticut, 1903-05.

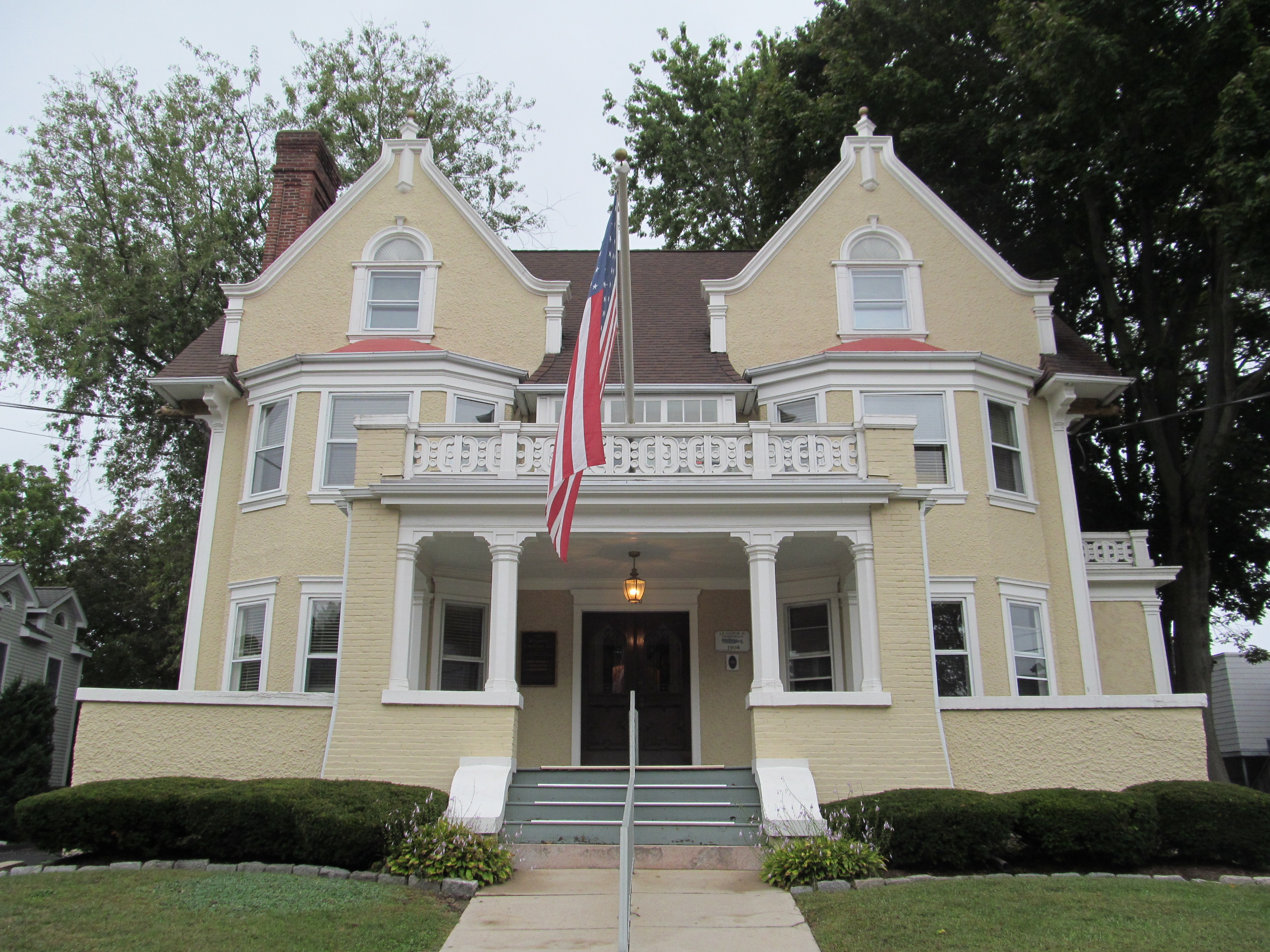
House for Leander K. Shipman, New London, Connecticut, 1904.

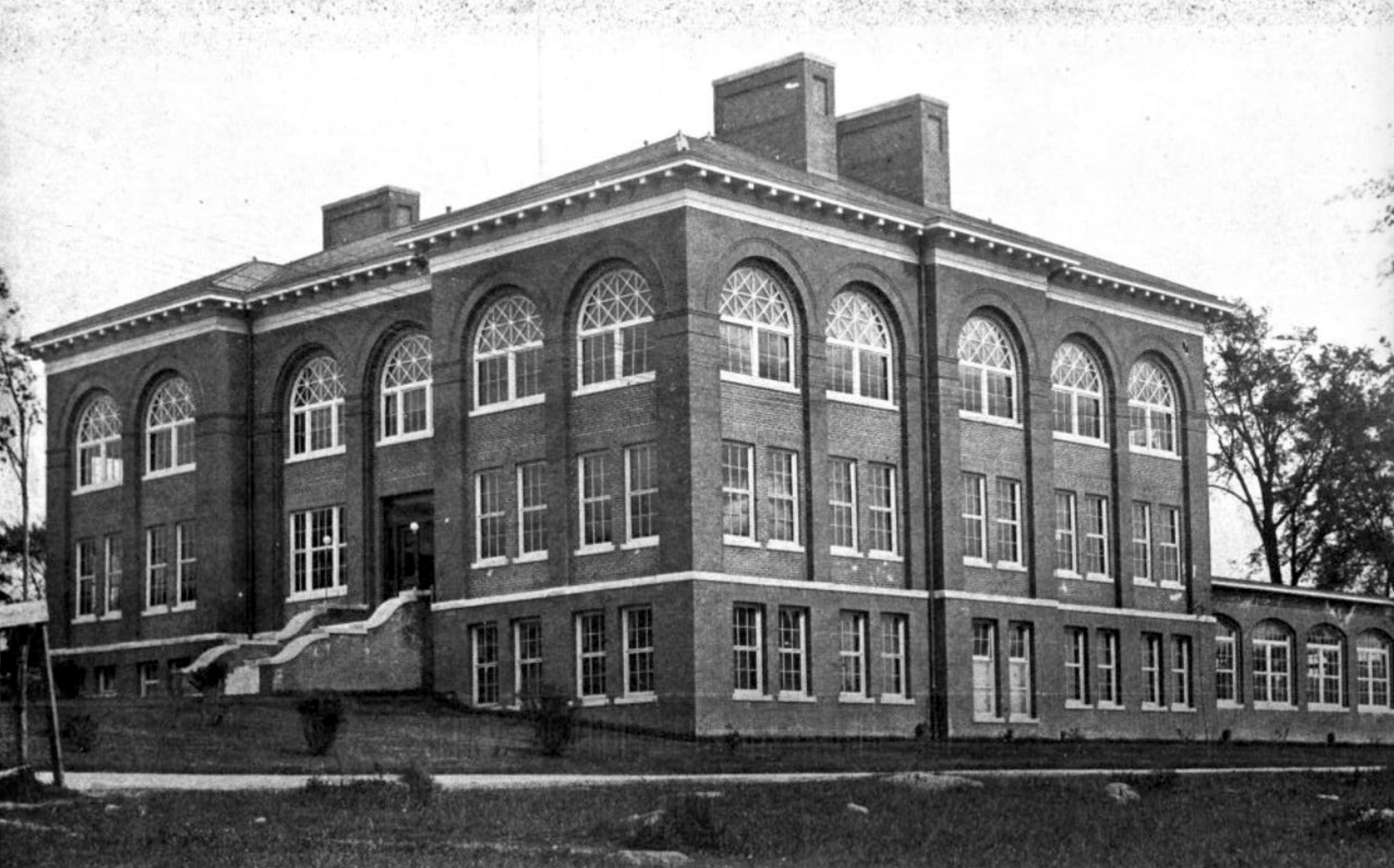
New London Manual Training and Industrial School, New London, Connecticut, 1905-06.

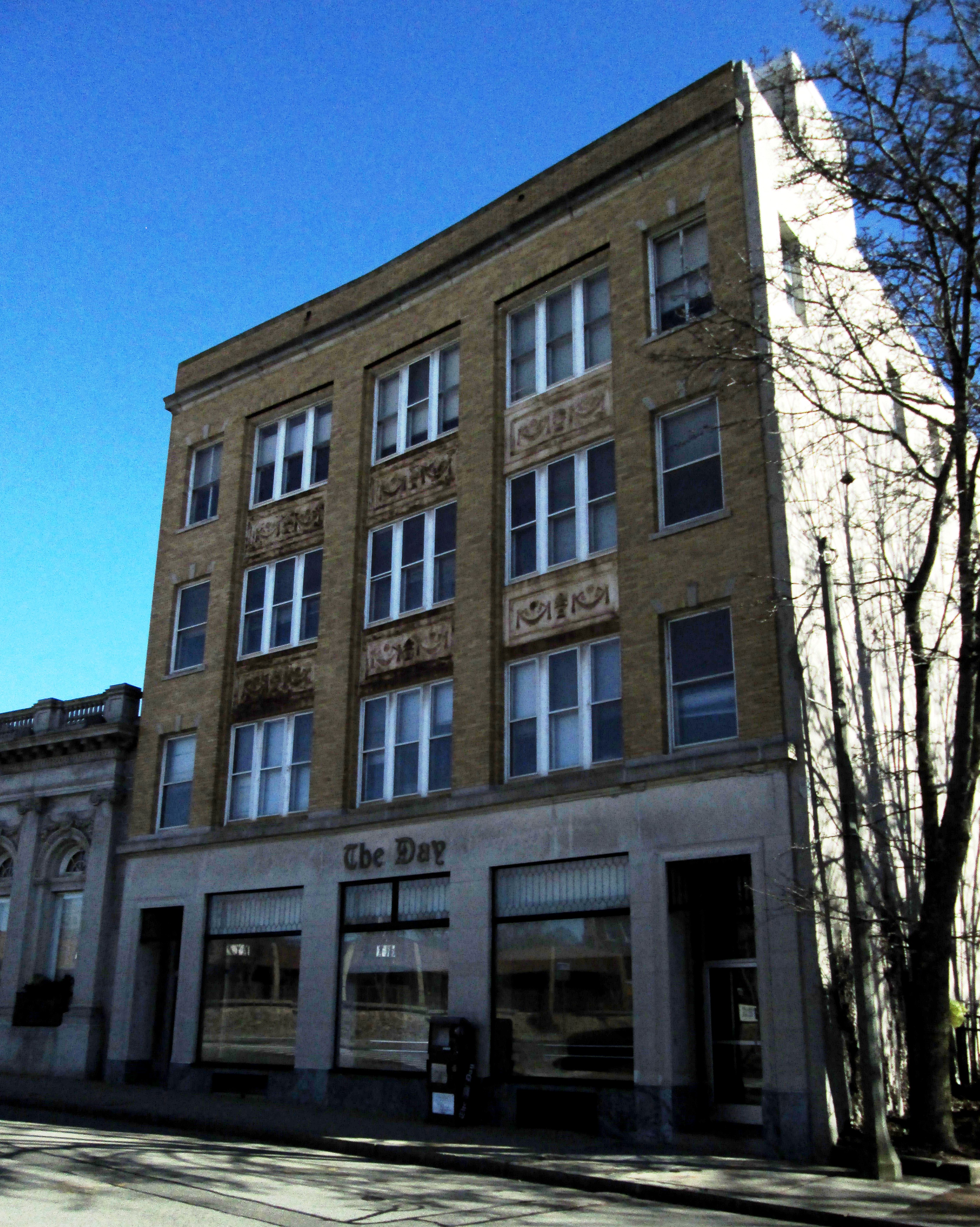
Day Building, New London, Connecticut, 1907.

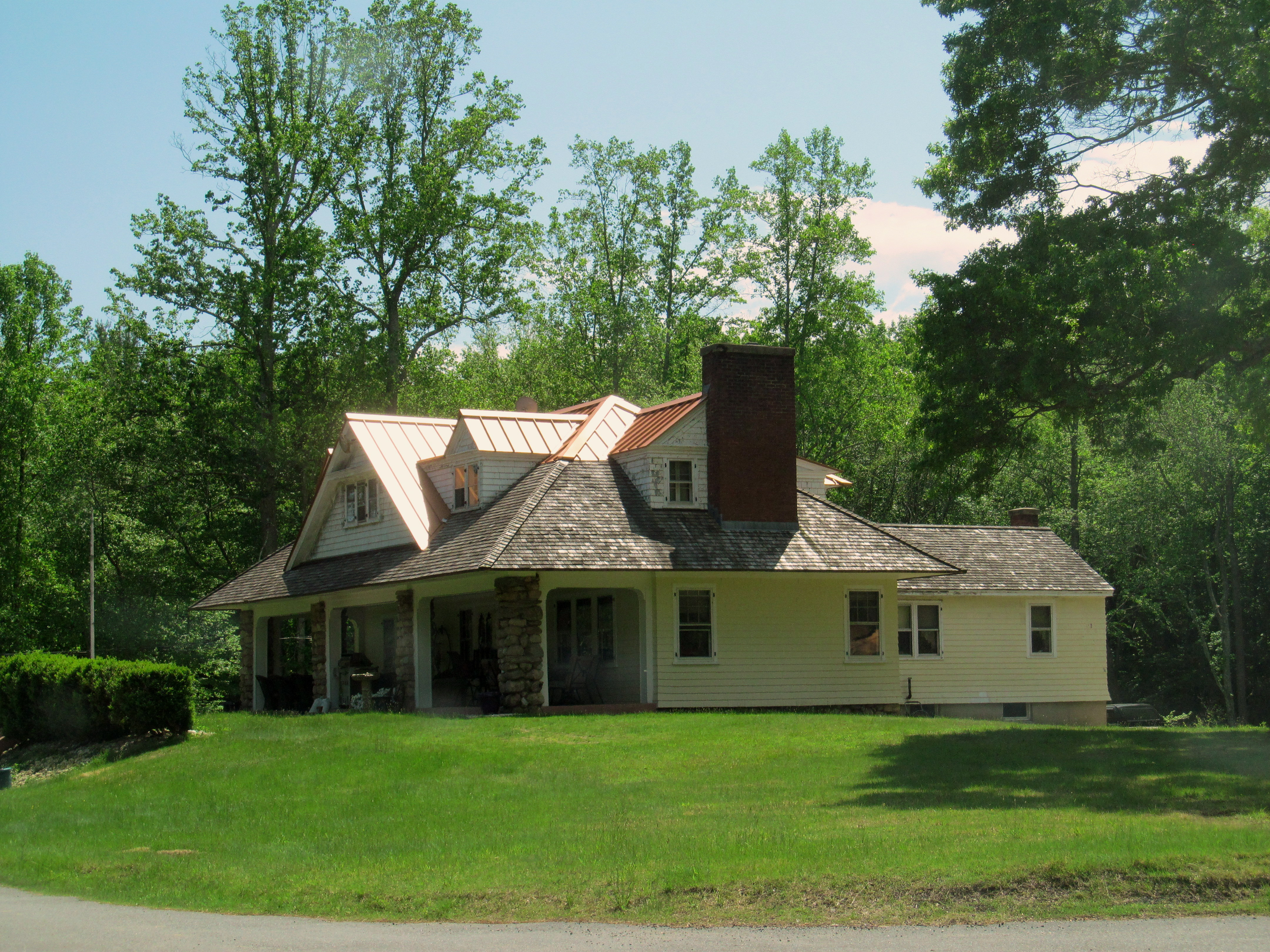
Hunting lodge for Morton F. Plant, East Lyme, Connecticut, 1908.

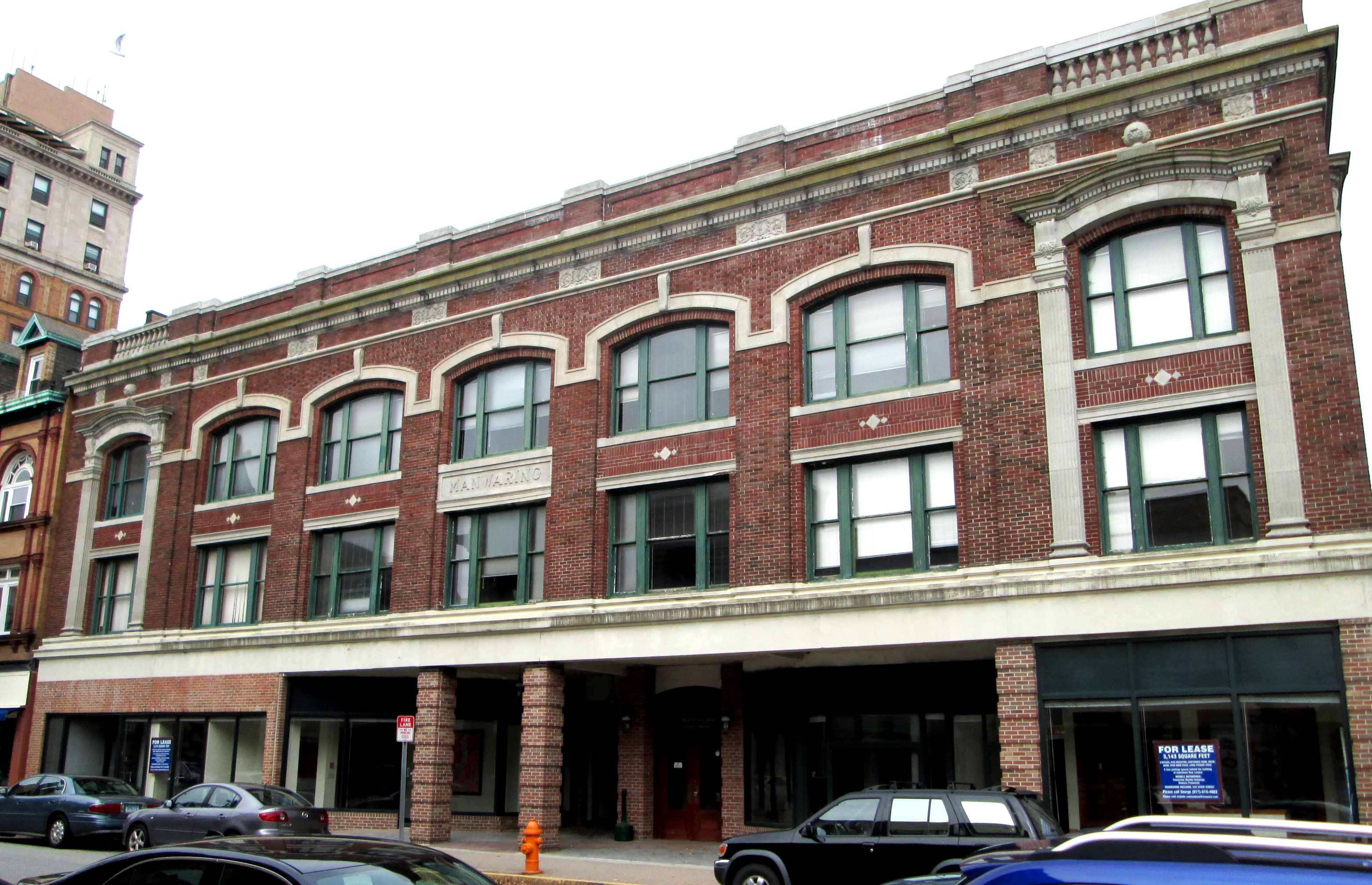
Manwaring Building, New London, Connecticut, 1913.

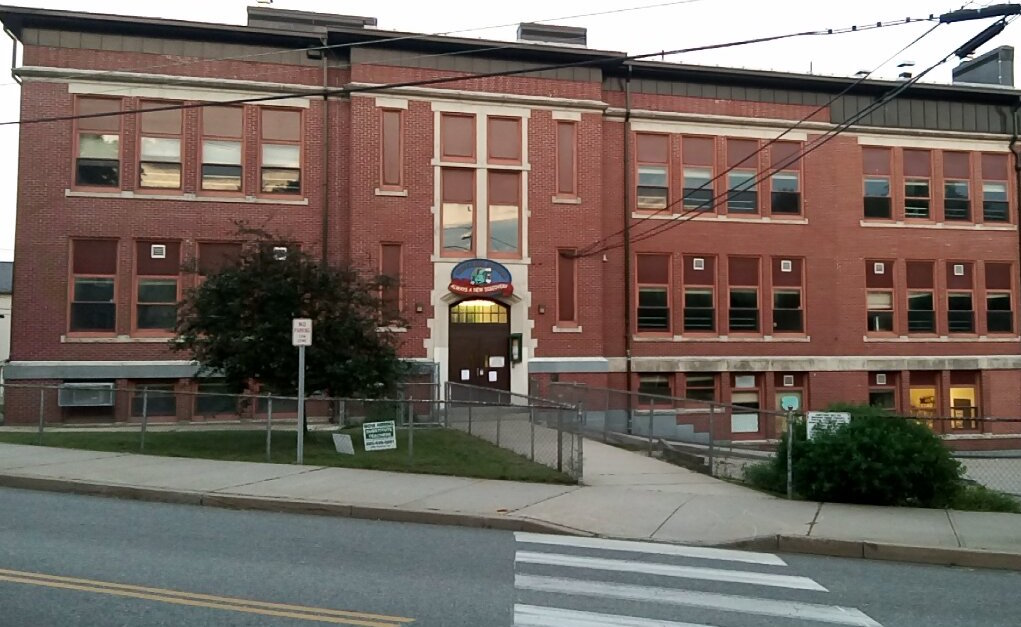
Natchaug School, Willimantic, Connecticut, 1913.

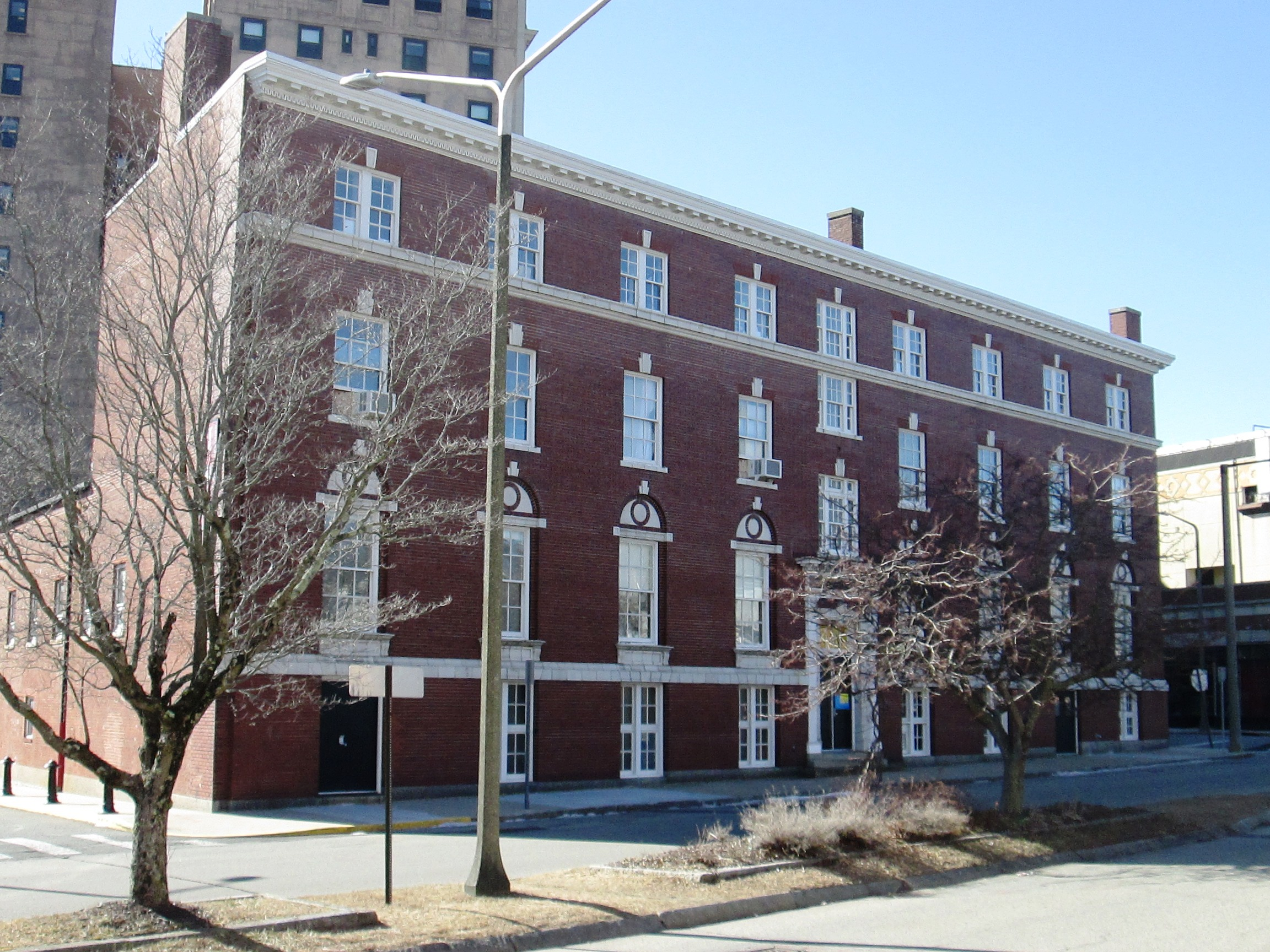
Y. M. C. A. Building, New London, Connecticut, 1915.

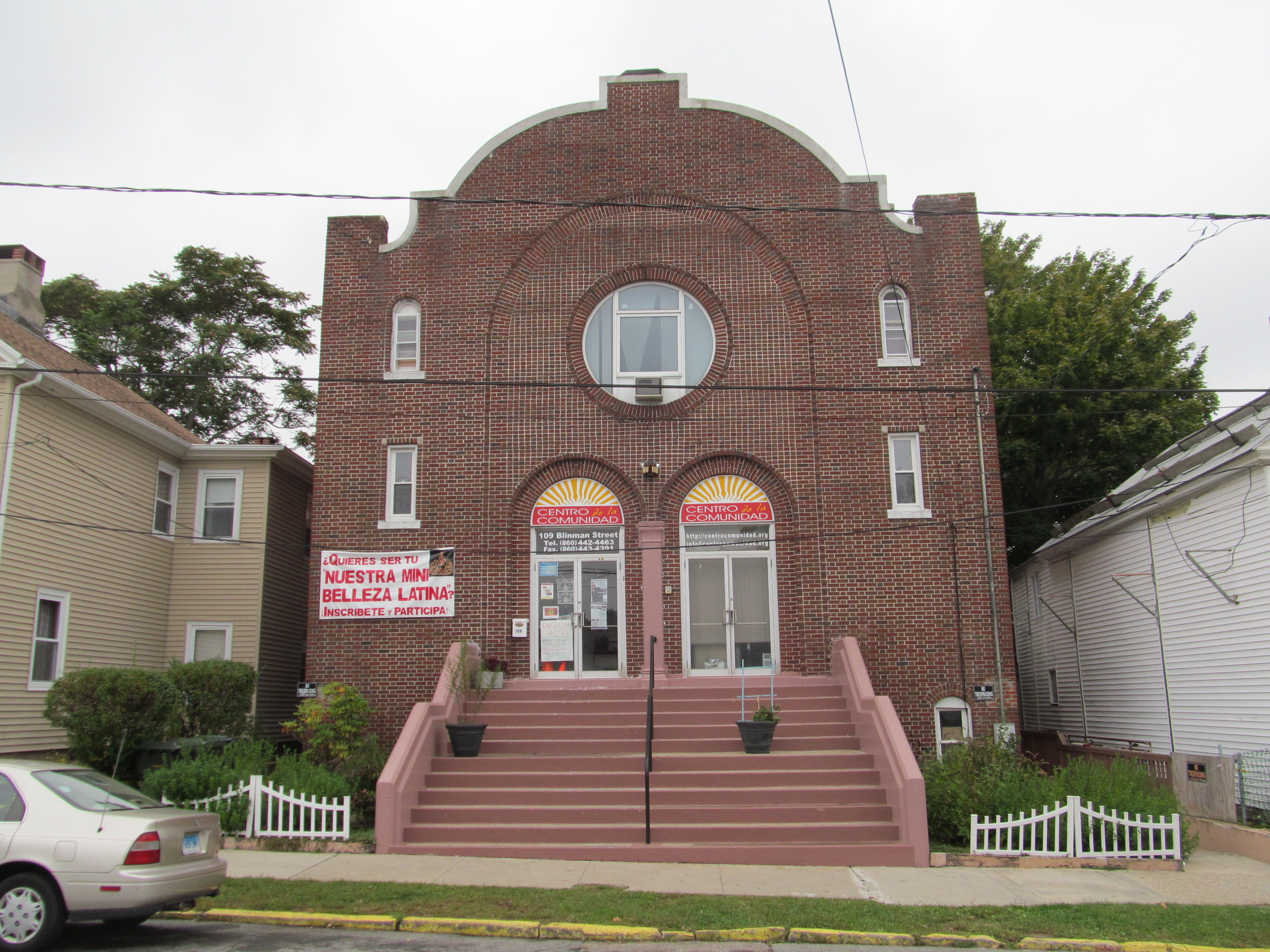
Ohev Sholem Synagogue, New London, Connecticut, 1919.
