= Belleview-Biltmore Hotel =

- Formerly listed on the U.S. National Register of Historic Places
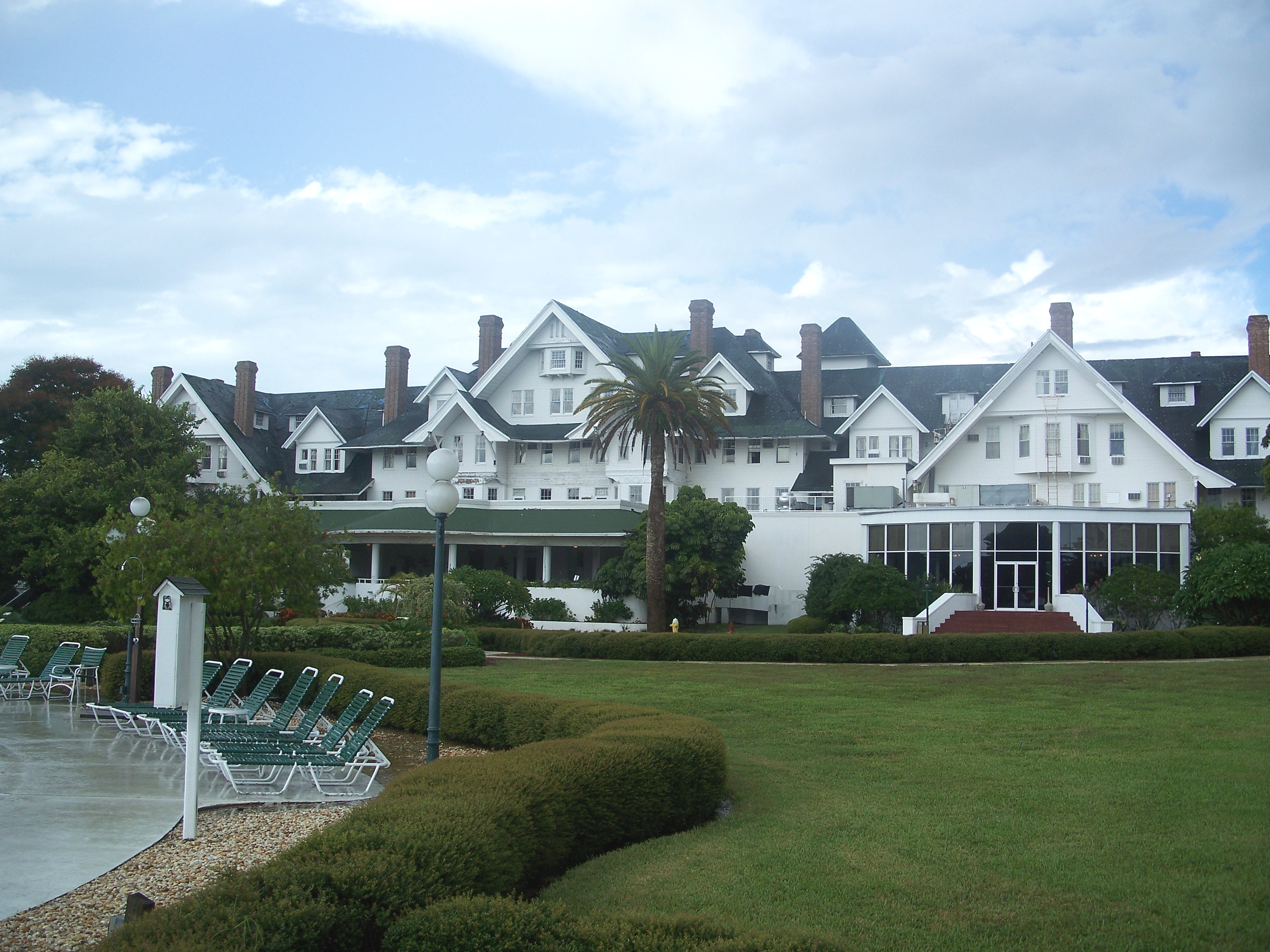
- The hotel in 2007

- Location within Florida Location within the United States
- Location: 25 Belleview Boulevard; Belleair, Florida
- Coordinates: 27°56′41.52″N 82°48′35.24″W
- Area: 4 acres (1.6 ha)
- Built: 1897
- Architect: Kennard, Francis J. Miller, Michael J.
- Architectural style: Queen Anne; Shingle Style
- Demolished: 2015, except for a portion of the original 1897 structure
- NRHP reference No.: 79000687

Significant dates
- Added to NRHP: December 26, 1979
- Removed from NRHP: October 2, 2017

The Belleview-Biltmore Resort and Spa was a historic resort hotel located at 25 Belleview Boulevard in the town of Belleair, Florida, United States. Partially demolished in 2016, the 350,000 square feet (33,000 m^{2}) hotel structure was the last remaining grand historic hotel of its period in Florida that existed as a resort, and the only Henry Plant hotel still in operation when it closed in 2009. The building was noted for its architectural features, with its green sloped roof and white wood-sided exterior, and handcrafted woodwork and Tiffany glass inside. Constructed of native Florida heart pine wood, it was the second-largest occupied wooden structure in the United States after 1938; only the Hotel Del Coronado in San Diego was larger.

The Belleview-Biltmore was situated on the highest point of the Florida coastline with views of the bay and the barrier islands which border the Gulf of Mexico. The hotel was built in the summer of 1896 by railroad tycoon Henry B. Plant and opened January 15, 1897. Originally known as the Belleview Hotel, it was added to the U.S. National Register of Historic Places on December 26, 1979, as Belleview-Biltmore Hotel and removed in 2017 following its relocation.

When the last member of the Plant family died in 1918 the hotel was sold to John McEntee Bowman founder of the Biltmore hotel chain. He renamed the hotel the Belleview-Biltmore in 1926 during a rebranding of his hotel chain.

The hotel closed in 2009 and thereafter the property deteriorated from neglect. Despite the hotel's historic designation and efforts by preservation groups to save it, various proposals to restore the property as a resort hotel were unsuccessful and the owners began demolition in 2015 for condominiums. The hotel was partially demolished in 2016. A portion of the 1897 structure was saved and relocated onto a new foundation; then restored as The Belleview Inn, a boutique inn. The Belleview Inn is a member of Historic Hotels of America.

The Belleview-Biltmore hosted dignitaries and world leaders through the years, including U.S. Presidents Barack Obama, George H. W. Bush, Jimmy Carter, and Gerald Ford, former British Prime Minister Margaret Thatcher and the Duke of Windsor, as well as celebrities such as Joe DiMaggio, Babe Ruth, Thomas Edison, and Henry Ford.

== History ==
=== Construction and Early Years ===
The land was originally purchased by railroad tycoon Henry B. Plant in 1893. Plant purchased the land as part of his expanding Plant System network of railroads, a railroad line serving the west coast of Florida. Initial construction began on the hotel during the summer of 1896, for a resort destination to boost tourist travel.

Constructed of native Florida heart pine wood, the Belleview Hotel opened its doors to the public on January 15, 1897. It was situated on the highest point of the Pinellas County coastline, with views of the bay and the barrier islands which border the Gulf of Mexico.

The hotel was noted for its Gilded Age architectural features. It was a noteworthy example of Queen-Anne era Victorian architecture in the United States. Details included exposed rafter tails, Victorian gingerbread ornamentation, peaked gables, overhanging roofs, and wide verandas.

The interiors were richly decorated, showcasing handcrafted woodwork and Tiffany glass inside. The latest amenities included steam-generated electricity and a lobby-based telegraph. The hotel became a popular Suncoast resort destination, playing host to many celebrities, politicians, and wealthy guests throughout the years.

Henry Plant's son, Morton Freeman Plant, took over operations after the death of his father in 1899. Morton painted the hotel in what would be later known as its signature color scheme. He painted the wood siding of the hotel in a bright white and changed the roof tiles to green.

=== Twentieth Century ===
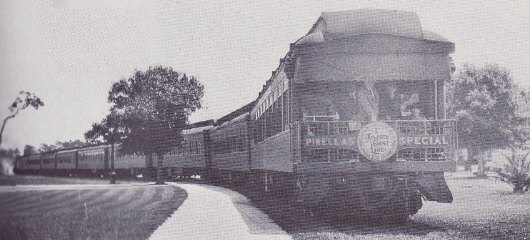
The Pinellas Special at the hotel

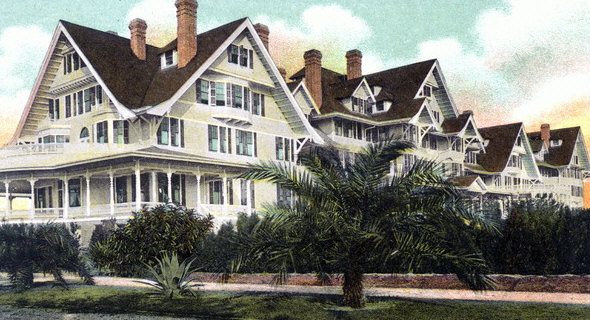
The hotel as it appeared in 1908

The Plant System of railroad lines was eventually absorbed by the Atlantic Coast Line Railroad network of railroad lines in 1902. The railroad continued to operate the Pinellas Special (trains nos. 95 and 96) train from New York City to a station located on the hotel's property.

Following Morton F. Plant's death in 1918, Morton's descendants sold the location to John McEntee Bowman of the Bowman-Biltmore Corporation of hotels. John McEntee Bowman purchased the hotel in 1919 and absorbed it into his growing, well-known Bowman-Biltmore Hotels. He renamed the hotel the Belleview-Biltmore in 1926 during a rebranding of his hotel chain. Bowman worked to enhance the hotel, adding on an additional wing of accommodations in 1925.

The hotel remained a popular tourism attraction under Bowman's ownership. It entertained the likes of the Studebakers, the Fords, the DuPonts, and the Vanderbilts. Visiting celebrities included Babe Ruth, Walter Hagen, and Thomas Edison. When the Great Depression struck, Bowman's company faltered, and they were forced to sell the business.

The hotel was requisitioned by the US Army Air Corps for use during World War II. It would be used to house troops as lodging for servicemen who were stationed at the nearby MacDill Air Force Base in Tampa. After World War II, the hotel was bought by Bernard F. Powell. Over the subsequent decades, the hotel's owners conducted a number of updates in order to maintain its appeal among contemporary travelers. New guest rooms and extra levels appeared, which caused its original size to balloon to a massive 820,000 sq. ft. Notable guests still visited as well, including U.S. Presidents Gerald Ford and Jimmy Carter.

In preparation for his 1976 Rolling Thunder Revue tour, musician Bob Dylan spent much of April rehearsing at the Belleview Biltmore with his troupe. Band members included Roger McGuinn of The Byrds, violinist Scarlet Rivera, and folk queen Joan Baez. Dylan would eventually play two shows on the 22nd in the hotel's Starlight Ballroom.

But the hotel underwent a slow decline starting around the 1980s. Many of the hotel's challenges related to its claim of being the nation's largest occupied wooden structure. In the 1980s, changing travel patterns and intensified competition from newer beach-front motels caused significant losses.

A Japanese company, Mido Development, purchased the hotel from Powell in 1990–1991, renaming it the Belleview-Mido Resort Hotel. Although Mido made many repairs to the structure, they were heavily criticized for diminishing the resort's historic appeal by adding a Pagoda-style new lobby and a larger, modern patio. Mido almost bankrupted the hotel in 1994, and the decision was ultimately made to sell the resort to hotelier Salim Jetha in 1997. Mido also neglected maintenance of the structure and the upper three floors were closed off and left in a varying state of disrepair.

=== Twenty-First Century and Decline ===
Beginning in 2001, attempts were made to restore common areas and guest rooms. During the summer of 2004, the hotel suffered glancing blows from hurricanes Jeanne and Francis, causing severe damage to an already deteriorated roof. This affected timelines and budget on the plans to fully restore the building. Protective coverings were placed over the roofing, while plans were made to replace this critical part of the building.

In late 2004, the DeBartolo Development Group offered to purchase the property from Urdang and Associates, to demolish the hotel structure and replace it with retail shopping and condominiums. The proposal was withdrawn in January 2005, however, after public outrage over the plan, the developers citing lack of public support. However, in April 2005, published reports said that the DeBartolo group was once again planning to purchase the hotel, and had it under contract with Urdang and Associates. Concerns were raised among historic preservationists when it was disclosed that DeBartolo had filed a demolition permit application with the Town of Belleair to demolish the Belleview Biltmore.

Preservationists argued that measures to protect historic structures should be adopted by Pinellas County or the Town of Belleair, citing hotels elsewhere of similar age which have been successfully restored while offering updated services and amenities, such as the Grand Hotel on Mackinac Island in Michigan, the Hotel del Coronado in San Diego, and the Williamsburg Inn in Williamsburg, Virginia.

On March 9, 2007, the St. Petersburg Times reported that Legg Mason Real Estate Investors had entered into a purchase contract to buy the resort, and intend to preserve the 110-year-old hotel. Historic preservation architect Richard J. Heisenbottle, FAIA, was brought on board to prepare restoration and re-development plans for the project. In May 2008, the Town of Belleair approved plans to restore and expand the hotel, which included a new spa and underground garages. Legg Mason (now Latitude Management Real Estate Investors) purchased the property in 2008 for $30.3 million.

=== Closure ===
On January 29, 2009, it was announced by Legg-Mason that the 400,000-square-foot hotel would close at the end of May 2009. After decades of decline and disrepair, many of the more than 260 rooms sat empty throughout the year. The entire hotel would undergo a three-year, $100 million renovation project. The hotel would reopen in 2012, the hotel's managing director said. Following the hotel's mid-2009 closing, however, an attorney for owner Legg Mason said that the renovation work has been stalled due to litigation by nearby residents, who objected to aspects of the re-development plans. Meanwhile, the Belleair code board voted on November 2, 2009, to begin fining the owners of the now-closed hotel $250 per day for failure to repair the hotel's "dilapidated and deteriorated" roof. In 2010, the Legg-Mason plan was withdrawn and other investors came forward.

Under BB Hotel LLC, Ades Brothers development group of Miami investors, purchased the vacant hotel and its assets for about $8 million in December 2011. A proposal to the city was submitted to tear down the existing structure and build townhouses on the site, with the townhouses containing elements from the original structure. The city government, according to reports, expressed willingness to approve demolition of the hotel. The proposal did not include formal plans describing what the owners want to build on the property, other than "residential new construction" as the proposed use. The owners said they may build as many as 180 townhomes or more, but it is not certain how many homes they'll build or whether their plans will include condominiums.

The owners then applied for a permit to raze most of the historic hotel. "The building cannot be restored as a hotel according to hotel developers we have talked to across the country," the owners wrote on a form aiming to remove the town of Belleair's historic designation for the property. The proposal also included a request to demolish the resort's cottages. A representative for the owner said they hoped to preserve a small part of the 115-year-old Biltmore, including the hotel's original lobby and the floor above it, with "the configuration of the remaining structure is to be determined."

On December 13, 2013, it was reported that another potential investor, Belleview Biltmore Partners LLC, was negotiating the lease and purchase of the hotel and the golf club, hoping to restore the hotel. Managing Partner Richard Heisenbottle said, "We do not subscribe to the theory that the landmark Belleview Biltmore Hotel & Resort is beyond repair and can no longer be restored."

Owners of the hotel sold off its waterfront property and condos popped up along its perimeter, blocking its previously famous views of the Intracoastal. With rotted ceilings and warped floors, appraisers estimated it would have cost $200 million to restore.

== The Belleview Inn ==
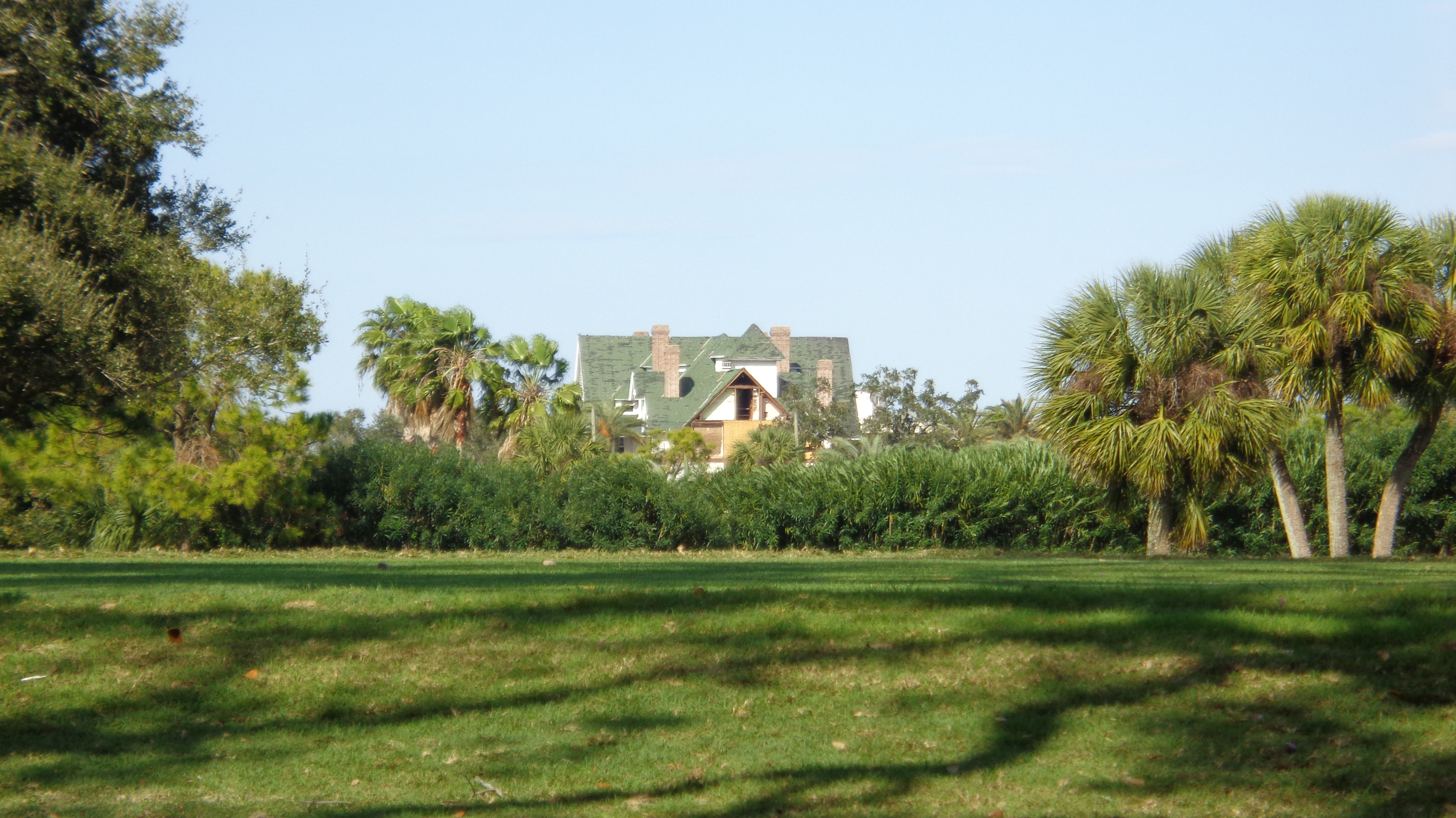
The preserved portion of the Belleview-Biltmore Hotel in December 2016

=== 90% Demolition ===
After years of renovations halted by the immense scale of the site, scope of work needing to be done, and annual hurricane seasons causing further damage to the structure. A new large-scale redevelopment plan for the site was approved in 2014. The Belleair Town Commission approved a $125 million large-scale redevelopment plan, from the owner of the Belleview Bilmore, JMC Communities.

This plan involved the complete demolition of 90 percent of the hotel – with a 10 percent portion to be preserved. This 38,000-square-foot piece includes the original lobby and 35 guest rooms. This saved portion of the hotel would be converted into a boutique inn. The plan included documentation of the hotel's history through photographs and written catalogs; and salvaged pieces from the original hotel incorporated into the decor.

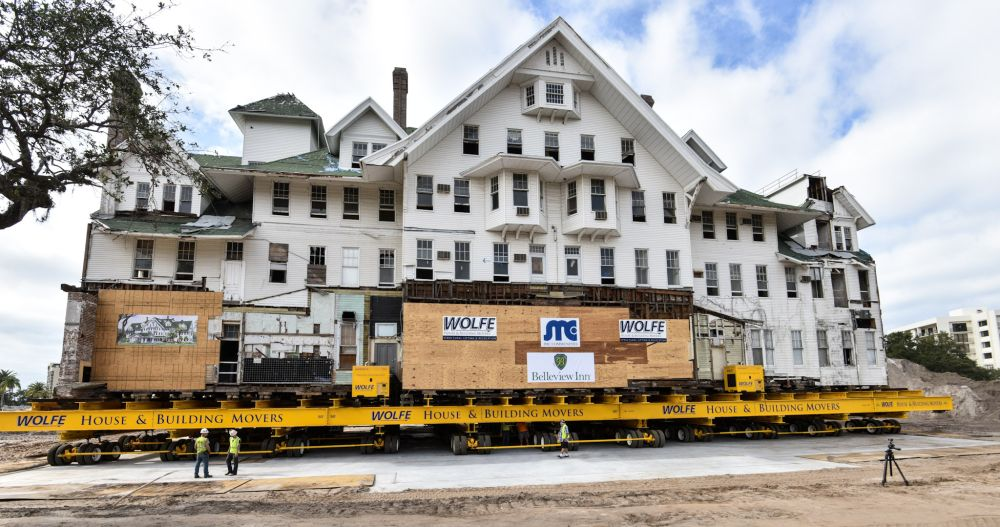
Wolfe House & Building Movers used the Buckingham Power Dolly System to re-locate a small part of the Belleview-Biltmore Hotel in December 2016

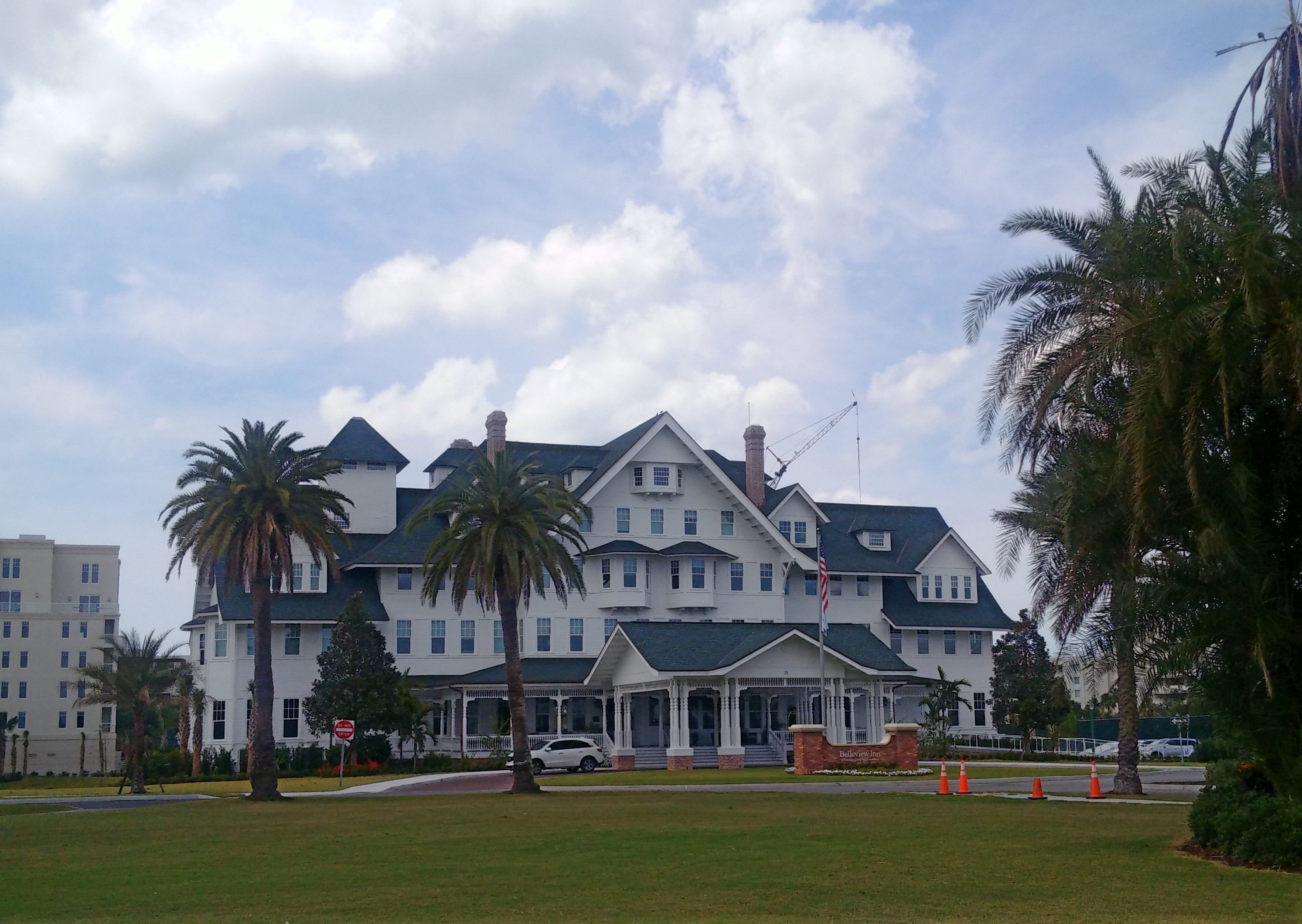
The renovated and reopened Belleview Inn in 2019

While the preserved segment was 10 percent the size of the entire Belleview-Biltmore at the time of demolition, the hotel had undergone numerous additions and wings to the structure over the decades. The preserved segment is, in fact, 70 percent of the original footprint of the 1897 Belleview Hotel.

The boutique inn would then be joined by 132 newly constructed condos and townhomes to be located on the site, according to the plans.

On May 9, 2015, demolition began by JMC, under principal developer Mike Cheezem.

The Friends of the Belleview Biltmore, a local organization fighting to save the historic structure, along with the Florida Trust for Historic Preservation, and the National Trust for Historic Preservation, sought an injunction to forestall further demolition. In December, 2015, the Belleair Town Attorney said that all lawsuits had been "voluntarily withdrawn" by the parties, thereby allowing the developer to proceed with continued demolition.

=== Redevelopment ===
On December 21, 2016, the preserved segment of the original hotel was placed on hydraulic dollies, rotated 90 degrees and moved 375 feet east of its original location. After the structure was mated to its new foundation the Belleview Biltmore Hotel was taken off the National Register of Historic Places, which it had been on since 1979. The building was officially removed from the National Register of Historic Places in October 2017.

Two years of restoration commenced and the downsized Belleview Inn opened on December 5, 2018. Limitations on commercial development in Belleair prohibited the hotel from operating in the same manner it had previously. The Inn operates as a limited-amenity boutique hotel.

The Belleview Inn continues to operate as Henry Plant's only Gilded Age resort hotel still welcoming guests, though no longer as a grand Victorian resort.

== See also ==
Henry B. Plant

Morton Freeman Plant

Bowman-Biltmore Hotels

Henry B. Plant Museum
