= Morton Freeman Plant Hunting Lodge =

- U.S. National Register of Historic Places
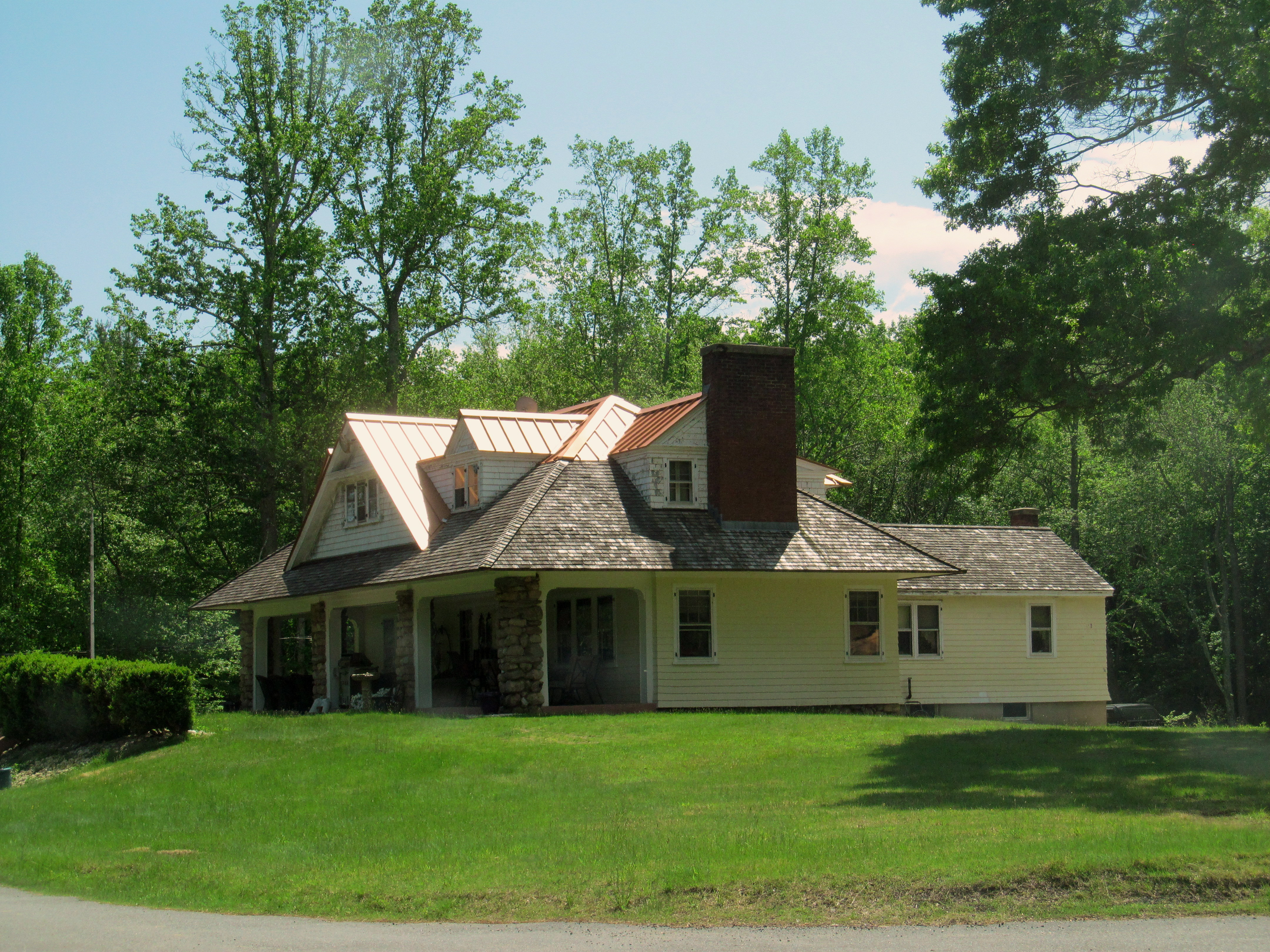
- Morton Freeman Plant Hunting Lodge in 2014

- Location within Connecticut Location within the United States
- Location: 56 Stone Ranch Road, East Lyme, Connecticut
- Coordinates: 41°21′25″N 72°15′59″W
- Area: 105 acres (42 ha)
- Built: 1908
- Architect: Dudley St. Clair Donnelly
- Architectural style: Bungalow/Craftsman
- NRHP reference No.: 88002691
- Added to NRHP: December 12, 1988

The Morton Freeman Plant Hunting Lodge is the centerpiece of a hunting retreat at 56 Stone Ranch Road in East Lyme, Connecticut. It is a large two-story Bungalow style house, designed by Dudley St. Clair Donnelly and built in 1908 by financier Morton Freeman Plant, and is one of the only early 20th-century purpose-built hunting lodges in the state. It was the heart of a large 2,400-acre (970 ha) private game preserve that Plant stocked with game birds. The property, now reduced to 105 acres (42 ha), is surrounded by town conservation land and a state military reservation. The property was listed on the National Register of Historic Places on December 12, 1988.

== Description and history ==
The Morton Freeman Plant Hunting Lodge is located in an isolated rural setting in western East Lyme. The lodge stands on 105 acres of land, nearly completely surrounded by town conservation land and a state National Guard training center, all land that was once historically associated with the lodge. There are two buildings on the lodge grounds, which are entirely wooded except for the clearing in which they stand, and Stone Ranch Road, which provides access. The lodge is a 1-1/2 story frame structure with a broad hip roof that creates an overhanging porch in the front, supported by stone piers. Dormers pierce three of the roof faces, and a single-story service ell extends to the rear of the main block. The interior of the building retains original finishes, including two concrete fireplaces built to resemble those found in 16th-century European manor houses.

Morton Freeman Plant's father, Henry Plant, made the family fortune by developing railroads in Florida. He took over his father's business in 1899. Born and raised in southeastern Connecticut, Plant began purchasing land in East Lyme and Lyme as a hunting retreat in 1907, which grew to about 2400 acres by 1914. The lodge was built in 1908 to a design by Dudley St. Clair Donnelly, a regionally prominent architect who executed a number of commissions for Plant. Plant died in the 1918 influenza pandemic, and the property was broken up by his heirs.

== See also ==
- National Register of Historic Places listings in New London County, Connecticut
