= Downtown New London Historic District =

Historic district in Connecticut

- U.S. National Register of Historic Places
- U.S. Historic district
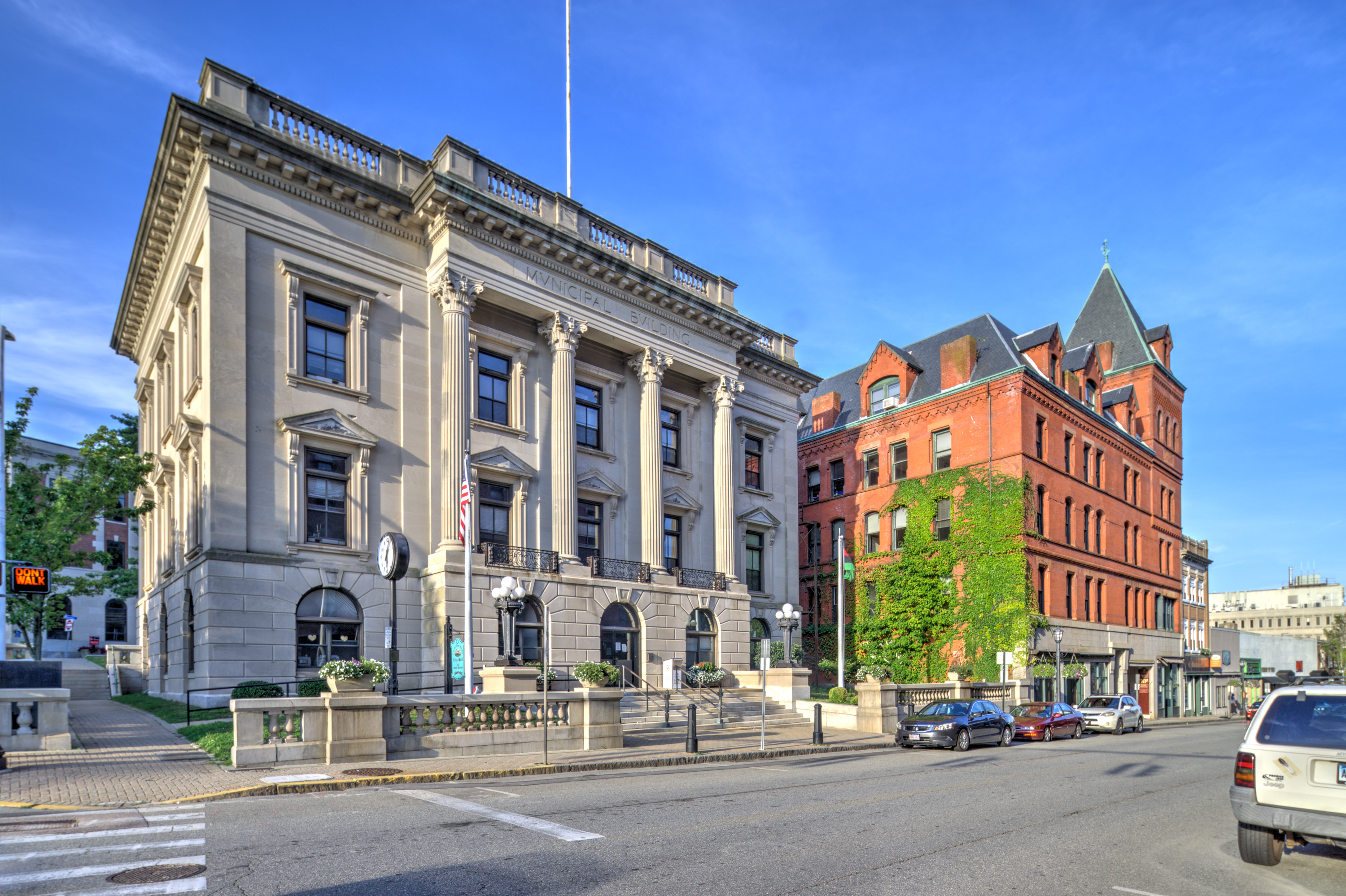
- State Street: City Hall and J.N. Harris Building (aka Lena Building)

- Location within Connecticut Location within the United States
- Location: Roughly bounded by State, Bank, Tilley and Washington Streets (original); along Huntington, Washington and Jay Streets; Southwest Corner of Meridan and Governor Winthrop Bou levard; along Bank and Sparyard Streets (boundary increase); New London, Connecticut
- Coordinates: 41°21′10″N 72°5′47″W
- Area: 60 acres (24 ha) (original); 18 acres (7.3 ha) (increase)
- Architect: multiple
- Architectural style: multiple
- NRHP reference No.: 79002665 (original); 88000070 (increase)

Significant dates
- Added to NRHP: April 13, 1979
- Boundary increase: February 18, 1988

The Downtown New London Historic District, also known as the Waterfront Historic District, refers to 78 acres (32 ha) with 222 contributing buildings along the waterfront of New London, Connecticut. It was added to the National Register of Historic Places (NRHP) in 1979, with 190 buildings and 60 acres (24 ha). The district was expanded in 1988, adding 18 acres (7.3 ha) and 33 buildings.

== History and description ==
=== Bank Street ===
Bank Street is so named because it sits atop the bank of the Thames River. It is one of New London's oldest sections and was once dominated by fishing wharves and tall ships. Benedict Arnold led British forces through New London in 1781, burning much of the city to the ground during the American Revolutionary War. The waterfront was subsequently rebuilt and the roadway was raised to accommodate additional development and larger ships.

The bank itself is now home to a number of restaurants, cafes, and boutiques and is dotted with a handful of 18th-century structures, including:

- the Shaw Mansion, built in 1753, which served as Connecticut Navy Headquarters during the American Revolution
- Bukeley House, built in 1796; the original owner of this house served with John Paul Jones

Bank Street also includes 19th-century buildings, including:

- New London Customhouse, built in 1833, the oldest such building continuously operated in the United States
- the Brown House at 258 Bank Street at the intersection of Tilley Street, built in 1833 in the Federal/Greek Revival style for Benjamin Brown, using the same materials as the Custom House including granite quarried from the ledge behind the house
- the site of the events surrounding the slave ship La Amistad

=== State Street ===
State Street runs east–west through the District from Huntington Street to Water Street and is lined with 19th-century buildings. Notable exceptions are the 1787 New London County Courthouse at the head of State Street, which was separately designated to the NRHP and is not part of the District, and the 1740 Timothy Green printing studio off State and Green Streets. At one time the 1774 Nathan Hale School House was located on State Street, but it has been moved to Atlantic Street north of the Soldiers and Sailors Monument.

State Street is also the location of a number of notable buildings, such as:

- Leopold Eidlitz's First Church of Christ (Congregational), was a Gothic Revival structure built in 1850, located at the corner of State and Union Streets. On 25 January 2024, the spire collapsed, and the building was destroyed beyond repair.
- the 1856 First Baptist Church at 268 State Street, designed in the Italianate style by William T. Hallett
- Eidlitz's Romanesque Revival Harris Place (1885) at 159 State Street, a mixed-use building which housed offices, eight luxury apartments, and the Hislop, Porteus & Mitchell department store
- Lyric Hall (1898) at 243 State Street, designed by James Sweeney, which had a small theater used for lectures and music and dance recitals
- Ewing & Chappell's 1905 Thames Club at 290 State Street
- James Sweeney's Beaux-Arts New London City Hall (1912), also known as the Municipal Building, at 181 State Street
- The 1930 Greek Revival bank building at 250 State Street
- Lena Building (originally J.N. Harris Building), 1884-1885
- The New London Public Library is also on State Street at the corner of Huntington Street, built in 1889-92 and designed by Shepley, Rutan & Coolidge in the Richardsonian Romanesque style.

Green Street is also part of the downtown historic area, just off State. It was laid out officially in 1787, and many of the buildings in this neighborhood date from 1760 to 1792 and survived the torch of Benedict Arnold. Eugene O'Neill's favorite watering spot was Dutch's Tavern, better known as The Dutch and housed in a 1760 building. The home at 79 Green dates to around 1801 and is known as The Richard Douglass House; Douglass was a veteran of the American Revolution, and the house is still a private residence.

Also in the immediate area is the Starr Street District, a group of row houses built in the first two decades of the 1800s. The New London Railroad Station is also within the physical confines of the district, but not part of it; it is separately listed on the NRHP like the Courthouse, Customhouse, and Public Library.

== Gallery ==
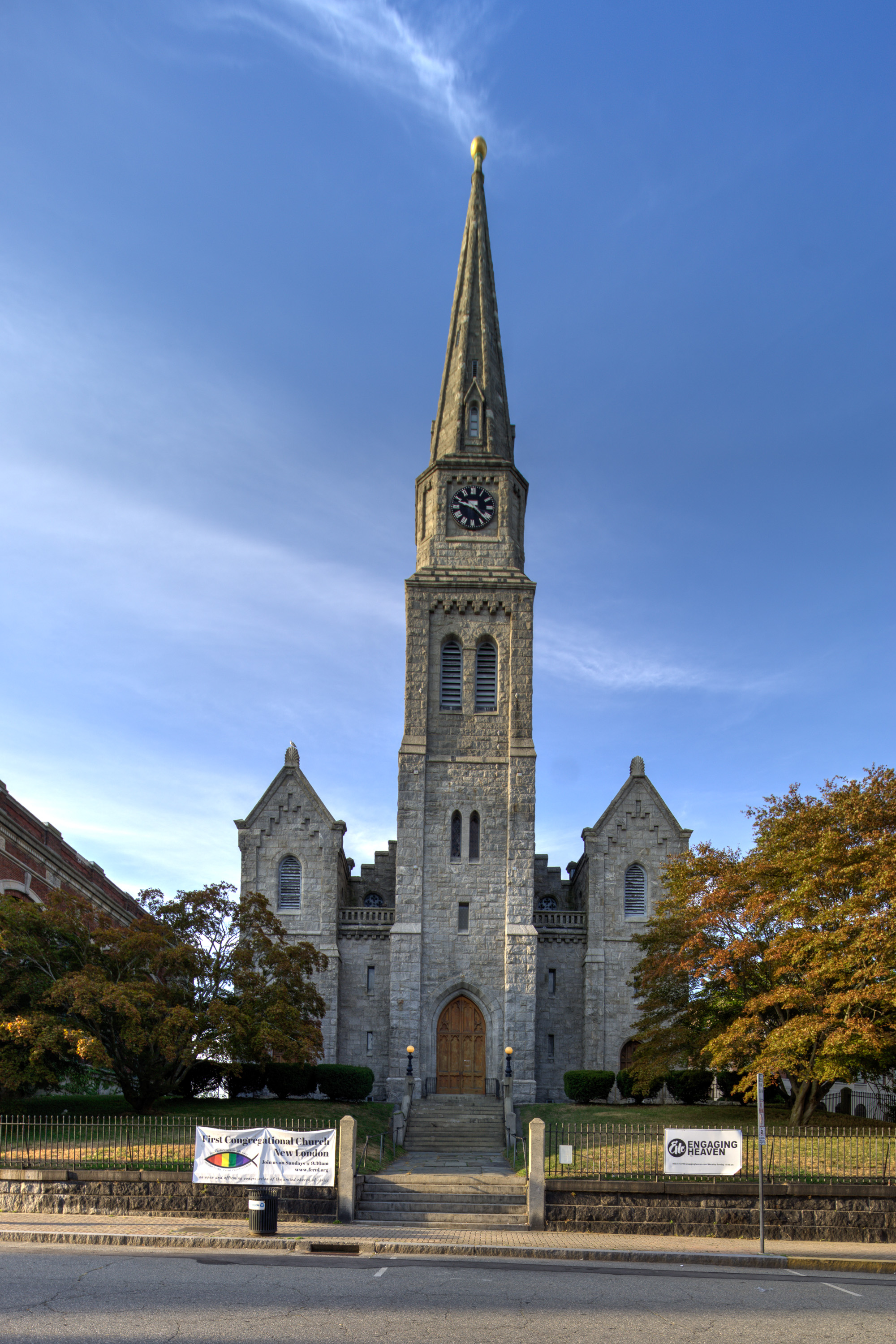
First Church of Christ (1850, destroyed 2024)

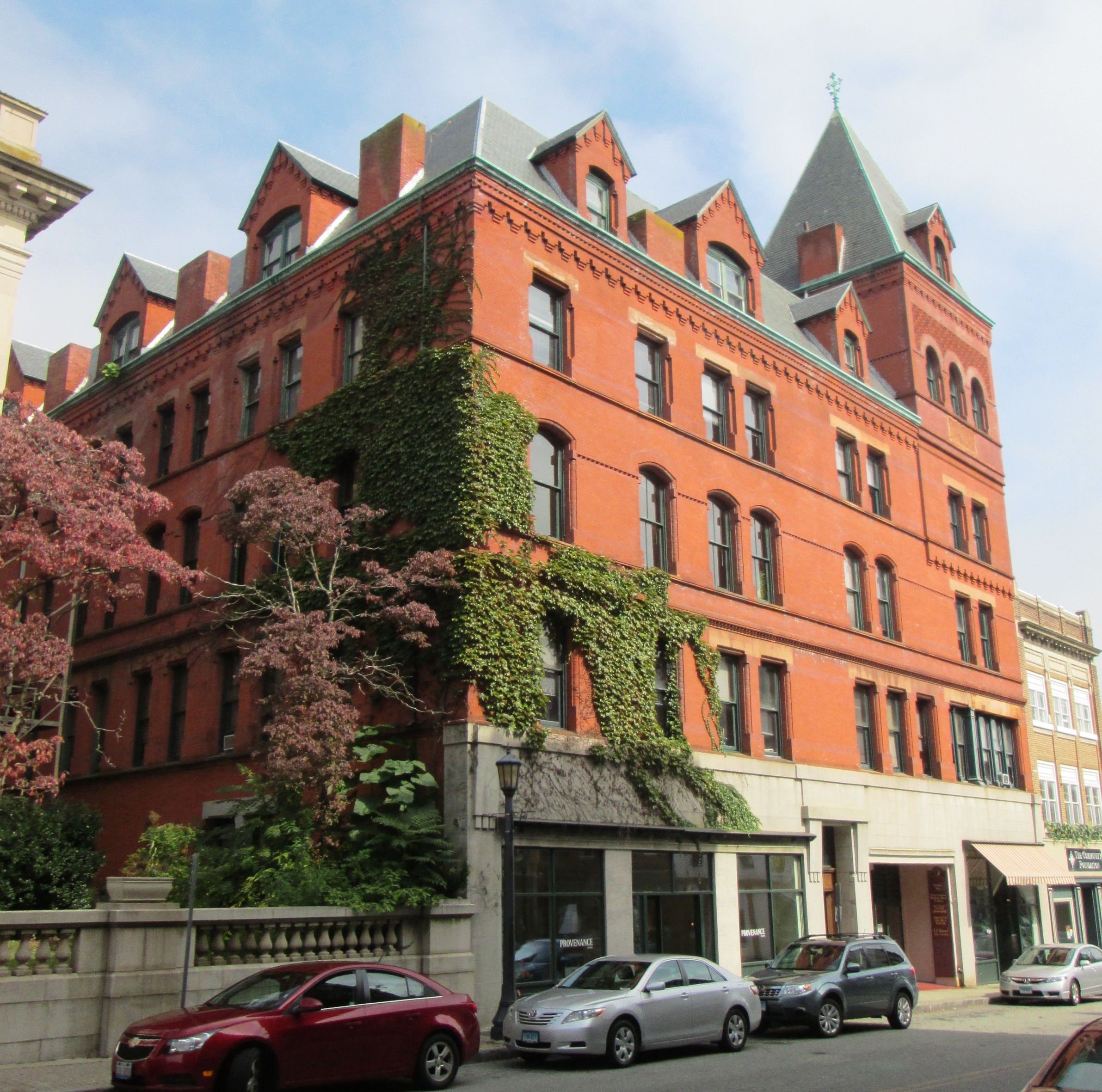
Harris Place (1885)

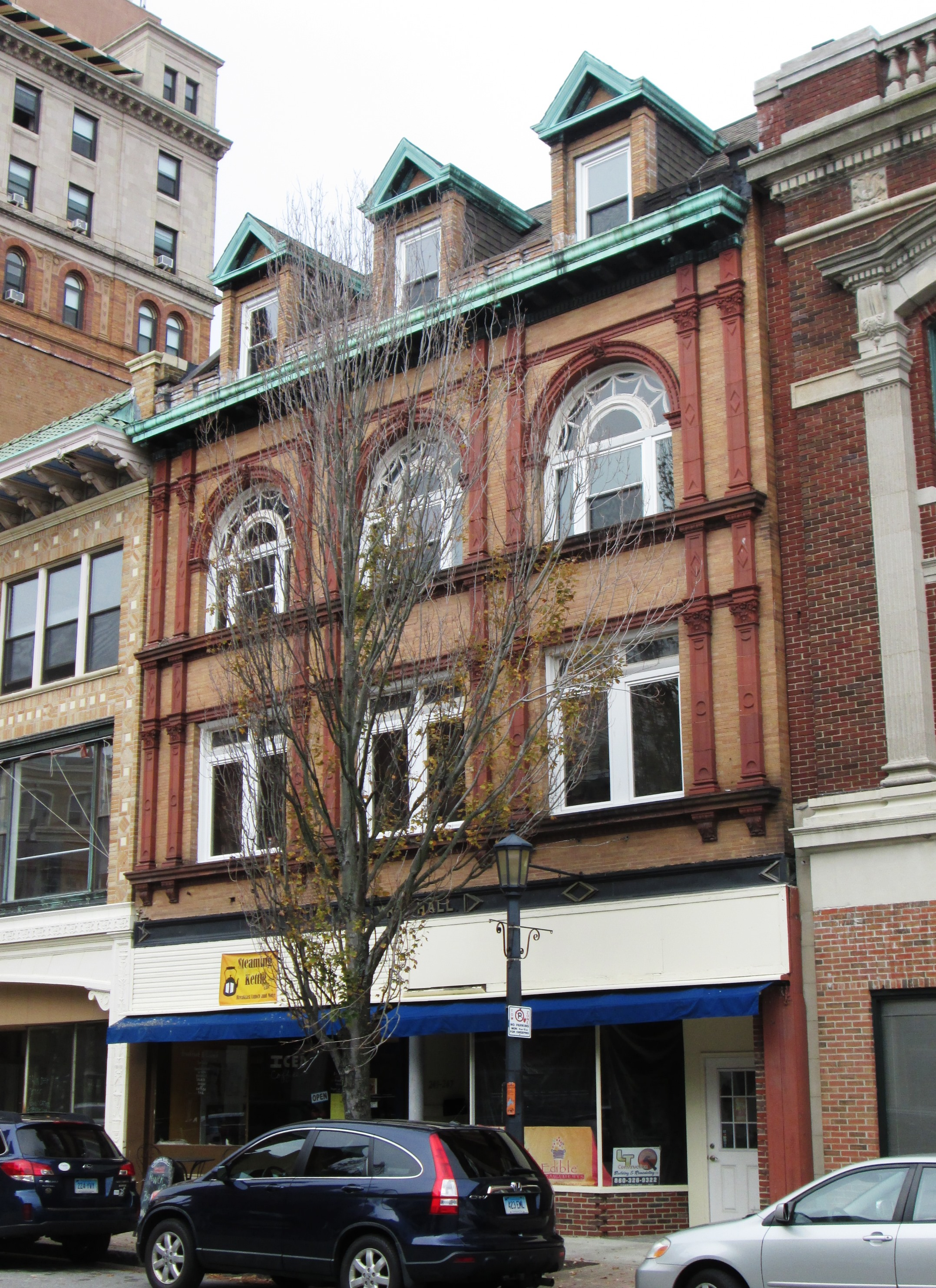
Lyric Hall (1898)

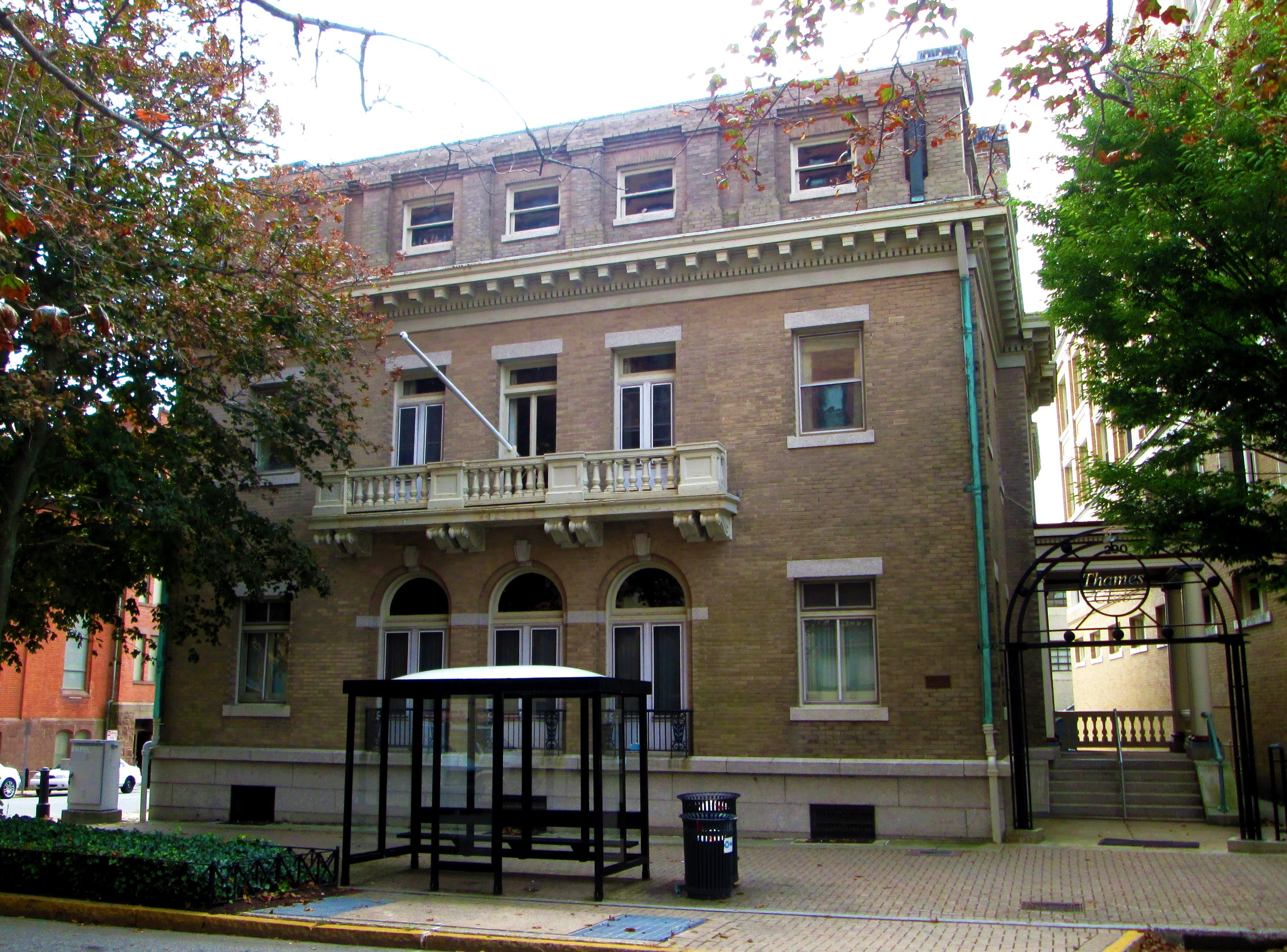
The Thames Club (1905)

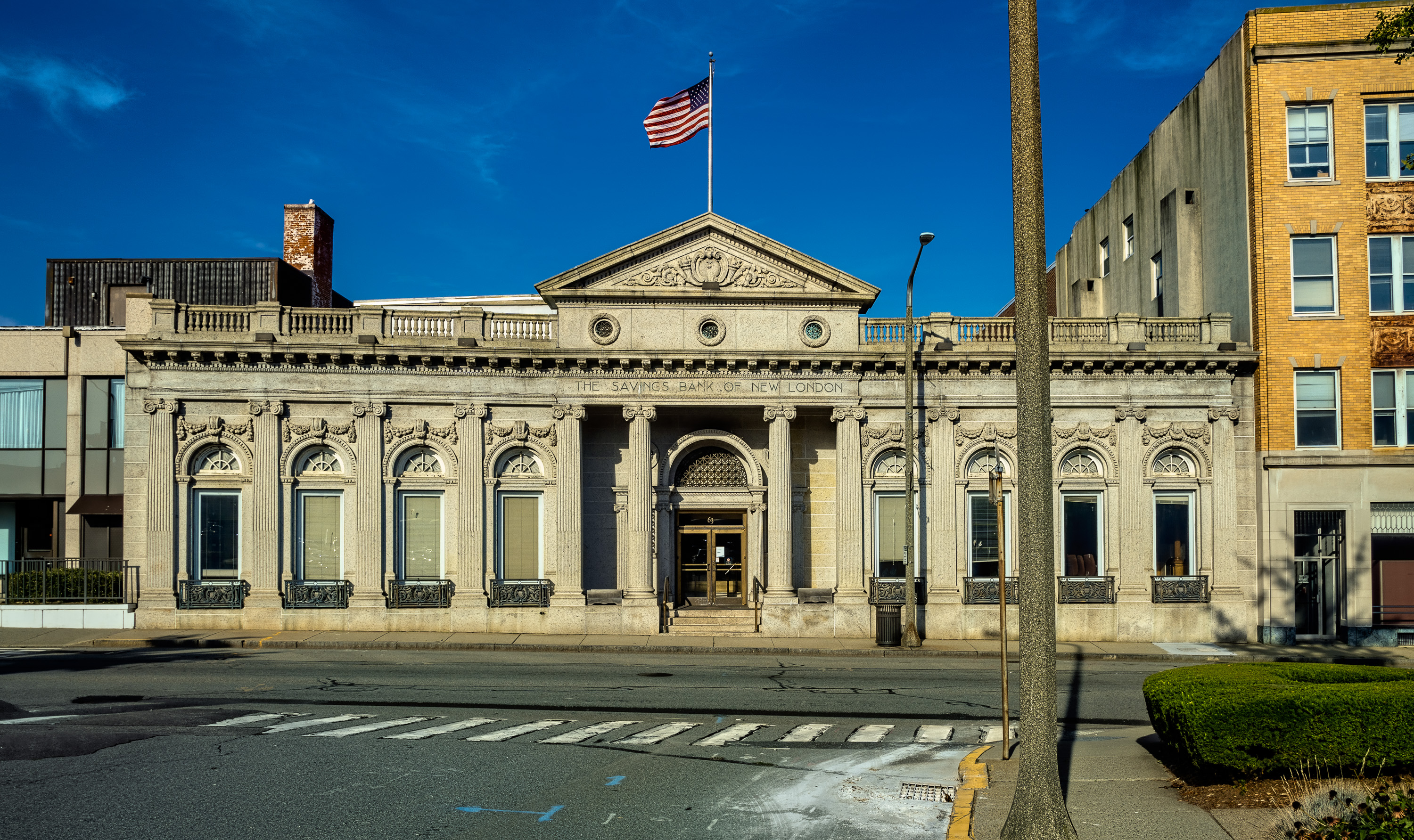
Savings Bank of New London (1905)

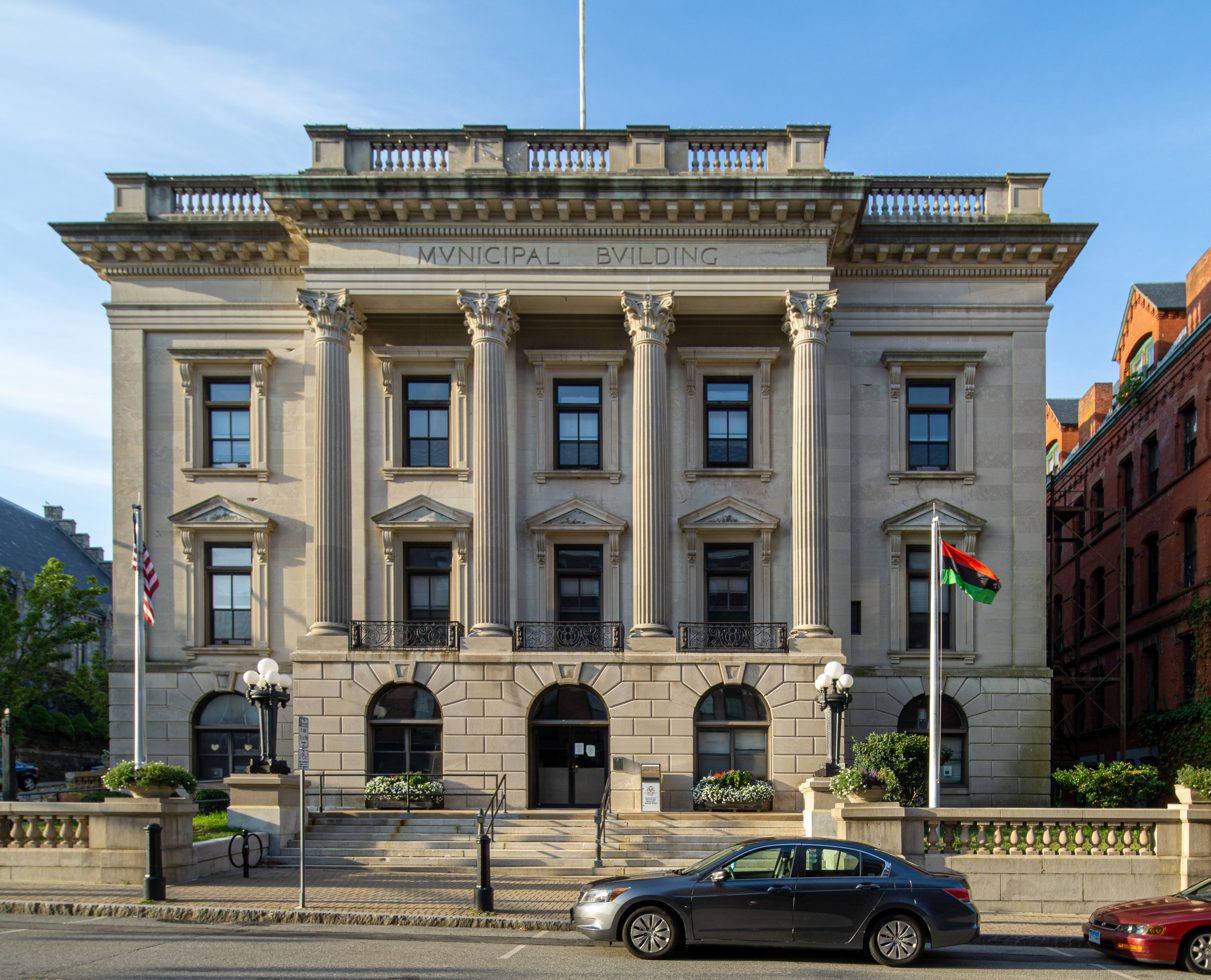
New London City Hall (1912)

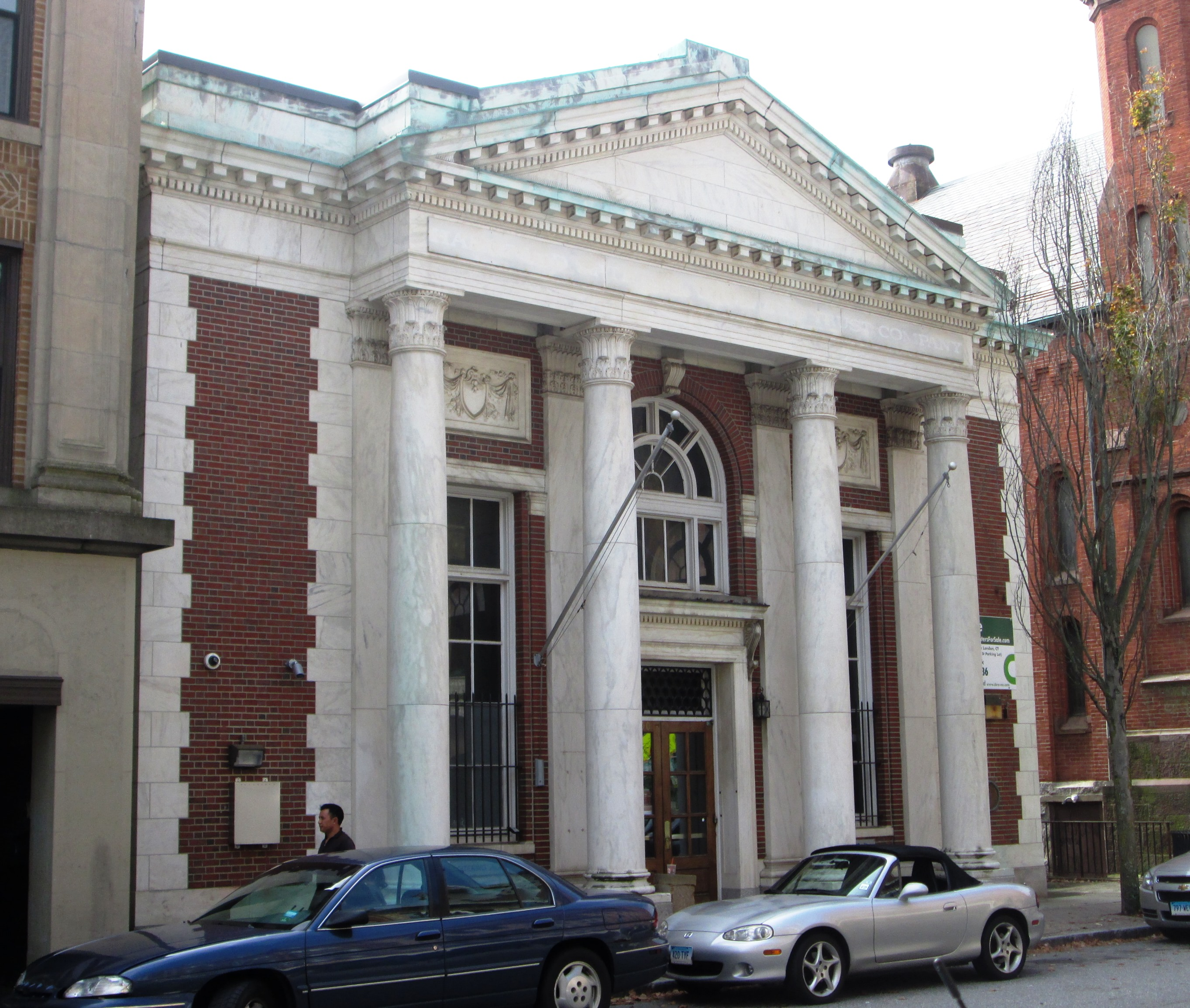
250 State Street (1930)

== See also ==
- National Register of Historic Places listings in New London County, Connecticut
