= Ohev Sholem Synagogue (New London, Connecticut) =

Historic former synagogue in New London, Connecticut, US

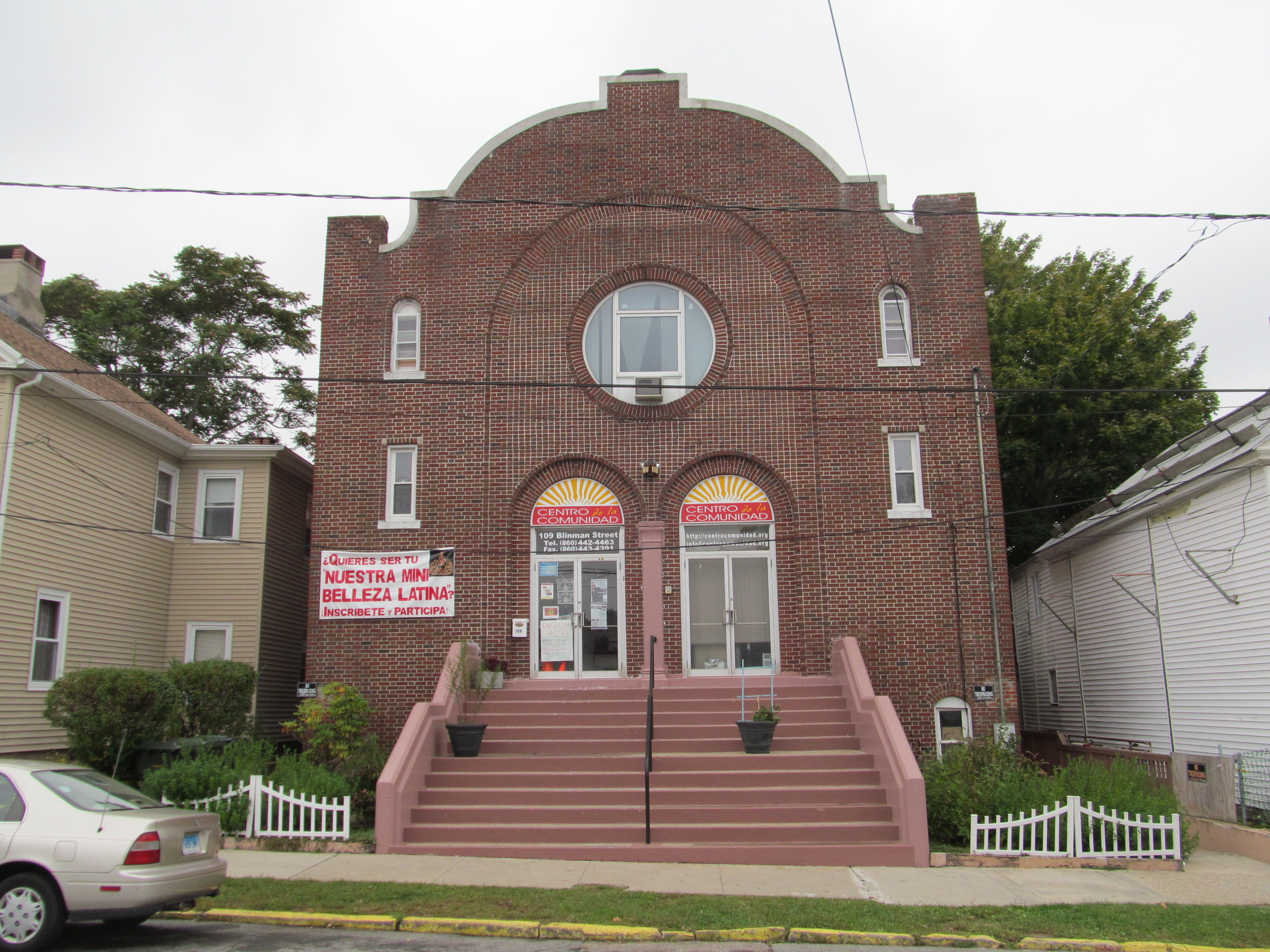
- The former synagogue, now community center, in 2012

- Location of the former synagogue in Connecticut

Religion
- Affiliation: Judaism (former)
- Ecclesiastical or organizational status: Synagogue (1920–1974)
- Status: Closed (as a synagogue)

Location
- Location: 109 Blinman Street, New London, Connecticut
- Country: United States
- Interactive map of Ohev Sholem Synagogue
- Coordinates: 41°21′4″N 72°6′9″W

Architecture
- Architect: Dudley St. Clair Donnelly
- Type: Synagogue
- Style: Classical Revival; Colonial Revival
- General contractor: Samuel Brody; Thomas Occhialini
- Established: c. 1916 (as a congregation)
- Completed: 1920
- Ohev Sholem Synagogue
- U.S. National Register of Historic Places
- Area: less than one acre
- MPS: Historic Synagogues of Connecticut MPS
- NRHP reference No.: 95000562
- Added to NRHP: May 11, 1995

The Ohev Sholem Synagogue is an historic former Jewish synagogue building, located at 109 Blinman Street in New London, Connecticut, in the United States.

Built in 1919-1920, the building is good example of the Classical Revival and Colonial Revival styles applied to synagogue architecture. The building served a religious function until 1974, when it was sold to a Latino community organization.

The building was listed on the National Register of Historic Places in 1995 for its architectural significance, and as part of a multiple property listing of fifteen historic synagogues in Connecticut.

== Description and history ==
Ohev Sholem is located west of New London's main business district, on the north side of Blinman Street between Truman and Bank Streets. It is a two-story masonry building, built out of red brick mostly laid in Flemish bond. Its entry has double doors separated by an engaged column, set in round-arch openings. A large circular window stands above the doors, within a large brick archway that encompasses it and the doors. Four small windows flank this arch, two on each side. The façade is crowned by a stepped segmental arch with short flanking posts. The interior has a vestibule area, with stairs leading up to a former gallery (now offices), with the main sanctuary including what appears to be an original chandelier, and a recess in which the ark housing the Torah would have been placed.

The Ohev Sholem congregation appears to have had its organizational original in a community support organization in which local Jews cared for their ill and infirm. That organization purchased the land on which the temple stands in 1916, and began construction of the building in 1919. The architect of the new building was Dudley St. Clair Donnelly and the builders were carpenter Samuel Brody and mason Thomas Occhialini, all of New London. The building is architecturally significant within the state for its distinctive combination of Classical Revival, Colonial Revival, and Romanesque Revival features. The congregation was merged with another in 1974, at which time the building was sold to La Centro de Comunidad, a Latino community organization. It is likely that certain trappings of Judaism (such as a probably Star of David in the circular window on the facade) have been removed from the building.

The former Ohev Sholem Synagogue building was one of fifteen Connecticut synagogues added to the National Register of Historic Places in 1995 and 1996 in response to an unprecedented multiple submission, nominating nineteen synagogues.

== See also ==
- National Register of Historic Places listings in New London County, Connecticut
