= Montauk Avenue Historic District =

Historic district in Connecticut, United States

- U.S. National Register of Historic Places
- U.S. Historic district
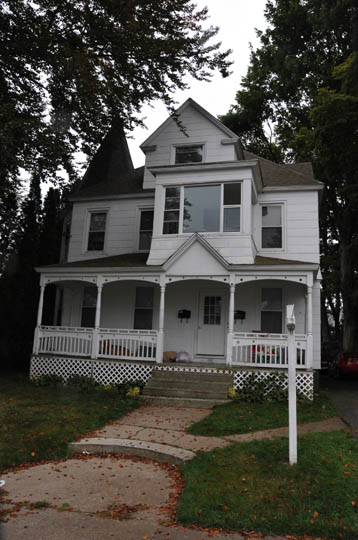

- Location within Connecticut Location within the United States
- Location: Roughly bounded by Ocean, Willets and Riverview Avenues and Faire Harbor, New London, Connecticut
- Coordinates: 41°20′20″N 72°6′22″W
- Area: 62 acres (25 ha)
- Architect: Multiple
- Architectural style: Late 19th And 20th Century Revivals, Late Victorian
- NRHP reference No.: 90001910
- Added to NRHP: December 18, 1990

The Montauk Avenue Historic District encompasses a residential area of New London, Connecticut that was a planned subdivision developed in the early 20th century as a "streetcar suburb". The district consists of 341 buildings and was added to the National Register of Historic Places on December 18, 1990. The district's main thoroughfares are Montauk Avenue and Ocean Avenue, which roughly define its western and eastern bounds, and it includes small cross streets between Willetts Avenue and Fair Harbour Place. Most of the district's houses were built after 1895, and are wood-frame structures in vernacular renditions of architectural revival styles popular in the early 20th century. Transitional forms between Queen Anne and other styles predominate. There are only four non-residential buildings in the district, all of which are masonry (either brick or stone): two schools, a church, and a fire station.

Before the late 19th century, the area south of Willetts Avenue was rural farmland, outside the city limits of New London. Only a few buildings stood in the area, including a few houses on Willetts Avenue and a surviving small district schoolhouse on Ocean Avenue, built in 1855 in the Greek Revival style. In 1892, a horsecar trolley running along Montauk Avenue to the southern shore was electrified. Thomas M. Waller, a prominent local attorney and politician, was a major shareholder in the trolley line, and became one of the principal developers of the Montauk Avenue area. He and Frank Brandegee laid out the land between Ocean and Montauk Avenues for development, including the small parks at the centers of Faire Harbour and Bellevue Places. They ran utility lines and graded and prepared lots, which were typically sold to builders with deed restrictions on what could be built. Larger lots were laid out along the two main thoroughfares, and more dense development took place on the side streets.

== See also ==
- National Register of Historic Places listings in New London County, Connecticut
