= JMC Communities =

- Type: Private
- Industry: Real estate
- Founded: 1978
- Headquarters: Saint Petersburg, Florida
- Website: www.jmccommunities.com

JMC Communities is a property developer in Florida. It developed the Sandpearl Resort on Clearwater Beach, built the Mandalay Beach Club and Belle Harbor condominium projects on Clearwater Beach and is planning to build a 6-story condo development (Rowland Place) in downtown St. Petersburg, Florida. JMC previously built the Ovation "mega-tower" in St. Pete. The CEO of JMC Communities is Mike Cheezem.

== Services ==
JMC provides a service business plan covering development/contracting general, various project or construction know-how, sales and marketing, coordinating home layout, in-house warranty, property management, environmental construction techniques and closing services.
