= Morton Freeman Plant =

American financier

Morton Freeman Plant (August 18, 1851, in Branford, Connecticut – November 4, 1918, in New York City) was an American financier.

== Biography ==
Morton Freeman Plant was the son of Henry Bradley and Ellen Elizabeth (Blackstone) Plant. His father was a pioneer railroad builder in the South. He received his early education at Russell's Military School, New Haven, Connecticut, and at the age of 16 entered the employ of the Southern Express, which at that time was owned by his father. Later, he was chairman of the express company's board of directors.

In 1884, he became identified with his father's railroad lines in the South, and was vice president of what was known as the Plant System. He remained vice president until May 13, 1902, when the Plant System was consolidated with the Atlantic Coast Line Railroad. He continued to serve as director of the latter company until his death.

He was also owner of the Plant steamship lines founded by his father. He was also vice-president and director of the Chicago, Indianapolis & Louisville Railroad Co.; chairman of the board of directors of the Southern Express Co.; trustee of the Connecticut Trust & Safe Deposit Co. of Hartford; vice president and director of the Peninsular & Occidental Steamship Co.; director of the Interborough Rapid Transit Co. of New York, the Lincoln Trust Co., the Windsor Trust Co., the Bowling Green Trust Co. of New York, the Casualty Company of America, and the National Bank of Commerce of New London, Connecticut. Beside these numerous interests, Plant also owned the Shore Line Electric Railway - at the time one of the largest single trolley systems in the United States - and a number of hotels and summer resorts in various parts of the Union, among them the “Griswold Hotel” less than a mile up the Thames River in Groton, Connecticut from The Branford House and the “Belleview” in Florida.

He did much for the development of New London, building roads, churches, office buildings, and hotels, and extending trolley lines. His country seat, Branford House at Avery Point, Groton, Connecticut, was one of the most perfectly equipped farms in the United States.

Plant was especially distinguished for philanthropic spirit, one of his pet benevolences being to send bright young people to school. His most notable philanthropy was his assistance in founding Connecticut College for Women at New London. His gifts to this institution included $25,000 towards the purchase of the site; $1,000,000 for the endowment; two dormitories, Plant and Blackstone halls, in memory of his father and mother and costing $60,000 each; and a legacy of $250,000. As first chairman of the college's board of trustees, he assisted it through the most trying periods of its history. In appreciation of his great services, the college conferred upon Plant the honorary degree of LL.D. at its opening exercises in 1915. Plant was also a Trustee of the Pomfret School, and he donated a dormitory which is named in his honor.

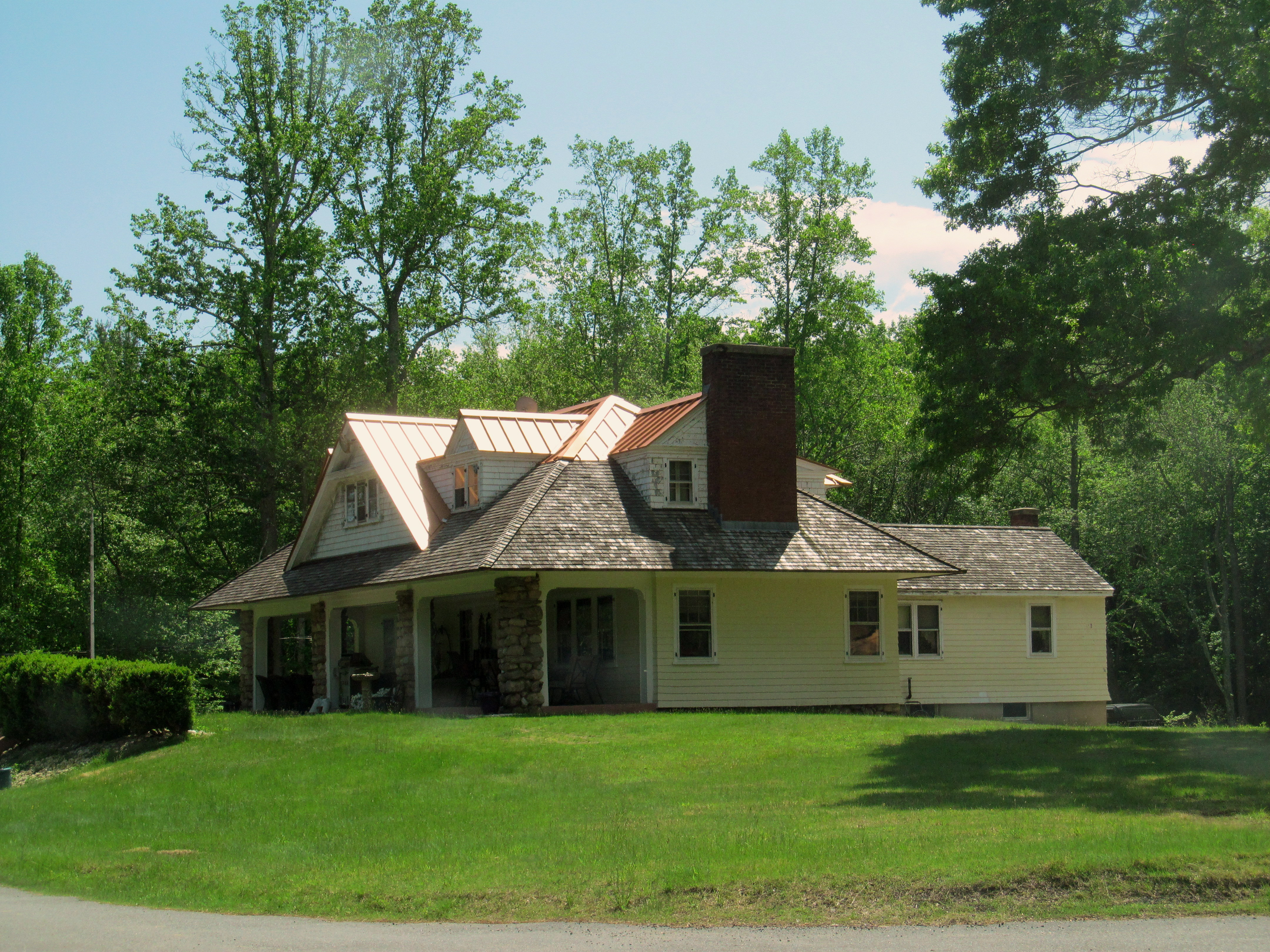
Morton Freeman Plant Hunting Lodge

Plant was an enthusiastic sportsman, his favorite recreations being yachting, baseball, and golf. He owned the steel schooner “Ingomar,” built by Nat Herreshoff, which entered twenty-two races in one season abroad and won nineteen prizes. He also owned the schooner yacht “Elena”, which likewise won many races, chief among her victories being that over A. S. Cochran's “Westward” in 1911, after the “Westward” had beaten the best yachts in English and German waters. He also owned the steam yachts “Venetia,” “Iolanda,” and “Vanadis.” During 1909-10, he and a party of friends made a voyage around the world in the “Iolanda,” publishing an interesting account of the trip in the book The Cruise of the “Iolanda”. Plant was a member of the Atlantic Yacht Club, Corinthian Yacht Club, the New York Yacht Club, and the Larchmont Yacht Club, having been commodore of the last.

He owned a large part of the Philadelphia National League baseball club and was sole owner of the New London Eastern League club. He was also fond of shooting, and owned a fine game preserve at East Lyme, Connecticut. He was a member of the Manhattan Club, Automobile Club, Ardsley Club, and the Racquet and Tennis Club. He was twice married. His first wife was Nellie Capron, daughter of Francis Brown Capron of Baltimore, whom he married in Baltimore, Maryland on June 23, 1887. Nellie died on August 7, 1913, leaving one son, Henry Bradley Plant. On June 16, 1914, Plant married May Cadwell Manwaring of New London.

His former 1905 mansion on Fifth Avenue in New York City, the Morton F. Plant House, is now the home of Cartier. In 1916 he moved to 1051 Fifth Avenue at 86th Street. Plant died of pneumonia at that house in 1918, aged 66.

== See also ==
- Morton Plant Hospital, hospital in Clearwater, Florida, that Plant co-funded
