= New London County Courthouse =

- U.S. National Register of Historic Places
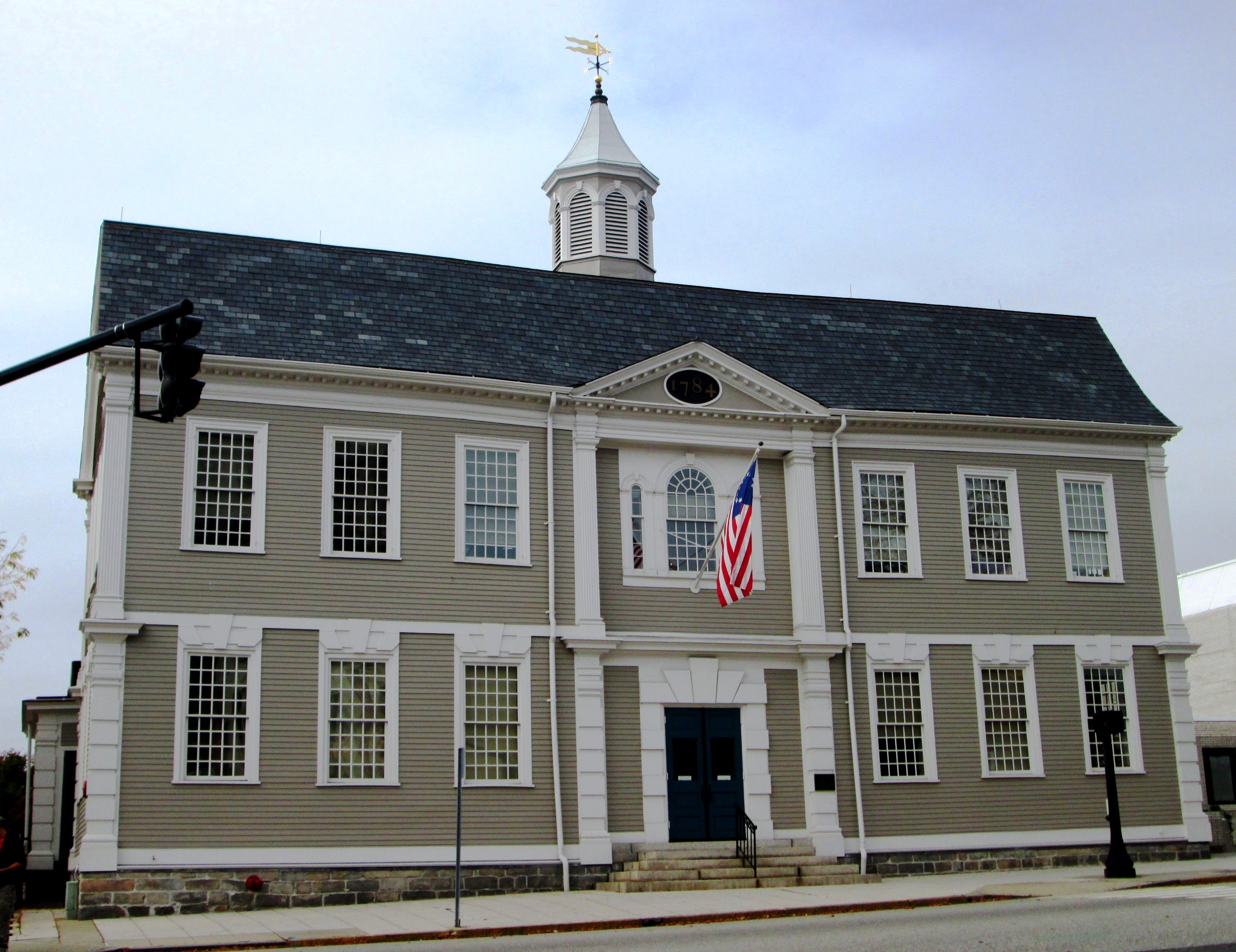
- (2013)

- Location within Connecticut Location within the United States
- Location: 70 Huntington Street; New London, Connecticut
- Coordinates: 41°21′18″N 72°6′1″W
- Built: 1786
- Architect: Isaac Fitch (attributed); Dudley St. Clair Donnelly (1909 addition)
- NRHP reference No.: 70000705
- Added to NRHP: October 15, 1970

The New London County Courthouse is a historic courthouse located at 70 Huntington Street at the top of State Street in New London, Connecticut. It was built in 1784–86, and its design is attributed to Isaac Fitch. It is the oldest courthouse in Connecticut according to a plaque on the building, and the State of Connecticut Superior Court sits there. It was added to the National Register of Historic Places in 1970.

== Description and history ==
The New London County Courthouse is prominently situated at the junction of State and Huntington Streets in Downtown New London, Connecticut. It is a 2½ story wood-frame structure topped by a gambrel roof with an octagonal cupola at its center. Its exterior is seven bays wide and finished in wooden clapboards. Corners on the first floor are finished with wooden quoin blocks scored to resemble stone, while pilasters are used on the second floor corners. The central bay of the main facade is wider than the others and projects slightly, with a gabled top. The sides of this projection are finished similarly to the building corners. The main entrance is in the center, framed by quoin blocks, with a Palladian window in the second-story bay above.

The courthouse was built in 1784, its design attributed to Isaac Fitch. It has served other purposes besides a courthouse, including a yellow fever hospital in the 1790s and a recruiting center for the Union Army during the American Civil War. Town meetings and other civic affairs were also held here for many years. An addition constructed in 1909 was designed by Dudley St. Clair Donnelly.

== See also ==
- National Register of Historic Places listings in New London County, Connecticut
