= James Sweeney (architect) =

American architect

- Born: December 27, 1868; New London, Connecticut
- Died: July 3, 1919 (aged 50); New London, Connecticut
- Occupation: Architect

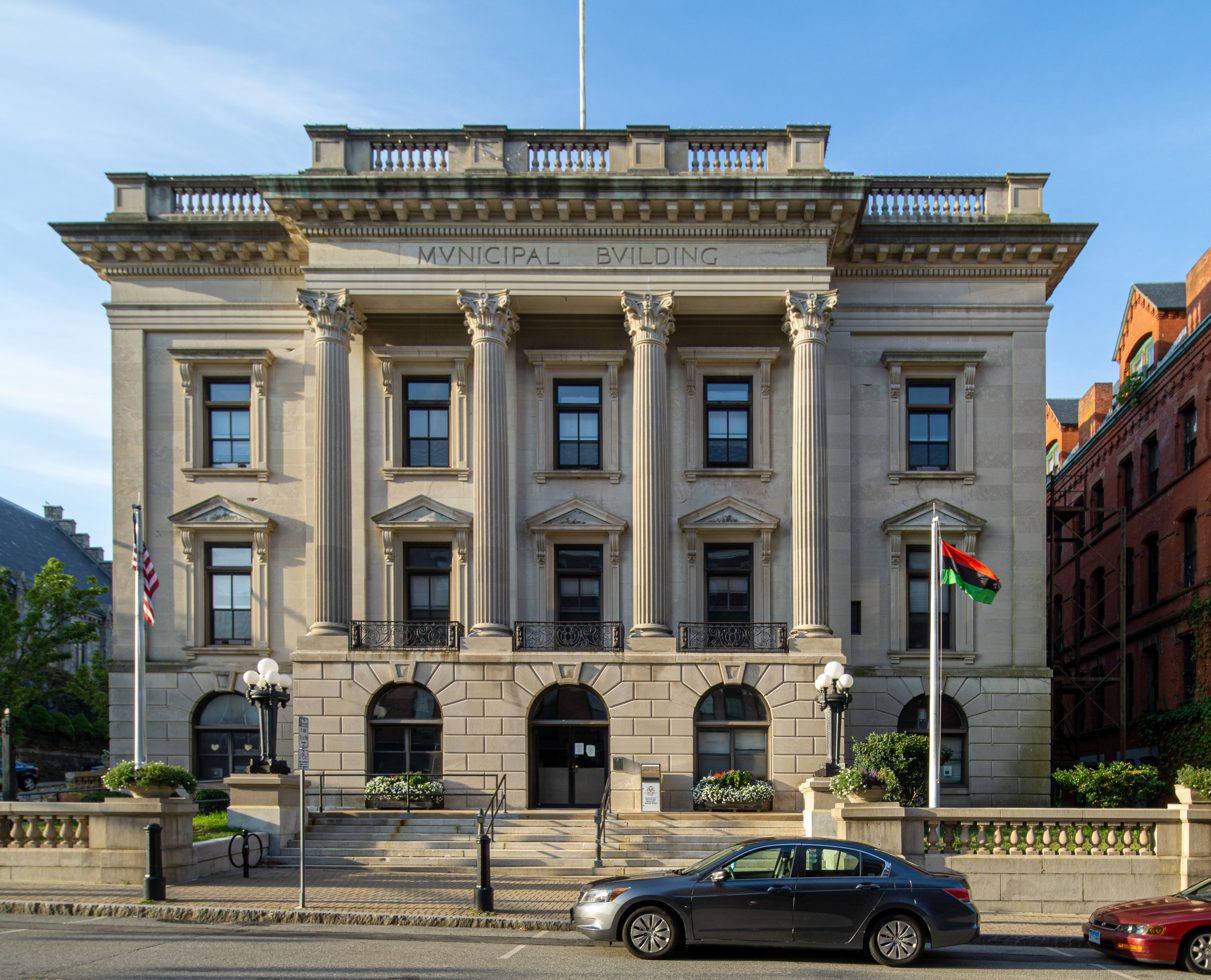
The New London Municipal Building, reconstructed to Sweeney's designs in 1912.

James Sweeney (1868-1919) was an American architect practicing in New London, Connecticut.

== Life and career ==
James Sweeney was born December 27, 1868, in New London, Connecticut, to John Sweeney and Bridget (Halvey) Sweeney. After an education at the Bulkeley School, he worked for the New London water department, where he learned the essentials of drafting and civil engineering. Circa 1888 he began working for George Warren Cole, representative in New London of the Boston firm of Shepley, Rutan & Coolidge, and worked on projects such as the New London Public Library and the Williams Memorial Institute (both 1889–91). In 1891, when Cole established an independent office in New London, he made Sweeney his chief assistant. When Cole died in 1893 his Boston partner, Joseph Everett Chandler, consolidated his practice in Boston, and Sweeney took over the business in New London. He built extensively in New London, his most prominent work being the Beaux-Arts reconstruction of the New London Municipal Building in 1912.

Sweeney was a private practitioner for his entire professional career, and continued to work until his death in 1919. After his death, his practice was purchased by Halifax architect A. Graham Creighton, who then lived and practiced in New London for forty years. (Note: Creighton (1886-1977) attended the University of Toronto and practiced architecture in Saskatchewan and Nova Scotia from 1907 to 1920. In Connecticut, Creighton was architect of the Hand Academy (1921) in Madison, Buell Hall (1933-34) on the former campus of the Williams Memorial Institute and Buck Lodge (1937) in the Connecticut College Arboretum, both New London. Creighton retired in 1964.)

Sweeney preferred the Colonial Revival style for his architecture, though he used elements of Beaux-Arts architecture in his large municipal projects and the Gothic Revival style for his only church.

== Personal life ==
Sweeney was elected a member of the American Institute of Architects in 1912.

Sweeney died July 3, 1919, in New London.

== Legacy ==
At least two of Sweeney's works have been listed on the United States National Register of Historic Places, and others contribute to listed historic districts.

== Architectural works ==
- Lyric Hall, (Note: A contributing property to the Downtown New London Historic District, listed on the National Register of Historic Places in 1979 and expanded in 1988.) New London, Connecticut (1897)
- St. Mary R. C. School (former), New London, Connecticut (1898)
- House for James P. Murphy, (Note: A contributing property to the Montauk Avenue Historic District, listed on the National Register of Historic Places in 1990.) New London, Connecticut (1901)
- Union Bank and Trust Company Building, New London, Connecticut (1905, demolished)
- Harbor School, New London, Connecticut (1907)
- Mabrey Hotel, New London, Connecticut (1910)
- Old Saybrook Town Hall (former), (Note: Now (2021) the Katharine Hepburn Cultural Arts Center.) Old Saybrook, Connecticut (1910–11, NRHP 2007)
- New London Municipal Building, New London, Connecticut (1912)
- House for Ludwig Mann, New London, Connecticut (1915)
- Our Lady of Perpetual Help R. C. Church (former), (Note: Now (2021) the International Family Worship Center.) New London, Connecticut (1915)
- Thames Hall, Connecticut College, New London, Connecticut (1915, demolished 1990)
- Flanders School (former), East Lyme, Connecticut (1916)
- New London Almshouse, (Note: A contributing property to the Civic Institutions Historic District, listed on the National Register of Historic Places in 1990.) New London, Connecticut (1916–17)
- Quaker Hill School, (Note: A contributing property to the Quaker Hill Historic District, listed on the National Register of Historic Places in 2002.) Waterford, Connecticut (1917)

== Gallery of architectural works ==
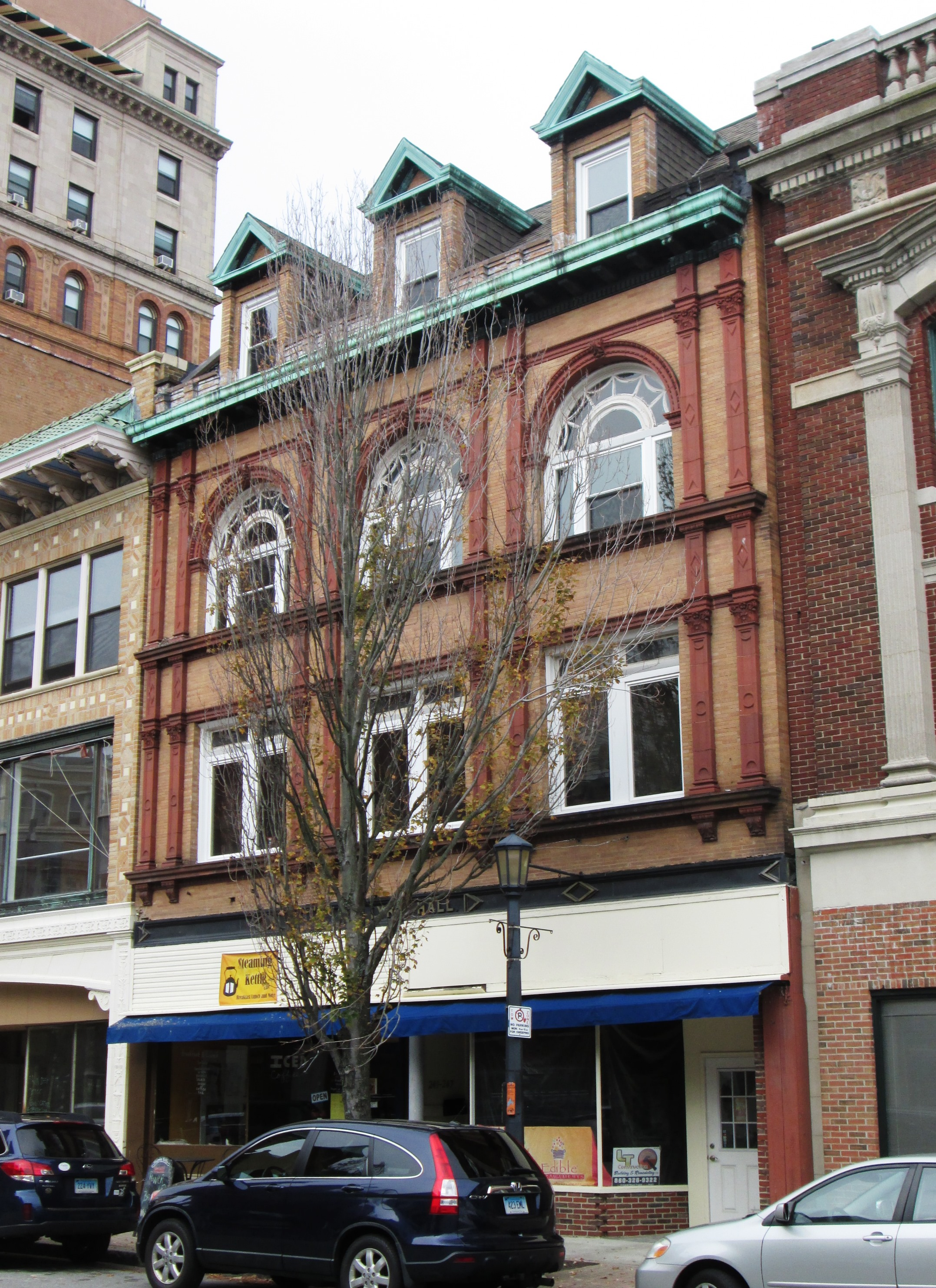
Lyric Hall, New London, Connecticut, 1897.

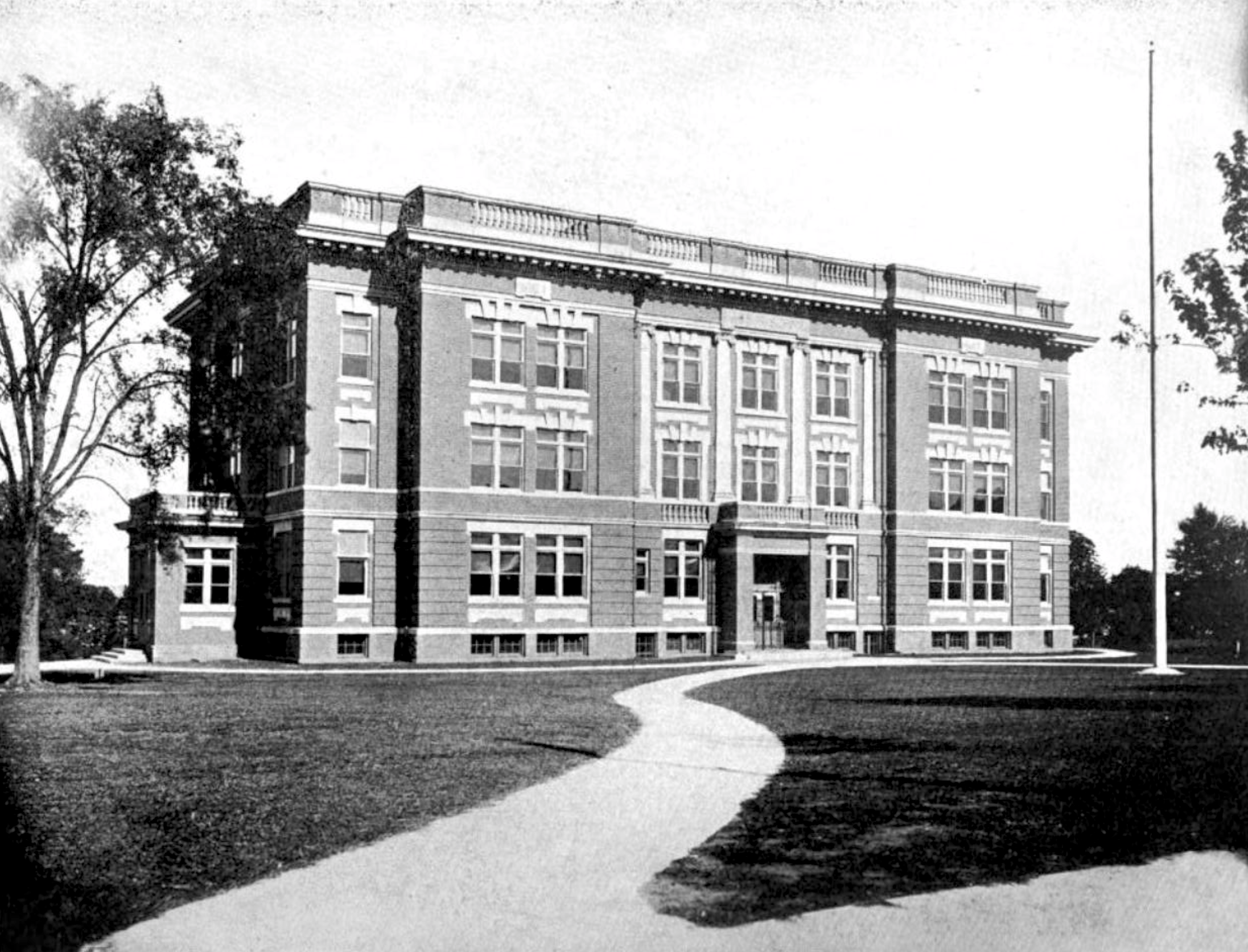
Harbor School, New London, Connecticut, 1907.

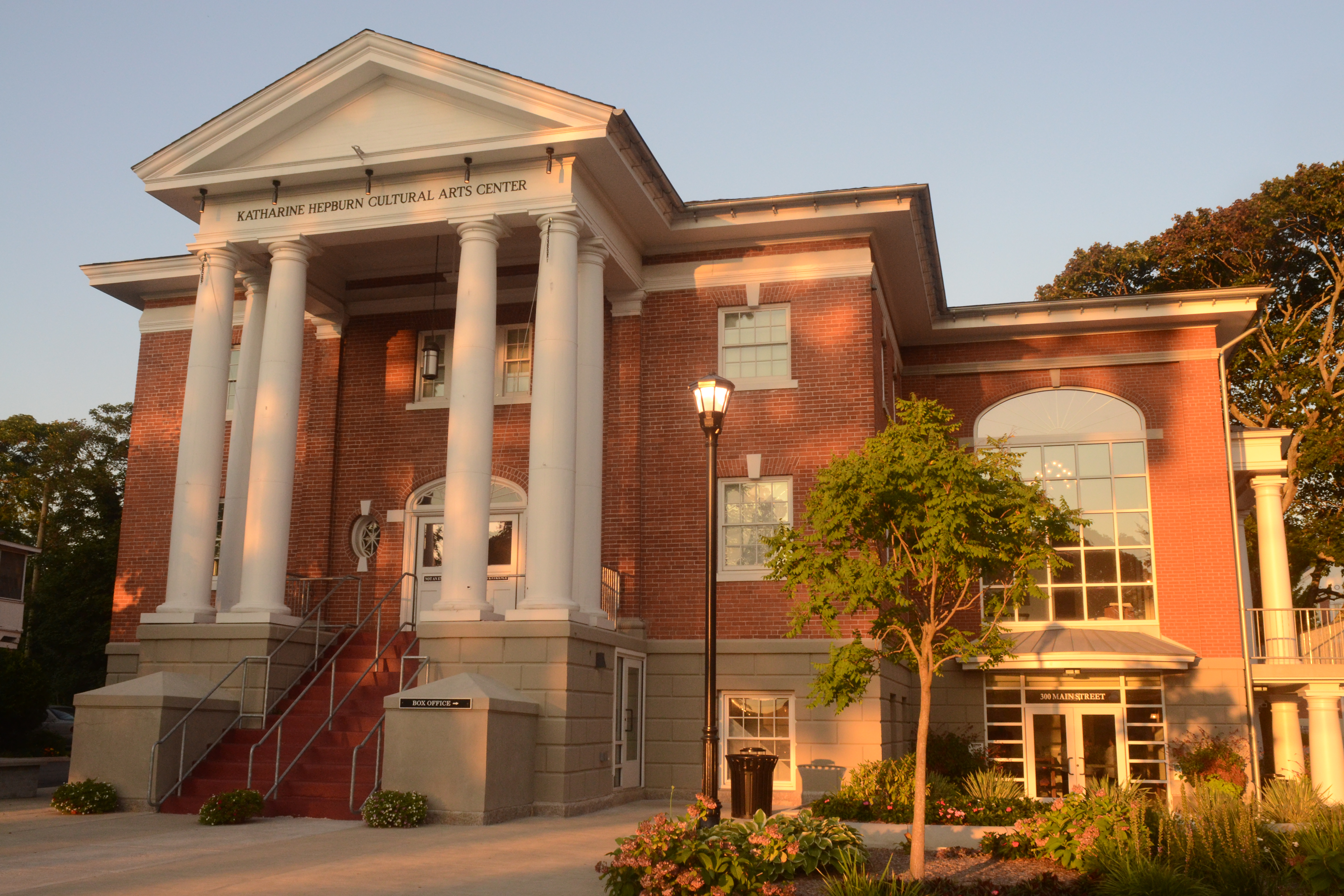
Old Saybrook Town Hall, Old Saybrook, Connecticut, 1910-11.

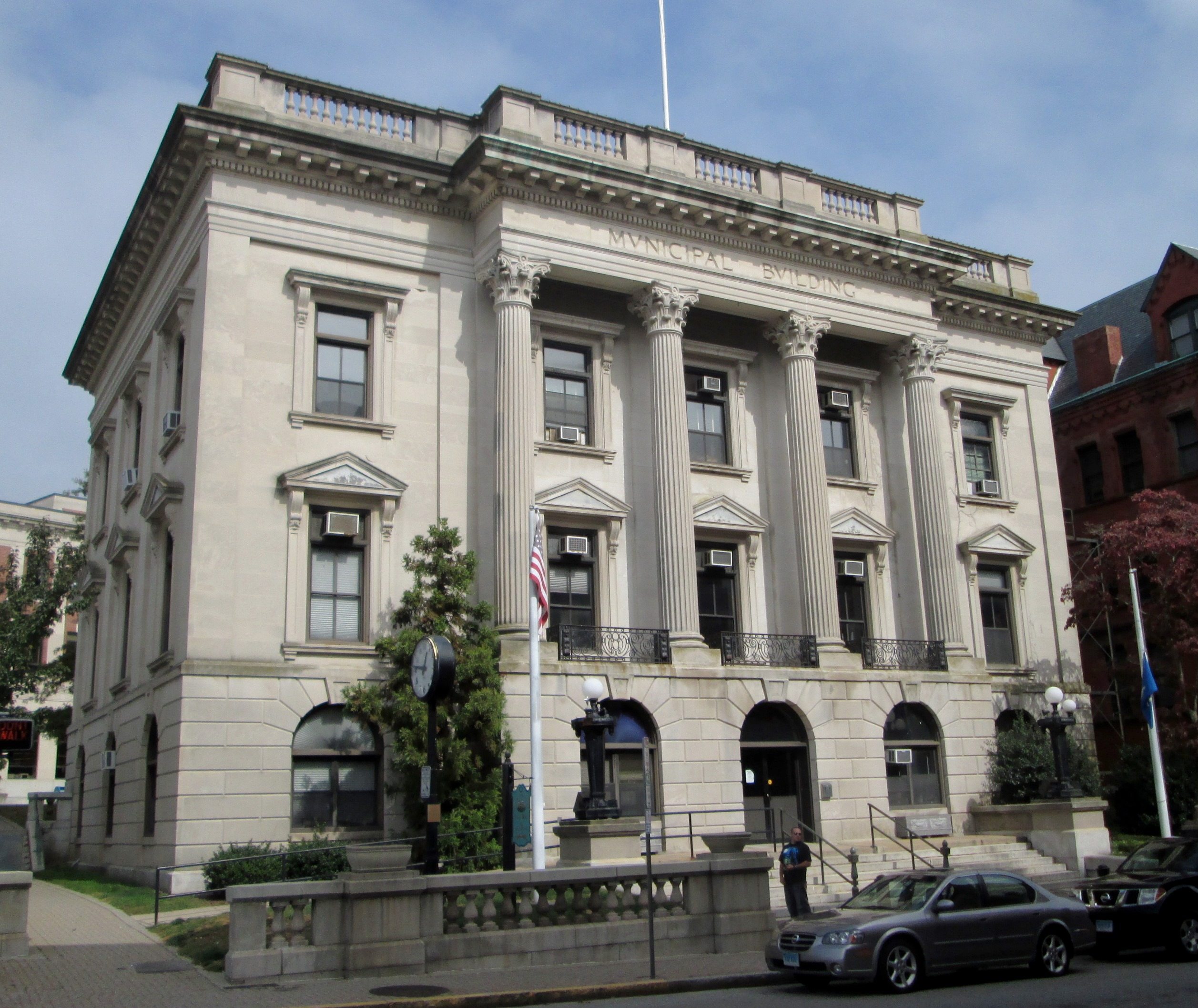
New London Municipal Building, New London, Connecticut, 1912.

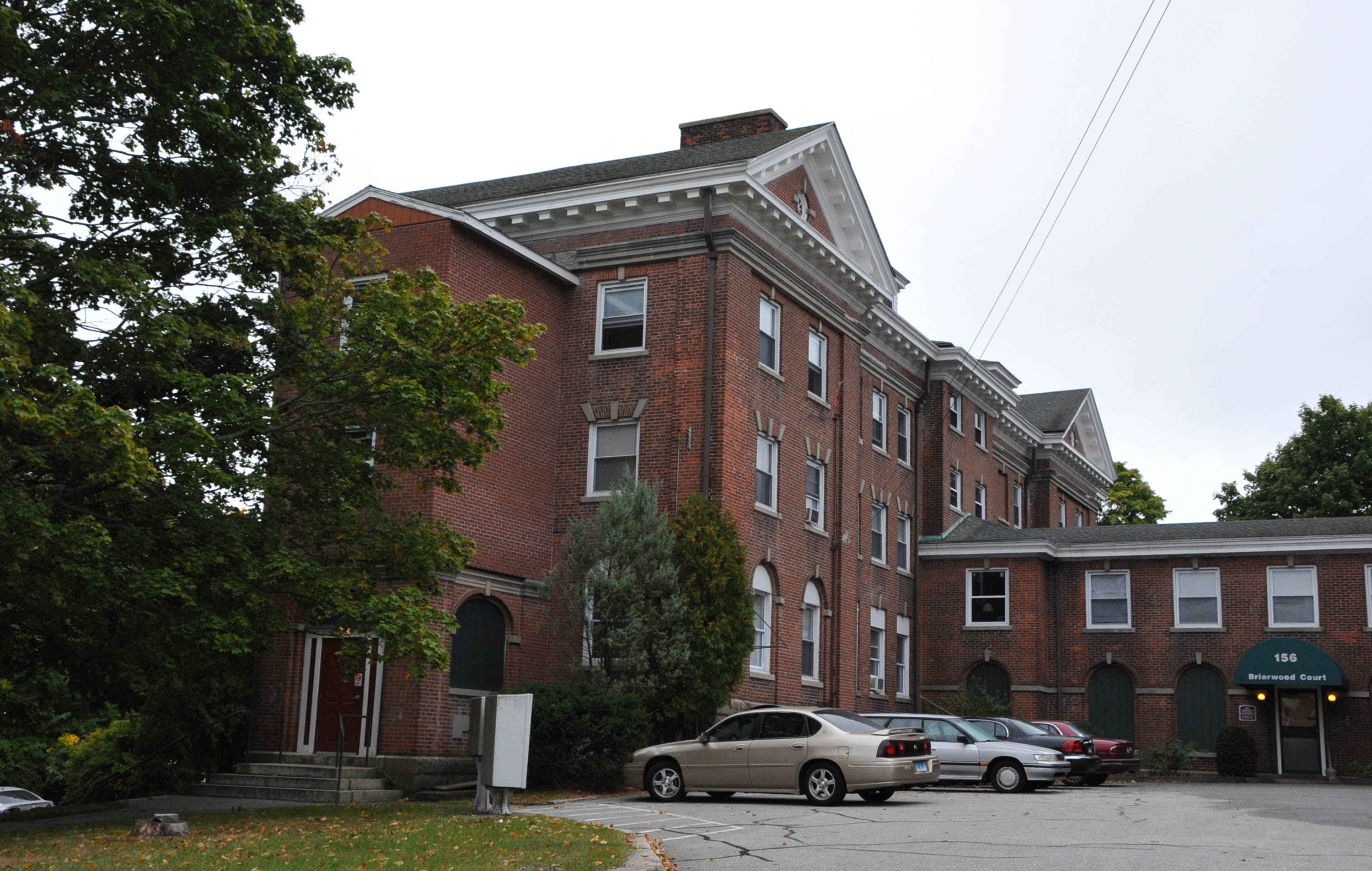
New London Almshouse, New London, Connecticut, 1916-17.
