= Alzada Comstock =

American economist (1888–1960)

Alzada Peckham Comstock
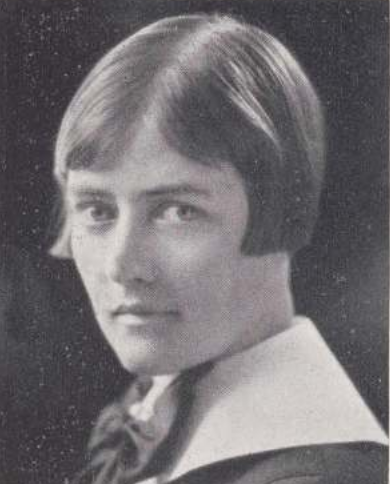
- Comstock, from the 1925 Mount Holyoke yearbook
- Born: November 23, 1888; Waterford, Connecticut, U.S.
- Died: January 15, 1960 (aged 71)

Academic background
- Education: Mount Holyoke College (BA); Columbia University (MA, PhD)
- Doctoral advisor: Edwin R. A. Seligman

Academic work
- Discipline: Economics
- Institutions: Mount Holyoke College
- Notable students: Ella Grasso

Alzada Peckham Comstock (November 23, 1888 – January 15, 1960) was an economist who taught at Mount Holyoke College. Her research focused on taxation, and between the world wars she frequently traveled to Europe to study the effect of different economic policies. She became a Guggenheim Fellow in 1926.

== Early life and education ==
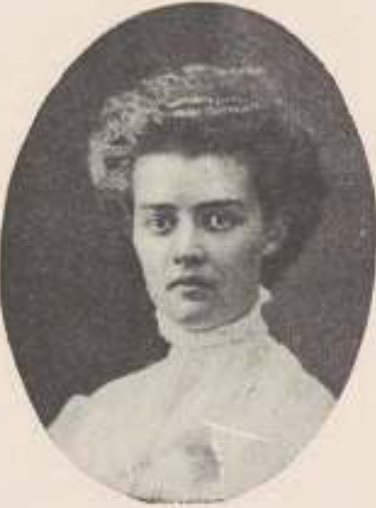
Alzada Comstock, from the 1910 Mount Holyoke College yearbook

Comstock was born in Waterford, Connecticut on November 23, 1888. Her father Leoline A. Comstock (b. 1852) was a coal dealer from Waterford, and her mother, named Lucy T., was from New London, Connecticut. She had two brothers, one named John. They attended the Baptist church in Quaker Hill, where her father was Superintendent.

Comstock attended the Uncasville School as a child, and graduated from The Williams School (where she was vice president of her class) in 1906. For part of her childhood, she lived at her aunt's house. She played basketball in high school and as an undergraduate. She earned a B.A. from Mount Holyoke College in 1910, followed by a research fellowship at the University of Chicago School of Civics and Philanthropy from 1911 to 1912. At Columbia University she completed a master's degree in 1913 and a Ph.D. in 1921, supervised by Edwin R. A. Seligman. She studied at the London School of Economics in 1919, and also studied at the Sorbonne.

== Career ==
Comstock became an instructor in economics and sociology at Mount Holyoke College in 1913. During the summers of 1914 and 1915, she was a statistical expert for the Massachusetts Minimum Wage Commission. She was promoted to the rank of associate professor at Mount Holyoke in 1917. She attended the first meetings of the League of Nations as an economic expert in 1920. Her first book, published in 1921, was State Taxation of Personal Incomes, based on her doctoral research. She taught for one year at Barnard College from 1921 to 1922.

In 1926, Comstock was awarded a Guggenheim Fellowship, with the stated purpose "to make a study of the League of Nations' financial reconstruction work in Hungary, with especial reference to taxation and the use of the international loan." This fellowship allowed her to study in Geneva and Budapest. In 1927, Comstock became a full professor at Mount Holyoke teaching economics. She served as chairman of the department of economics and sociology.

Comstock's research and writing focused on taxation, public finance in the U.S., and economic problems in the U.K. and Commonwealth. Throughout her career, Comstock wrote magazine articles for general audiences, in addition to her scholarly publications. She was a contributing editor to Current History for a decade, and contributed regularly to the World Book Encyclopedia and the New International Yearbook. She also published in American Economic Review, Journal of Political Economy, North American Review, and Barron's National Financial Weekly.

Her second book publication was a textbook, Taxation in the Modern State (1929), which was reviewed by the Journal of Political Economy, the Journal of the Royal Statistical Society, and The Economic Journal. The book analyzes the changes in taxation in the United States, Great Britain, Germany, France, and Italy after World War I. The reviews were lukewarm, generally observing that it had identified an important subject but not developed it in sufficient depth: in the words of one reviewer, "The accounts of these tax methods, in a part only of a small book, are necessarily very brief... and one does not find very much light on the question of how they are really made to work." However, the overall information was considered correct and useful, and it was recommended for use as a textbook "written in an unusually lucid and interesting style." One reviewer mistook Comstock for a man, mistakenly referring to "the author" as "he."

Comstock traveled frequently for research, saying, "I like to go where anything is stirring." In 1927, she was part of the first American trade union delegation to the Soviet Union. She contributed to the group's book-length report, Soviet Russia in the Second Decade. She returned to the Soviet Union for several successive summers, ultimately visiting five times. She was critical of the Soviet economy, publishing articles titled "The Specter of Russian Wheat", "The Daily Struggle in Soviet Russia", and "Pitfalls of the Soviet Plan". In 1933, she was in Germany for research when the Nazis took power. In 1945, she took a temporary leave from Mount Holyoke to work in public finance. That year, she attended and reported on the United Nations Conference on International Organization.

Comstock chaired the American Association of University Women (AAUW) committee on international relations for five years, from 1939 to 1944. She published two study-guides with AAUW in 1950 and 1952, titled "Aid to Europe: Achievements and Prospects" and "The United States and Foreign Assistance." These guides promoted the U.S. Marshall Plan to provide aid to Europe after World War II. She also served as vice president of the American Association of University Professors, and was a member of Phi Beta Kappa. She wrote play satirizing changes in college culture, titled "Milestones", which was performed twice by faculty at Mount Holyoke. She was a visiting professor at Smith College for two years between 1952 and 1954.

== Personal life ==
The archive of her papers held at Mount Holyoke contain letters written between 1915 and 1922, including some recording an "intense and affectionate relationship" with Helen Graves Fisk, a Mount Holyoke student.

By 1942, Comstock was living with her fellow economics professor Amy Hewes in one of the oldest buildings of South Hadley, Massachusetts. They knew each other as early as 1914, when both formed part of the Massachusetts Minimum Wage Commission. At Comstock's death, the Holyoke Transcript-Telegram reported that "A great and beautiful friendship-partnership ... has come to an end," naming Amy Hewes as the bereaved "other member of the partnership".

== Retirement and death ==
Comstock retired in June 1954. At this time, some of her former students from Mount Holyoke published a collection of essays as a festschrift for her, titled "Those Having Torches...": Economic Essays in Honor of Alzada Comstock. It included contributions from Janet Huntington Brewster and Ella Grasso. A reviewer praised the volume for being unusually cohesive and readable for a festschrift volume, attributing this to "the influence of the personality and teaching of Alzada Comstock." The economics research presented in the volume was on timely subjects, with historical rather than theoretical or deeply mathematical methodology, "presented with clarity and in language devoid of technical jargon," also reflecting Comstock's influence. The reviewer also reflected on the gender of the authors, concluding the review with the observation: "For those interested in women's education, the notes on the contributors and their experience are striking evidence of the opportunities open to women today, and are a record of which, as well as of their tribute to her, Miss Comstock may well be proud."

She returned to some part-time teaching in 1959 and 1960. Comstock died in 1960, aged 71, at the Cooley Dickinson Hospital in Northampton, Massachusetts.

== Selected publications ==
- State Taxation of Personal Incomes. 1921. Reprinted by AMS Press in 1969.
- "Financing a New Republic," The North American Review, Vol. 217, No. 807 (Feb., 1923), pp. 187–196.
- Taxation in the Modern State. Longmans, Green and Co., 1929.
- "Excises in Modern Times," The Annals of the American Academy of Political and Social Science, January 1, 1936.
- "India Rejects British Self-Rule Plan", Current History, Vol.2, No.9, May 1942, pp. 175–186
