= Smith Cove =

Smith Cove may refer to:

- Smith Cove (Connecticut), several coves
- Smith Cove (Seattle), Washington
- Smith Cove (South Shetland Islands)
