= Our Lady of Perpetual Help Parish (Quaker Hill, Connecticut) =

Coordinates: 41°23′39.2″N 72°06′33″W

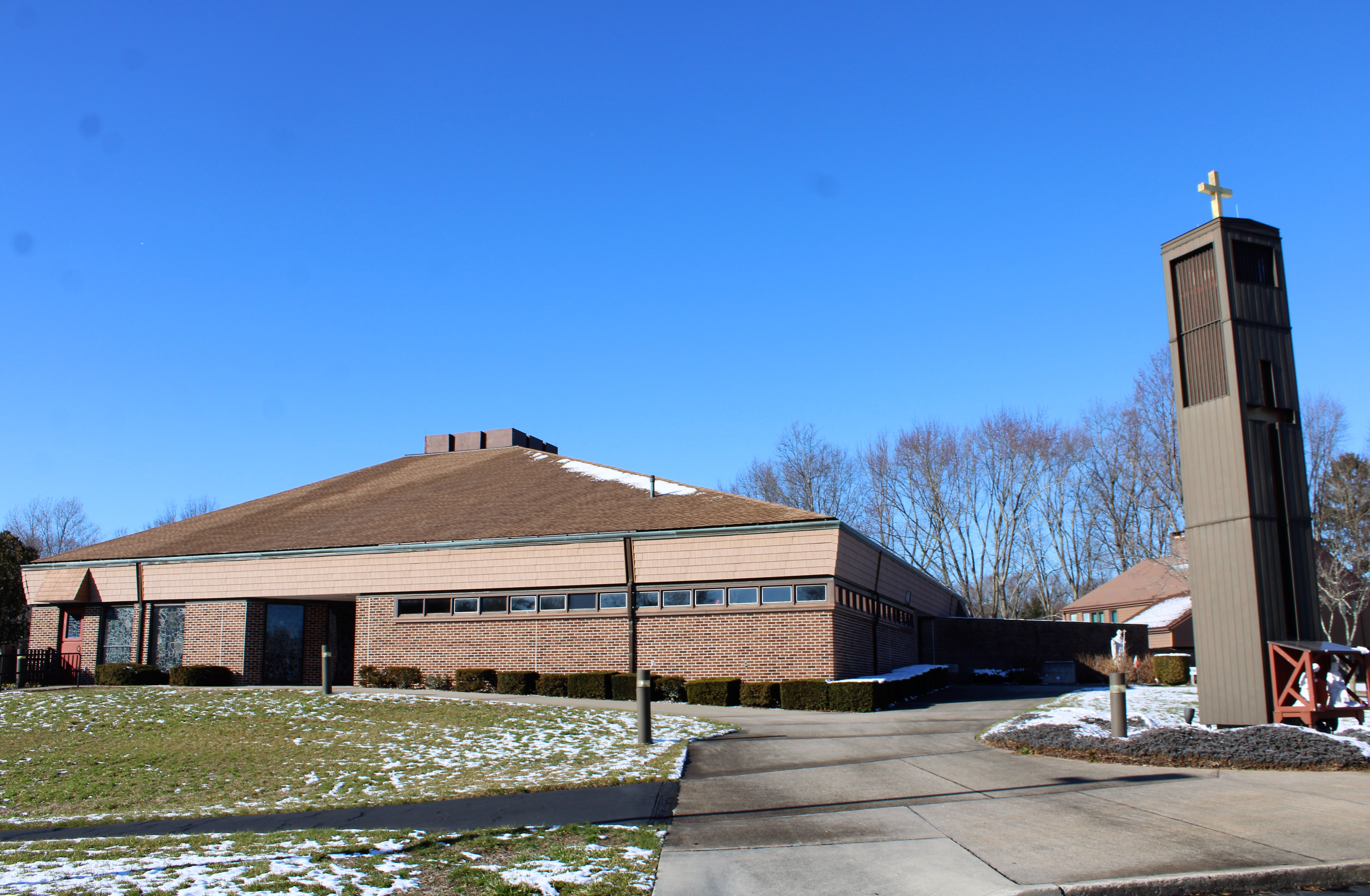
- Our Lady of Perpetual Help Parish
- Location: 63 Old Norwich Road; Quaker Hill, Connecticut
- Country: United States
- Denomination: Roman Catholic
- Website: Parish website

History
- Founded: 1904
- Founder: Polish immigrants
- Dedication: Our Lady of Perpetual Help

Administration
- Province: Hartford
- Diocese: Norwich

Clergy
- Bishop: Most Rev. Michael Richard Cote
- Pastor: Rev. Robert F. Buongirno

Our Lady of Perpetual Help Parish is a church designated for Polish immigrants in Quaker Hill, Connecticut, United States.

Founded in 1904, it is one of the Polish-American Roman Catholic parishes in New England in the Diocese of Norwich. Originally located in New London, the congregation built their first church on Huntington Street in that city in 1915, designed by New London architect James Sweeney. The building was designed in the Gothic Revival style. When planned expansion of Interstate 95 threatened the church building in the 1970s, the congregation moved to their current building in Quaker Hill in 1973.

== Bibliography ==
- Olson, James Stuart (1987). Catholic immigrants in America. St. Mary of Czestochowa Church.
- The 150th Anniversary of Polish-American Pastoral Ministry. Webster, Massachusetts: St. Joseph Basilica. September 11, 2005.
- Geller, Herbert F. Ethnic History Series: European Immigrants and the Catholic Church of Connecticut, 1870-1920. THE SUNDAY POST: Dolores Liptak.
- The Official Catholic Directory in USA
