= Katharine Hepburn Cultural Arts Center =

- Old Saybrook Town Hall and Theater
- U.S. National Register of Historic Places
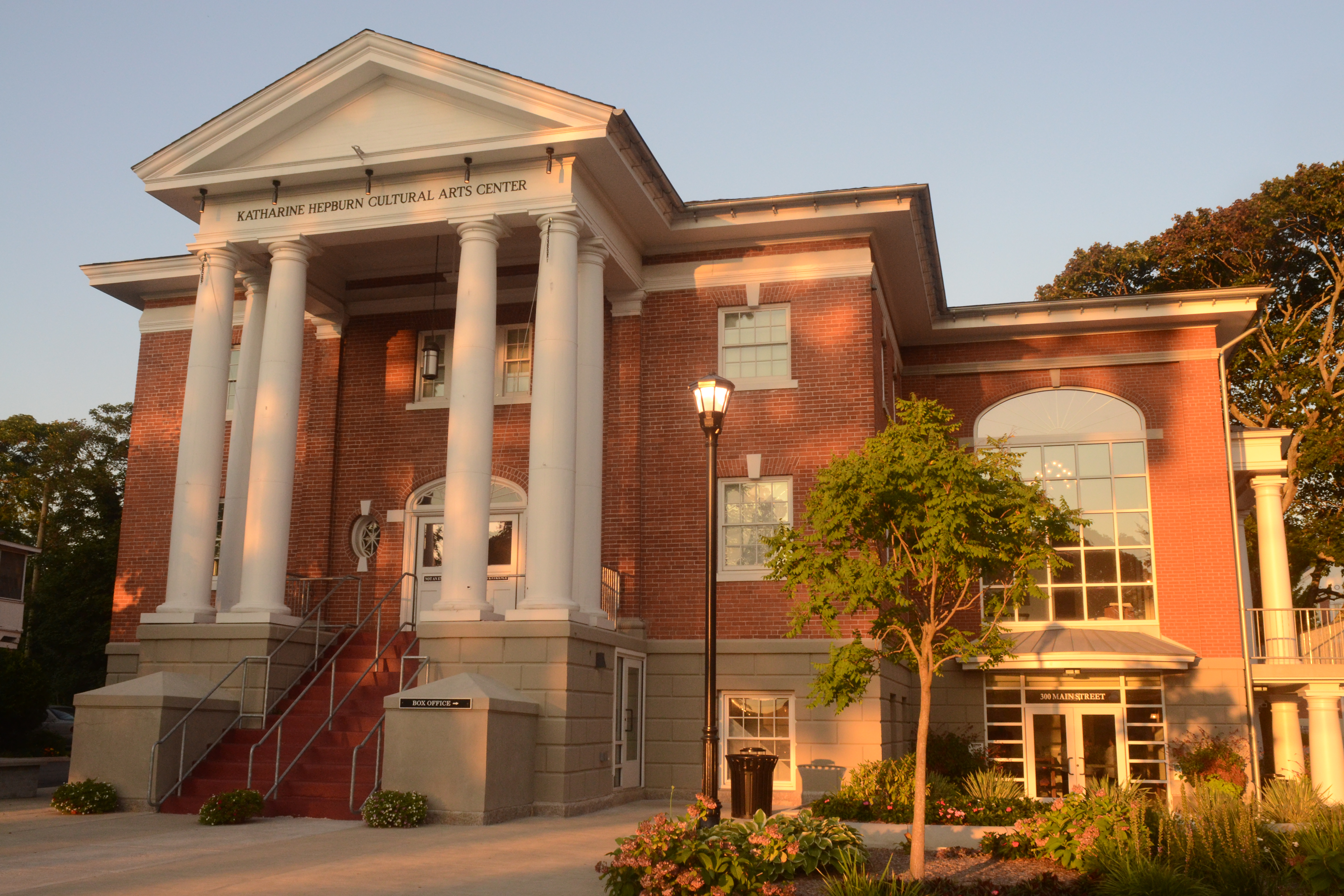
- The Katharine Hepburn Cultural Arts Center in 2011

- Location within Connecticut Location within the United States
- Location: 300 Main Street, Old Saybrook, Connecticut
- Coordinates: 41°17′26″N 72°23′11″W
- Area: 1 acre (0.40 ha)
- Built: 1910–11
- Built by: William L. Roe Jr.
- Architect: James Sweeney
- Architectural style: Colonial Revival
- NRHP reference No.: 07000558
- Added to NRHP: June 21, 2007

The Katharine Hepburn Cultural Arts Center, known as The Kate, is a performing arts center in Old Saybrook, Connecticut, that opened in 2009. It is named for Katharine Hepburn, the Academy Award-winning actress and lifelong resident of Old Saybrook.

The Kate is a non-profit performing arts organization located in a historic town hall and theater on Main Street in Old Saybrook which was opened in 1911 and was listed on the National Register of Historic Places in 2007. The Center has been renovated with public funds from the Town of Old Saybrook and donations raised by the Trustees of the Kate. It includes a 285-seat theater and the Katharine Hepburn Museum. The Kate presents more than 250 performances and events each year, including music, theater, comedy, film, simulcasts of the Metropolitan Opera, and dance; it also hosts arts education programs for children and youth.

The Katharine Hepburn Museum presents many photographs from Katharine Hepburn’s life and career. It also features her 1975 Primetime Emmy Award, examples of letters written to her family during the early years of her career, costume and personal wardrobe pieces, and two of her paintings, including a self-portrait.

The building was designed by New London architect James Sweeney, "a fine example of the Colonial Revival Style." The general contractor was William L. Roe Jr., also of New London.

== See also ==
- National Register of Historic Places listings in Middlesex County, Connecticut
