= Susan DiBona =

American composer

Susan DiBona (born 18 February 1974) is an American-Italian film and television composer.

On February 18, 1974, DiBona was born in New Haven, Connecticut and resided in Clinton, Connecticut. DiBona is fluent in eight languages. DiBona has performed in Europe. DiBona attended The Williams School. DiBona has studied at Barnard College and Columbia University.

DiBona currently lives in Praia a Mare, Italy.
