= Quaker Hill, Connecticut =

Village in Connecticut, United States

Coordinates: 41°24′12″N 72°06′21″W

Quaker Hill is a village or neighborhood in the town of Waterford, in the southeastern part of Connecticut, United States.

It is located in the northeastern corner of the town, on the west bank of the Thames River (around Smith Cove) north of New London, and centered on the intersection of the Old Norwich Road and the Old Colchester Road.

The village center is included in the Quaker Hill Historic District, a historic district that is listed on the National Register of Historic Places. The historic district is the area around Old Norwich Road, extending as far south as the village of Thames View and as far north as Route 32.

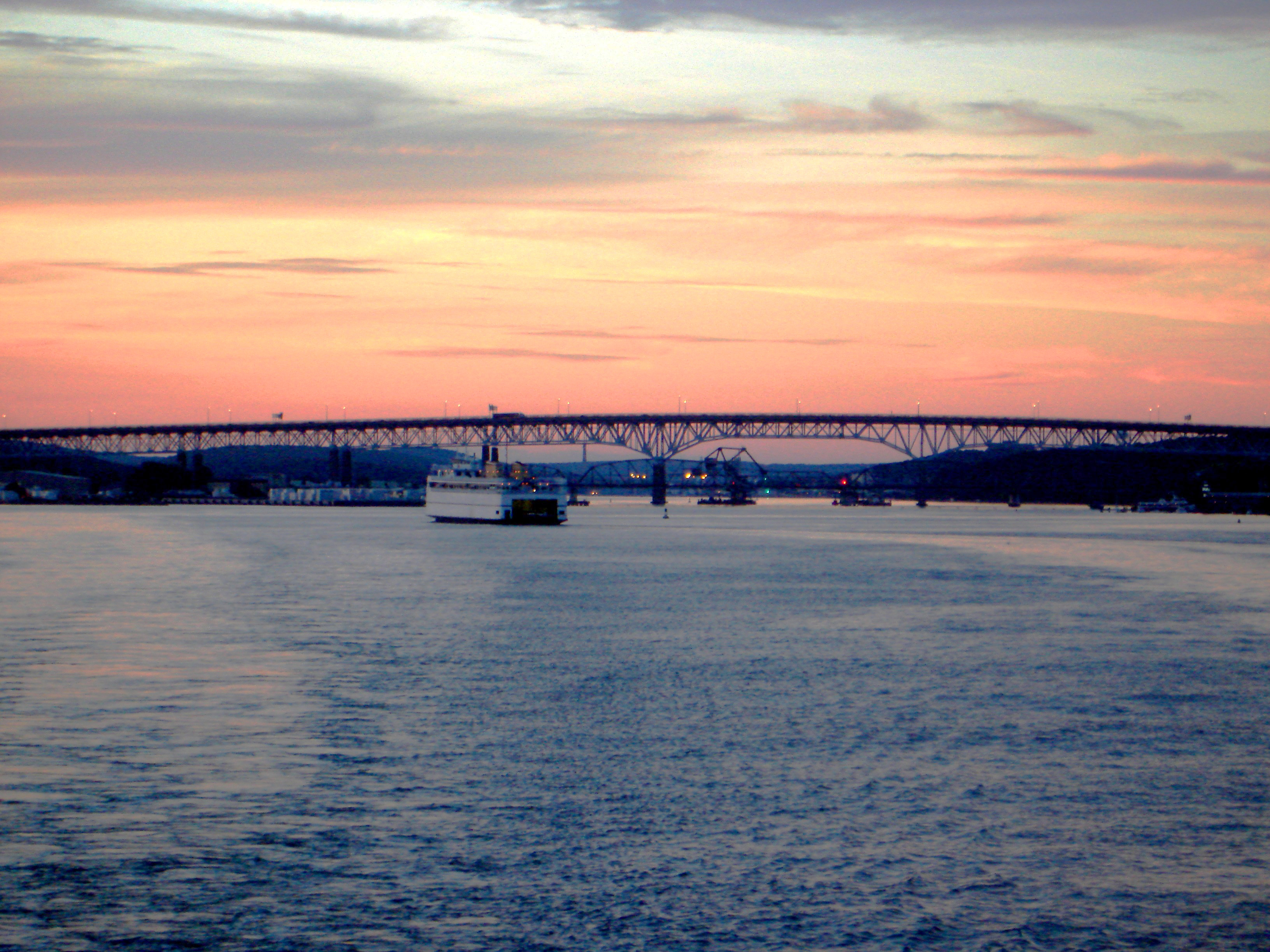
View of Quaker Hill to the left after the Gold Star Memorial Bridge

Quaker Hill is the place name used for ZIP code 06375, which extends beyond Quaker Hill to encompass the entire northeastern portion of the town of Waterford, including Bartlett, Best View, Cohanzie, Harrisons and Thames View.

== History ==
The area became known as Quaker Hill by 1687 due to its association with the Rogerenes or Rogerene Quakers, a religious sect founded by a local farmer, John Rogers (1648–1721) at the house near Benham Avenue.

The first house was built circa 1740 by Benjamin Greene at Scotch Cap. The Robertson and Bingham paper mill, established in 1851, is said to be the first manufacturer of real tissue manila in the United States.

== Education ==
=== Quaker Hill School ===
Waterford Public Schools operates one elementary school in Quaker Hill. The original Quaker Hill School was built in 1915, replacing two one- room district structures and was opened in 1917, and demolished on February 23, 2007, to make way for construction of a new Quaker Hill Elementary School that was scheduled to open in August 2008. This school is now located on 285 Bloomingdale Road, Quaker Hill CT.

=== Waterford Country School ===
Waterford Country School is a private nonprofit human services agency in Quaker Hill that offers a variety of special educational, residential treatment, and care services for children ages 10–18 from throughout eastern Connecticut. It was established in 1922 and moved to its current 350-acre (1.4 km^{2}) site in Quaker Hill in 1929.

== Notable person ==
- Eugene P. Wilkinson, Captain of the USS Nautilus, the world's first nuclear submarine, lived in Quaker Hill during the 1950s

== Fire and EMS service ==
The Quaker Hill Fire Company serves the residents of Quaker hill. The Fire house is located on Old Colchester Road.

== See also ==
- Connecticut College Arboretum
- New London, Connecticut
- Waterford, Connecticut
