= Amy Hewes =

American economist (1877–1970)

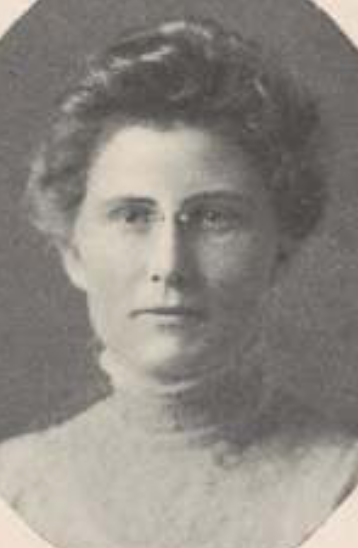
- Amy Hewes, from the 1910 Mount Holyoke College yearbook
- Born: September 8, 1877; Baltimore, Maryland, U.S.
- Died: March 25, 1970 (aged 92); Ossining, New York, U.S.
- Occupations: Economist; college professor
- Known for: taught at Mount Holyoke College from 1905 to 1943

Amy Hewes (September 8, 1877 – March 25, 1970) was an American economist, "a pioneer in introducing the minimum wage to the United States", who taught at Mount Holyoke College from 1905 to 1943.

== Early life and education ==
Amy Hewes was born in Baltimore, Maryland, the daughter of Edwin Hewes and Martha G. Hewes. Her birth was registered with the Baltimore Monthly Meeting of Friends. She earned a bachelor's degree at Goucher College in 1897. She earned a master's degree at the University of Berlin in 1900, and completed doctoral studies in sociology at the University of Chicago in 1903, with a dissertation titled "The Part of Invention in the Social Process." Along with the Wisconsin school, the Chicago School of sociology is very influential in the academic history of disciplinary sociology and between 1892 and 1920 Hewes was the only woman student awarded a fellowship in the sociology department However, Albion W. Small, department chair in sociology at Chicago, would recommend her not for a position in sociology or cognate disciplines but as a language instructor of German: "political science--civics, constitutional and diplomatic history, elementary economics and sociology--or something within hailing distance of these I should not hesitate--but German is a sight too wide of the mark", she wrote to Small, clarifying her choice to decline this job in a letter.

== Career ==
Hewes taught at Mount Holyoke College from 1905 to 1943; she was promoted to the rank of professor in 1909. Among her students at Mount Holyoke were Ella Grasso, governor of Connecticut, who considered Hewes a mentor. She also taught at the Bryn Mawr Summer School for Women Workers. From 1943 to 1947, she was visiting professor at Sarah Lawrence College, University of Massachusetts, and Rockford College. She also gave lectures on labor topics for community audiences.

Hewes served as executive secretary of the Massachusetts Minimum Wage Commission from 1913 to 1915. She also worked on national and international committees concerning minimum wage and wartime labor shortages. She testified at a Senate hearing on labor education extension programs in 1948. She received an award from the United States Department of Labor in 1962, "for furthering the lot of laborers throughout the U.S."

Books by Hewes include Industrial Home Work (1915), Women as Munition Makers: A Study of Conditions in Bridgeport, Connecticut (1917), and The Contribution of Economics to Social Work (1930). For the United States Women's Bureau, she authored the study, Women Workers in the Third Year of the Depression (1933). She also directed a published student study, Women Workers and Family Support (1925). In addition to five books, she wrote over forty publications in major academic journals including American Economic Review, Journal of Political Economy, Monthly Labor Review, Social Service Review, American Journal of Sociology, and Current History.

== Personal life ==
Hewes lived with other Mount Holyoke faculty in South Hadley, Massachusetts, including fellow economist Alzada Comstock. At Comstock's death in 1960, the Holyoke Transcript-Telegram reported that "A great and beautiful friendship-partnership ... has come to an end," naming Hewes as the bereaved "other member of the partnership". Hewes died in 1970, aged 92 years, at a nursing home in Ossining, New York.
