= Civic Institutions Historic District =

Historic district in Connecticut

- U.S. National Register of Historic Places
- U.S. Historic district
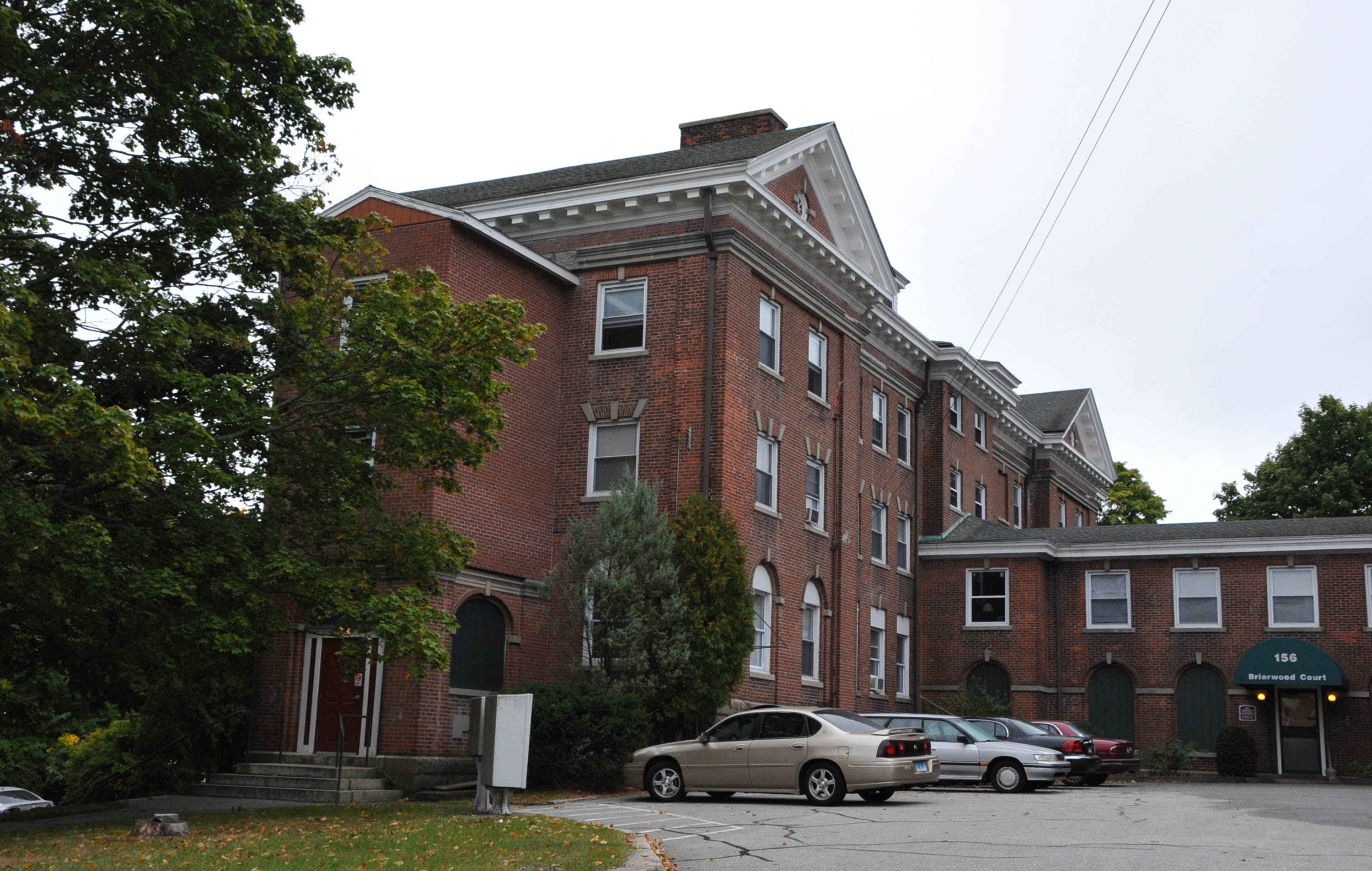

- Location within Connecticut Location within the United States
- Location: 156-158, 171, 173-175 Garfield Avenue, 179 Colman Street, 32 Walden Avenue, New London, Connecticut
- Coordinates: 41°21′15″N 72°6′42″W
- Area: 7 acres (2.8 ha)
- Built: 1867
- Architect: Donald Grant Mitchell Jr. (1912-14); James Sweeney (1916-17)
- Architectural style: Colonial Revival, Queen Anne, Georgian Revival
- NRHP reference No.: 90000602
- Added to NRHP: April 16, 1990

The Civic Institutions Historic District in New London, Connecticut, is a historic district that was listed on the National Register of Historic Places in 1990. It includes six contributing buildings over a 7 acres (2.8 ha) area. The district includes properties that were historically developed between 1867 and 1917 to provide for the city's indigent population and to provide medical services to the community at large. Two of the buildings are almshouses built in 1867 and 1917, and the others were historically associated with the delivery of medical services and date to the turn of the 20th century. The district properties are 179 Colman Street, 32 Walden Avenue, and 156, 158, 171, and 173-5 Garfield Avenue.

== Description and history ==
The Civic Institutions Historic District is located on the western fringe of the developed core of New London. It is roughly bisected by Garfield Avenue, near its western end at Colman Avenue. The district contains the buildings of three city-owned institutions, including the New London Almshouse, Memorial Hospital, and the Mitchell Isolation Hospital.

The former almshouse stands on the south side of Garfield Avenue, a brick building with two wings joined by a central hyphen. The earlier section was built around 1867, a masonry building in the Italianate style. Construction was in part funded with a donation from businessman and former mayor Jonathan Newton Harris. The building was doubled in size 50 years later when a new main building was built in front of the older building, designed by New London architect James Sweeney. This was a much more elaborate building, designed in the Colonial Revival style. This construction was funded by a bequest from Sebastian Duffy Lawrence, who had died in 1909. The institution was closed in the early 1970s and sold in 1974. It is now a condominium building known as Briarwood Court.

The original Memorial Hospital building built in 1892 stands on the north side of Garfield Avenue, closer to Colman. A detached hospital building stands behind the hospital, built as a dormitory for nurses in 1901. Its construction was funded by Harris. The main buildings are in the Queen Anne style, while the later dormitory for nurses is Colonial Revival. Memorial Hospital operated at this location until 1918, when it was merged with Lawrence Hospital, now Lawrence + Memorial Hospital. The original hospital buildings were later converted for residential use.

The Mitchell Isolation Hospital faces Colman Street, a single-story Colonial Revival structure completed in 1914. It was used as a facility for segregating patients with highly infectious diseases, including smallpox and tuberculosis. Like the other buildings in the district, its construction was funded through a philanthropic bequest, this time from Annie Olivia Mitchell, a daughter of Charles Lewis Tiffany who had married into a wealthy local family. Mitchell's nephew Donald Grant Mitchell Jr. supervised construction. It was built as part of Memorial Hospital, but it became a separate institution in 1920 after Memorial and Lawrence Hospitals were merged; it ultimately closed in 1953. The design was based on the isolation building of the former Providence City Hospital, designed by Providence architects Martin & Hall and completed in 1911. This building is now Hunt-Cavanaugh Hall of Providence College.

These buildings represent the city's response to the need to provide for its indigent and sick populations in the late 19th century. They are well-preserved specimens of institutional versions of the Queen Anne and Colonial Revival styles popular at the time.

The exteriors of the buildings have been little changed since the district was created. The significant alterations were to the almshouse buildings, where wooden brackets were removed from the 1867 building, and the removal of a two-story Ionic portico from the 1917 building.

== See also ==
- National Register of Historic Places listings in New London County, Connecticut
