= The Williams School =

School in New London, Connecticut, US

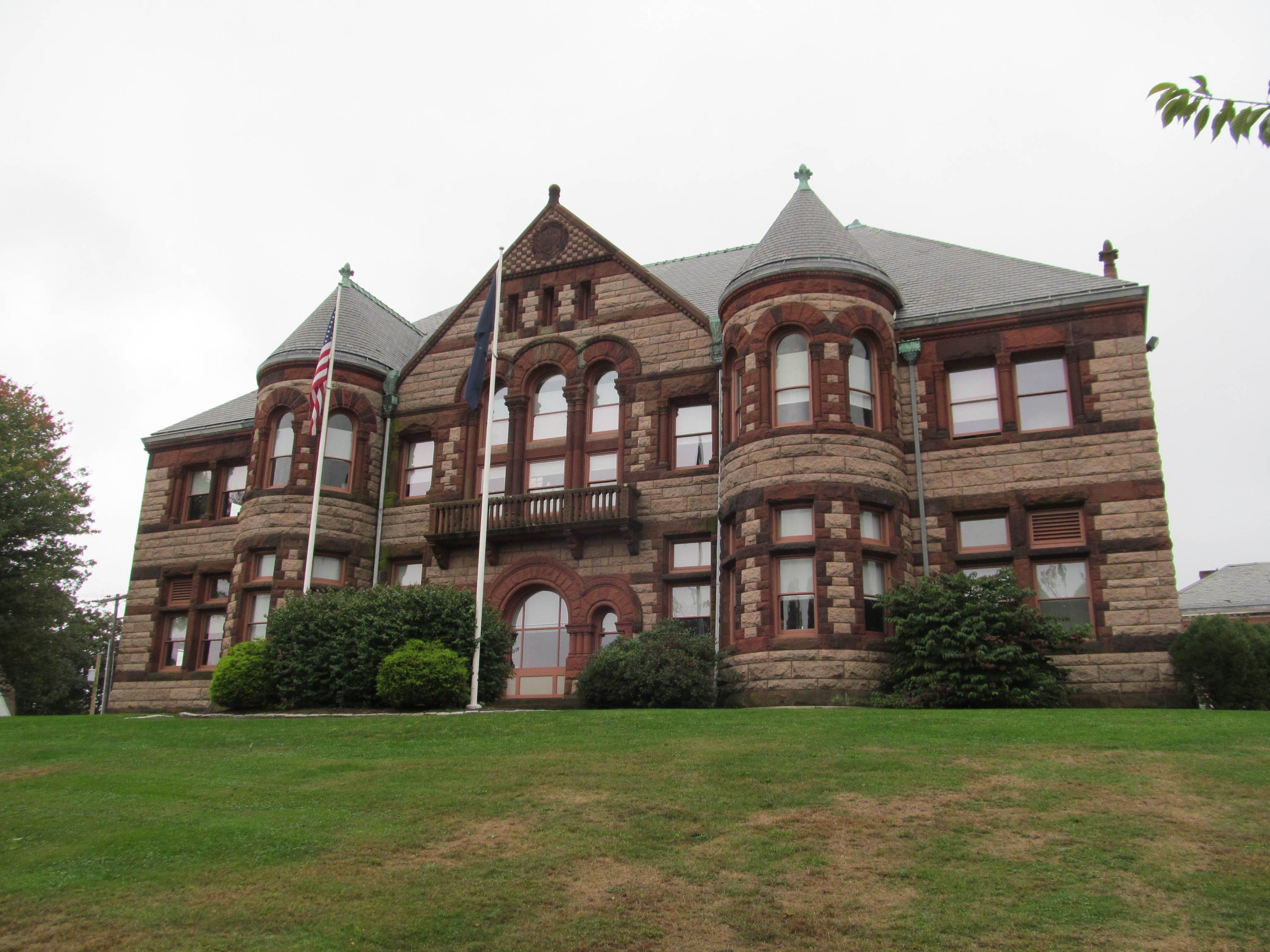
- The former Williams Memorial Institute building at 110 Broad Street

Location
- 182 Mohegan Avenue; New London, Connecticut 06320; United States; 41°22′35″N 72°06′14″W

Information
- Former name: The Williams Memorial Institute
- School type: Private
- Established: 1891 (135 years ago)
- Founder: Harriet Peck Williams
- Head of school: Mark Fader
- Grades: 6-12
- Enrollment: 236
- Colors: Blue and white
- Mascot: The Blues
- Website: www.williamsschool.org
- Williams Memorial Institute
- U.S. National Register of Historic Places
- Location: 110 Broad Street
- Built: 1891
- Architect: Shepley, Rutan & Coolidge
- Architectural style: Richardsonian Romanesque
- NRHP reference No.: 78002876
- Added to NRHP: January 30, 1978

The Williams School is a private co-educational secondary school in New London, Connecticut, that offers classes from 6th grade to 12th grade. It was founded as the Williams Memorial Institute (WMI) by Harriet Peck Williams in 1891, following the death of her son Thomas W. Williams II, a well-known whaling merchant.

The school was originally located at 110 Broad Street in New London, but moved when it merged with Connecticut College in 1954. Despite the merger, it remains a legally separate entity. The original building became a Connecticut state courthouse in 1972, and was purchased by the state in 1997.

== History ==
=== Location and facilities ===
The school's first building was located at 110 Broad Street between Hempstead and Williams Streets. It was built in 1889–91 and was designed by Shepley, Rutan & Coolidge – the successor firm to H. H. Richardson – in the Richardsonian Romanesque style, which is featured in several other buildings in New London. The school was able to accommodate three hundred students and had seven classrooms, a gymnasium, laboratories, and a library. The WMI building was listed on the National Register of Historic Places in 1978 for its architecture, and since 1972 has housed the State of Connecticut Superior Court for Geographical Area 10. The state bought the building in 1997.

=== First president ===
Colin Sherman Buell was the first president of The Williams Memorial Institute. He was a key figure in improving higher education for women. Buell tried to expand the Memorial Institute to become a women's college, but the plan fell through due to lack of interest. When Wesleyan College in Middletown decided to stop admitting women to the university, Buell combined efforts with Elizabeth Wright. With $135,000 from the City of New London $1 million from Morton F. Plant. they helped found Connecticut College. He later became a member of the college's board of trustees.

=== High school for girls ===
WMI was the high school for girls in New London and other surrounding towns until New London High School opened in 1951.

== Merger with Connecticut College ==
=== Agreement ===
On February 18, 1954, the Williams Memorial Institute started discussions to relocate the school near the Connecticut College campus on Mohegan Avenue. The relocation cost $200,000 and stipulated that the college approve all the terms of the junction. The terms of the agreement were bonded by a ten-year contract, set to be renewed every five years after the completion of the initial ten years.

=== Location ===
The current Williams School building is located in the south portion of the Connecticut College near Palmer Auditorium. The architects responsible for the design are Shreve, Lamb, and Harmon, who designed buildings for Connecticut College The building was expanded on November 24, 1964, to be able to accommodate more students. Although the school changed its name to The Williams School, its legal name remains The Williams Memorial Institute.

=== Structure ===
Williams added a middle school (grades 7 and 8) in 1955, and became co-educational in 1971.

=== Connecticut College ===
Through the relationship between the two schools, Connecticut College education majors are able to student teach at the Williams School, while the college provides funding to the Williams School. This relationship was one of the first ones between a college and a secondary or elementary school. The college and the school are separate entities that mutually benefit each other. The college has no power over educational curriculum and extracurricular activities of the school.

=== Associations ===
- Accredited by the New England Association of Schools and Colleges (NEASC)
- Member of the National Association of Independent Schools (NAIS)
- Member of the Connecticut Association of Independent Schools (CAIS)
- Member of the Eastern Connecticut Chamber of Commerce and the Greater Mystic Chamber of Commerce

== Presidents ==
- 1891–1938: Colin Sherman Buell
- 1938–1946: Jerome Burett
- 1946–1956: Gertrude Moon
- 1950–1960: Evelyn Page
- 1960–1963: Catherine Oakes
- 1963–1978: Marion H. Hamilton
- 1978–1994: Steven J. Danenberg
- 1994–1998: Lawrence Roberts
- 1998–2008: Charlotte L. Rhea
- 2008–present: Mark Fader

== Notable alumni ==
- Valerie Azlynn - actress
- Noah Bean - actor
- Alzada Comstock - professor of economics at Mount Holyoke College
- Susan DiBona - film composer
- Grace L. Drake - Ohio state legislator
- Jesse Metcalfe - actor
- Ann Haven Morgan - professor of biology at Mount Holyoke College
- Clancy Philbrick - artist
- Stephen Trask - composer
- Cassie Ventura - model and singer
