= Quaker Hill Historic District (Waterford, Connecticut) =

Historic district in Connecticut, United States

- U.S. National Register of Historic Places
- U.S. Historic district
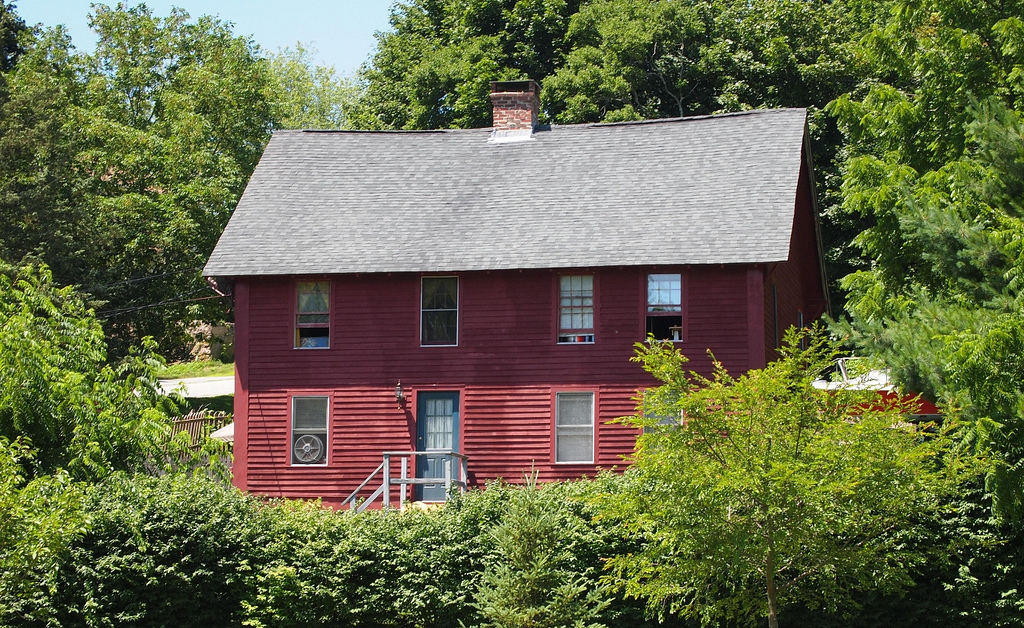
- Red Lion Tavern (1824) in 2011

- Location within Connecticut Location within the United States
- Location: Roughly along Old Norwich Road from Richards Grove Road to Mohegan Avenue Parkway, Waterford, Connecticut
- Coordinates: 41°24′12″N 72°6′35″W
- Area: 102 acres (41 ha)
- Architectural style: Colonial Revival, et al.
- NRHP reference No.: 02000337
- Added to NRHP: April 11, 2002

The Quaker Hill Historic District encompasses the center a mainly residential village in northeastern Waterford, Connecticut. Running in a mostly linear fashion along Old Norwich Road between Connecticut Route 32 and Richard Grove Road, the area first grew as a settlement of religious non-conformists in the 17th century, developed in the 19th century as a small industrial village, and became more suburban in character in the 20th century. Its architecture is reflective of these changes, and it was listed on the National Register of Historic Places in 2002.

== Description and history ==
Waterford's Quaker Hill area was part of early land divisions when New London was settled by English Colonists in the mid-17th century. Much of the land in the area was acquired by James Rogers, whose family eventually split from the local Congregationalist church to form a sect (called "Rogerenes" after their leader) that borrowed from both Baptist and Quaker theology. The Rogerenes refused to accept colonial authority or pay ministerial taxes, and the village they formed developed without the traditional central meeting house. In 1792, Old Norwich Road was built through the area as a turnpike, joining New London and Norwich. Only a few buildings survive in the village prior to its construction, including the only stone house, built in 1794 for Christopher Green. In the 19th century, the village flourished as a local center of the papermaking industry, and it developed as a streetcar suburb when a trolley line was run along Old Norwich Road from New London.

The district is a very irregularly shaped district that generally runs along Old Norwich Road. It includes the center of the historic Quaker Hill neighborhood. It excludes non-historic properties, including entire streets, of modern-day Quaker Hill. It has 109 elements, of which 92 are contributing buildings, over a 102 acres (41 ha) area. It also includes 16 non-contributing buildings and one non-contributing site. Most of the buildings are residential, reflecting a diversity of architectural styles across the 19th and early 20th centuries. Properties included in the district are: numbers 3 and 5 on Caroline Court; 3 Northwood Road; 2, 11, and 17 on Quaker Hill Green (Old Colchester Road); 2 Richard's Grove Road; 6, 8, 9, 10, 12, and 15 Rosemary Lane; and 54 parcels on Old Norwich Road ranging from numbers 91 to 209.

== Contributing properties ==
Contributing properties in the district include:

- the Christopher Green House, a Georgian style house dating from 1794, is the only stone building in the district.
- the Benjamin Green house is a Colonial style house.
- the John Rogers House, perhaps from 1782
- Quaker Hill Baptist Church
- Red Lion Tavern
- Alexander House
- Glassbrenner House, c. 1900, a Queen Anne/Colonial Revival 188 Old Norwich Road
- Quaker Hill School, a large brick building with two-story pilasters
- Quaker Hill Firehouse, from 1927
- Ester Blum House, c. 1920, a four-square at 93 Old Norwich Road
- John Burch House, c. 1800, 95 Old Norwich Road
- James Moore House, c. 1860, a Gothic Revival cottage at 97 Old Norwich Road
- Greystone Heights, c. 1919 a stuccoed Craftsman influenced home at 3 Northwood Road
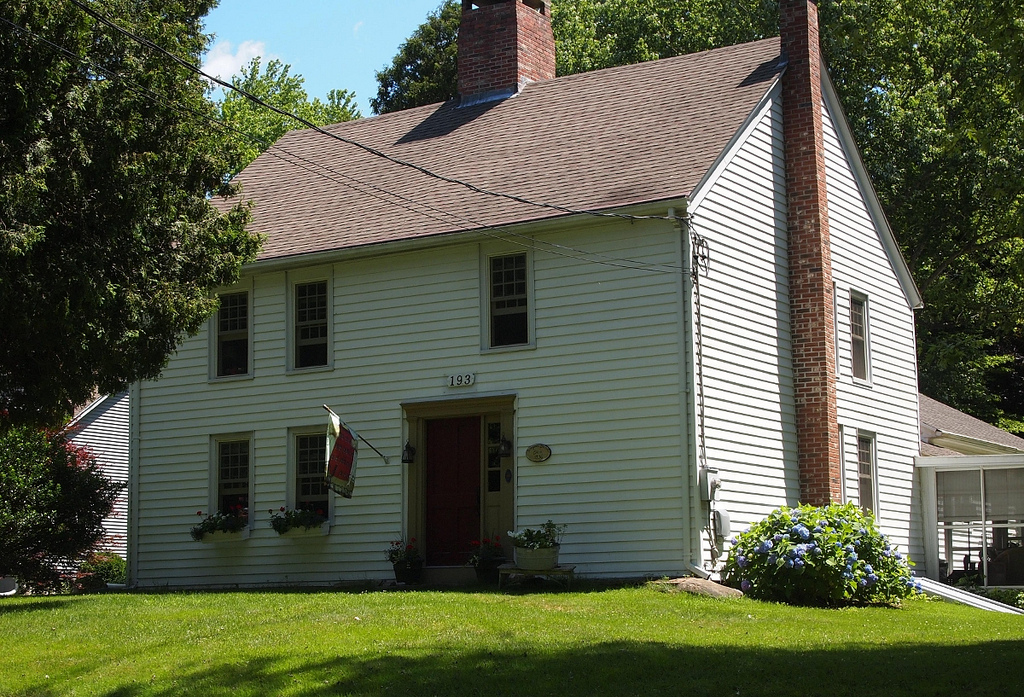
Benjamin Green House (1736 or 1800)

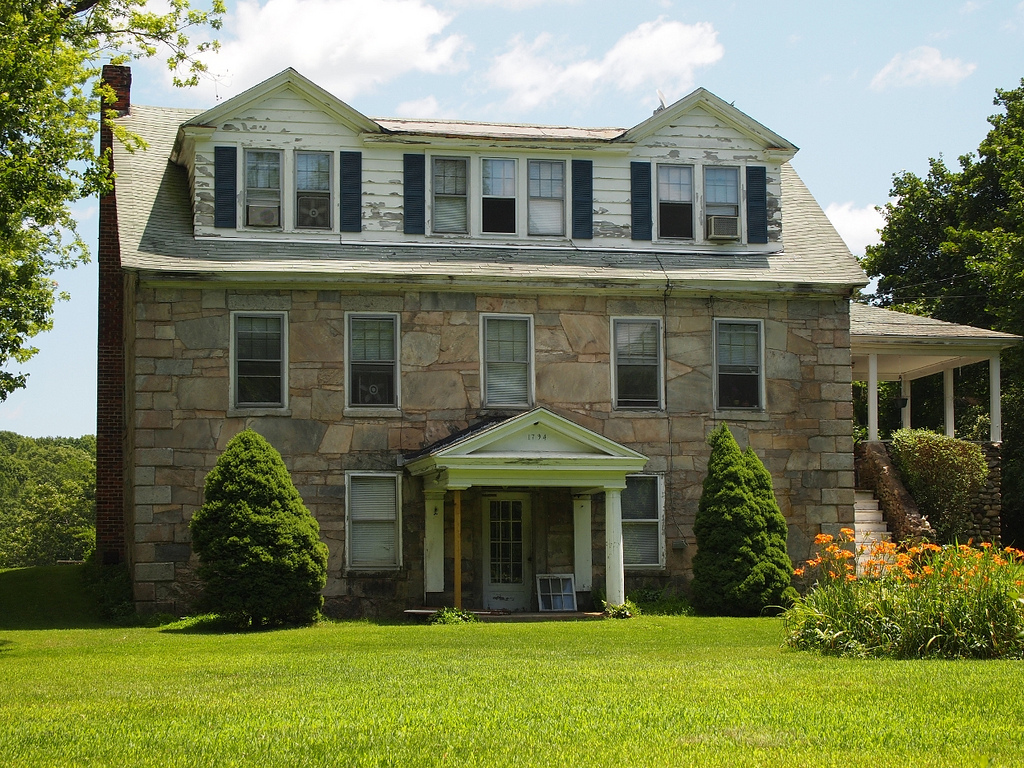
Christopher Green House (1794)

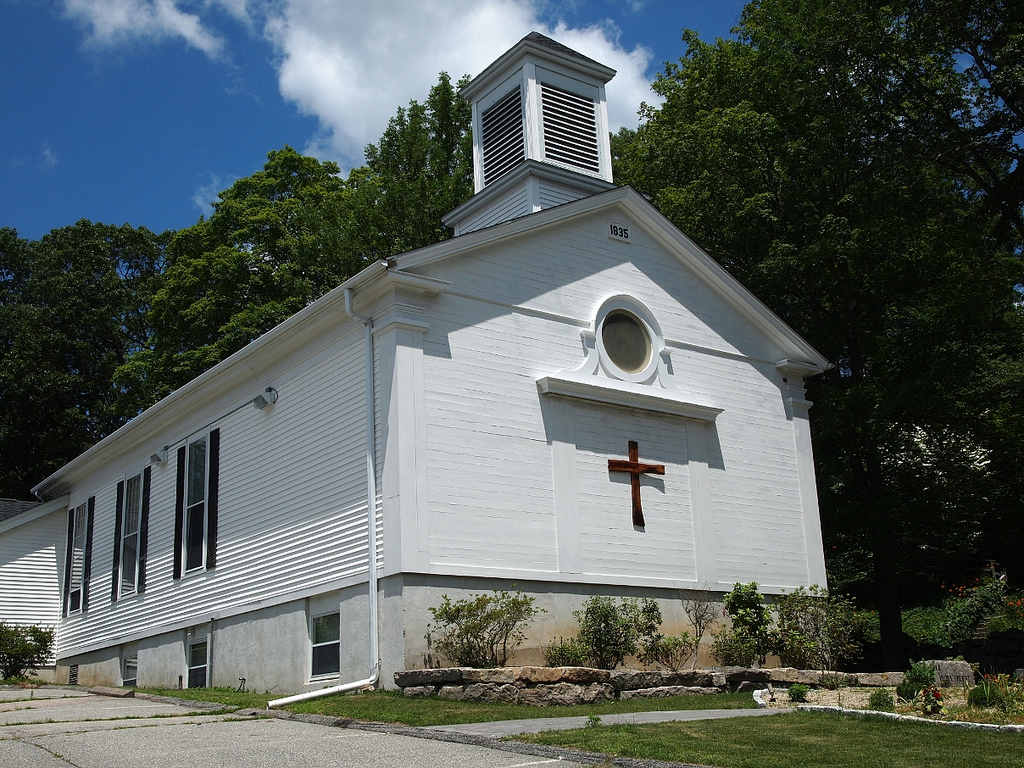
Quaker Hill Baptist Church (1835)

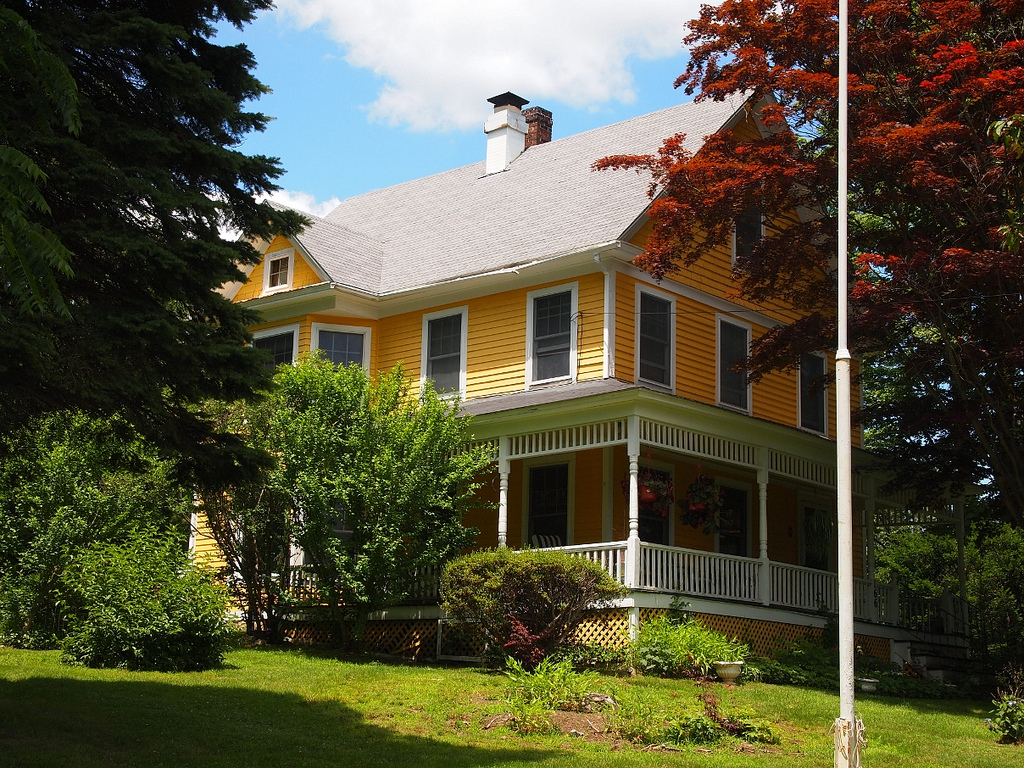
American Queen Anne style (1900)

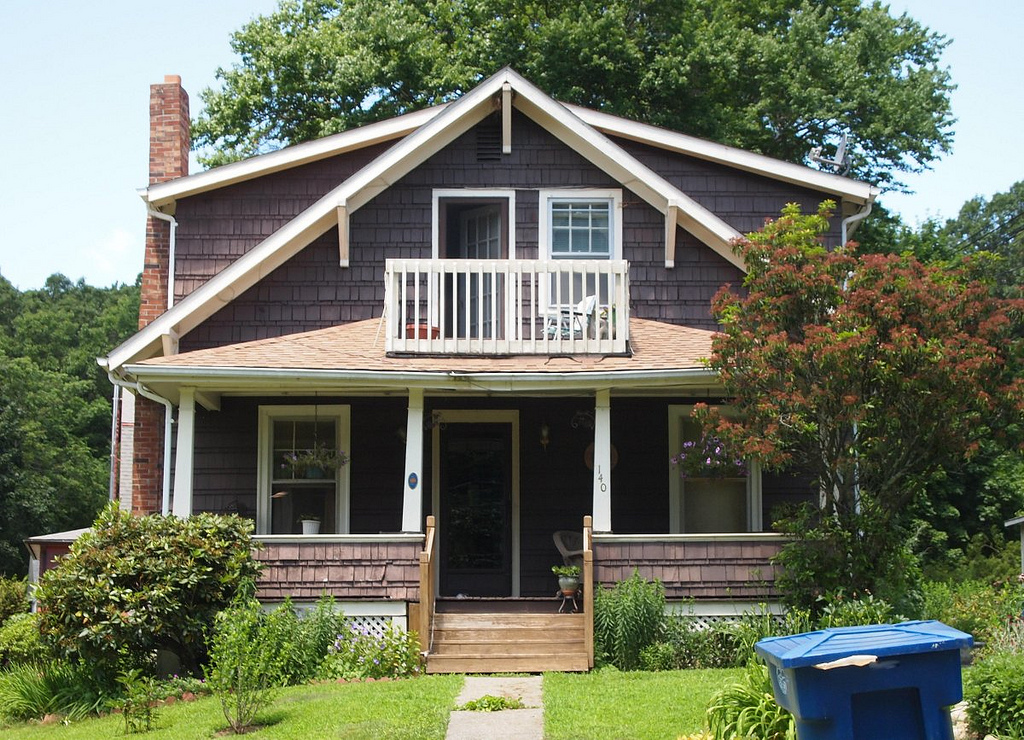
American Craftsman (1926)

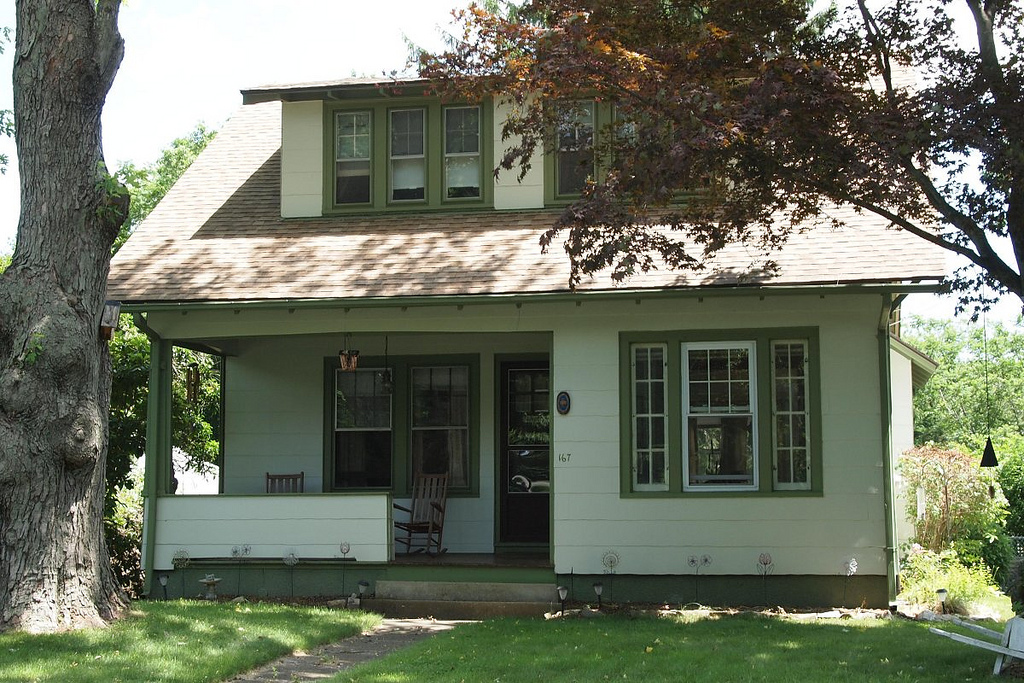
Bungalow (1930)

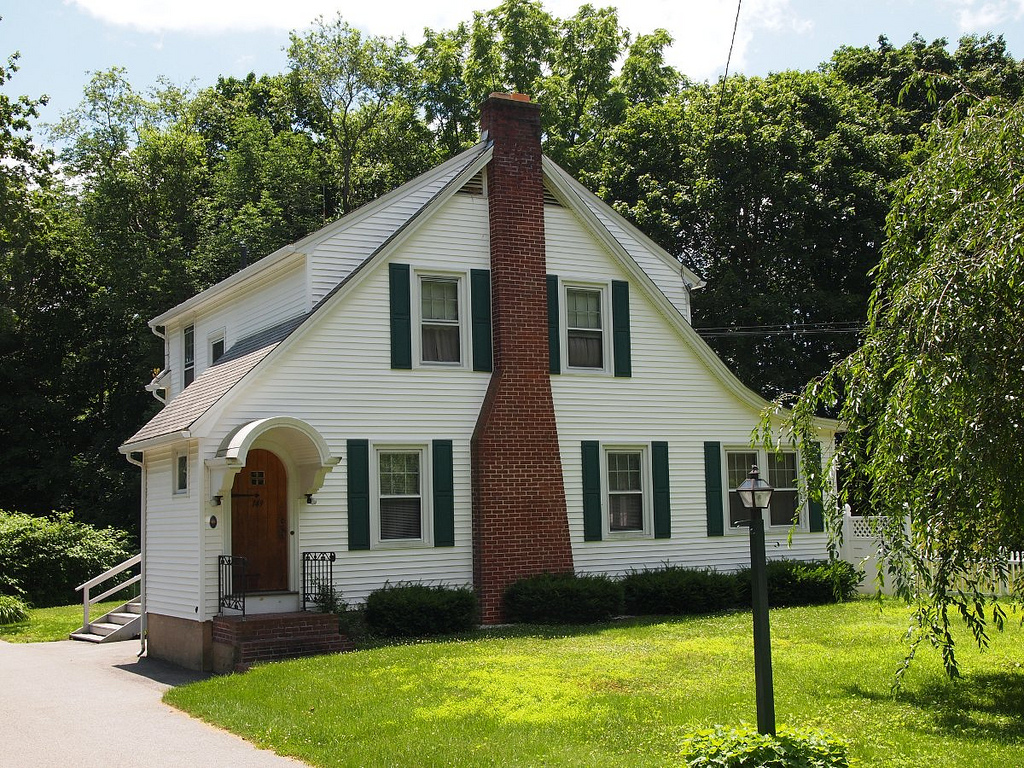
Dutch Colonial Revival (1936)

== See also ==
- Quaker Hill, Connecticut
- National Register of Historic Places listings in New London County, Connecticut
