= Smith Cove (Connecticut) =

Smith Cove is the name of several coves in the US state of Connecticut.

- 41.3359312°N 72.1892449°W in New London County; also known as Alewife Cove, Bolles Cove, Smiths Cove, The Cove. It is connected to the Thames River.
- 41.0123196°N 73.6198482°W in Fairfield County; also known as Indian Harbor
- 41.3988211°N 72.1063230°W in New London County
- Keeny Cove (sometimes known as Smith Cove) 41.3506535°N 72.1795226°W in New London County
