= Grand Master of the Sacred Apostolic Hospice =

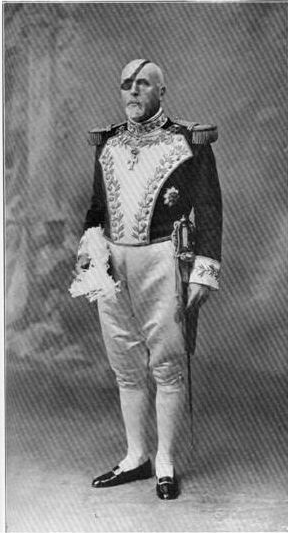
Alessandro Ruspoli, VII Prince of Cerveteri. Grand Master of the Sacred Apostolic Hospice.

The Grand Master of the Sacred Apostolic Hospice (Italian: Gran Maestro del Sacro Ospizio) or Quartermaster-General of the Sacred Palaces is a hereditary official of the Pontifical Household. This post is the highest ranking post available to laymen. The title and office became hereditary on June 28, 1808, when Pope Pius VII appointed Prince Francesco Ruspoli as Grand Master.

The Grand Master is a Participating Privy Chamberlain and the sole lay member of the Noble Privy Antechamber, as well as a Participating Privy Chamberlain of the Sword and Cape (made up of laymen, traditionally holding hereditary posts).

From 1808 with Francesco Ruspoli, 3rd prince of Cerveteri, the Ruspoli family assumed the office of Grand Master of the Sacred Hospice and succeeded in the Conti family.

== Title holders ==
Grand Master of the Sacred Apostolic Hospice	Period
Created by Pope Pius VII
Francesco Ruspoli, 3rd Prince of Cerveteri	1808-1829
Alessandro Ruspoli, 4th Prince of Cerveteri	1829-1842
Giovanni Nepomucene Ruspoli, 5th Prince of Cerveteri	1842-1876
Francesco Maria Ruspoli, 6th Prince of Cerveteri	1876-1907
Alessandro Ruspoli, 7th Prince of Cerveteri	1907-1942
Francesco Ruspoli, 8th Prince of Cerveteri	1942-1989

The reform of the Papal Curia abolished the post in 1968, keeping the title purely honorary.

== See also ==
- Ruspoli
