= Castello Ruspoli =

Castle in the Italian comune of Vignanello (VT)

Coordinates: 42.384225°N 12.280612°E

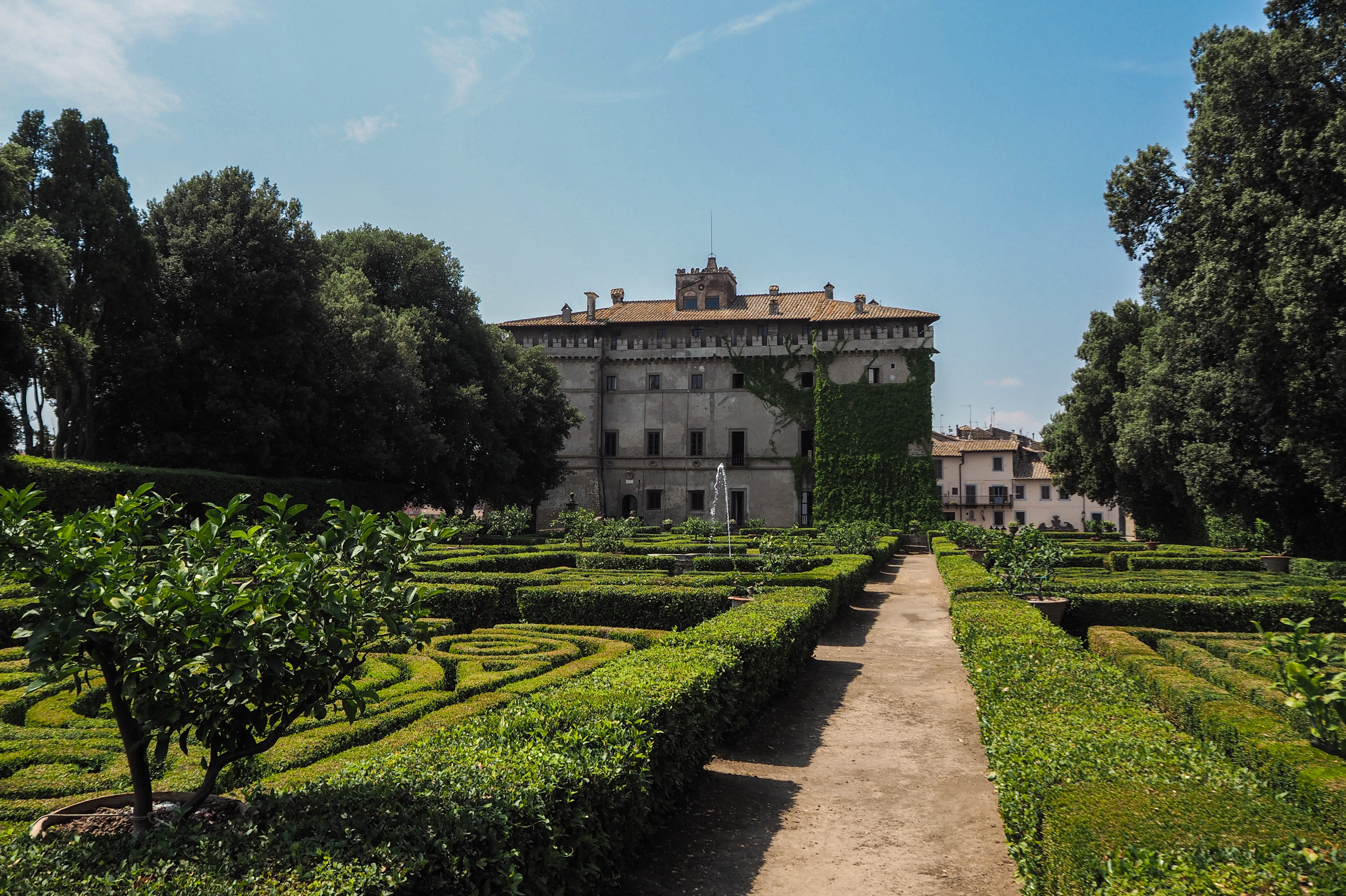
Castello Ruspoli in Vignanello

Castello Ruspoli is a 16th-century castle in the town of Vignanello, Lazio, Italy. It continues to be the property of the Ruspoli family, an old and noble Italian family. It is well known for its Renaissance-era Giardino all'italiana.

== History ==
In 1531, Pope Clement VII awarded Vignanello as a fief to Beatrice Farnese. Her daughter, Ottavia, married Sforza Marescotti, and the Farnese Pope Paul III confirmed the fief and elevated the couple to the first count and countess of Vignanello. The castle was built around 1574 as the seat of the count and countess, elaboration was attributed to Jacopo Barozzi da Vignola. In the 17th century the Renaissance gardens were created by Ottavia Orsini who had married into the family. The gardens still stand and are one of the best preserved examples of an Italian Renaissance garden. The castle contains on the ground floor a chapel dedicated to Sister Giacinta, a Ruspoli family member who was canonized a Saint by Pope Pius VII in 1807.

The Ruspoli family was an influential Italian noble family with close connections to the Holy See. Francesco Maria Ruspoli, the 6th Count of Vignanello, was made the 1st Prince of Cerveteri, and the family has used the Princely title ever since. Many generations of the family lived at the castle in Vignanello, although the family had residences in Rome and Cerveteri as well. The castle continues to be in the possession of the Ruspoli family and serves as a private residence, but is open for visits and events.

== See also ==
- Black nobility
- Grand Master of the Sacred Apostolic Hospice
- Prince of Cerveteri
- Dado Ruspoli
