= Ruspoli family =

Italian noble family

Ruspoli
- noble family
- Parent house: House of Marescotti
- Country: Duchy of Florence; Papal States; Grand Duchy of Tuscany; Kingdom of Italy; Kingdom of Spain
- Current region: Italy; Spain; European Union
- Founded: 9th century
- Current head: Prince Francesco Maria Ruspoli, 10th Prince of Cerveteri
- Titles: Cardinal (non-hereditary); Grand Master of the Sacred Apostolic Hospice; Patrizio Romano; Prince of the Holy Roman Empire; Prince of Cerveteri; Prince of Candriano; Prince of Parrano; Prince of Poggio Suasa; Duke of Morignano; Marquess of Riano; Count of Vignanello; Noble of Viterbo; Noble of Orvieto
- Motto: Loyalement sans douter (French for 'Loyally without doubt')
- Estates: Castello Ruspoli; Palazzo Ruspoli
- Cadet branches: Ruspoli-Sueca; Ruspoli-Boadilla del Monte (extinct); Ruspoli-Poggio Suasa; Ruspoli-Candriano (extinct); Ruspoli-Morignano; Ruspoli-Fiano (extinct)

The House of Ruspoli is an Italian noble family originally from Florence that became one of the great aristocratic families of Rome. Part of the black nobility, the family was elevated to princely status, as the Princes of Cerveteri, by Pope Clement XI in 1709. In 1721, the family was elevated to the status of Roman princes in the Papal States. The head of the family traditionally serves in the Pontifical Household as the Grand Master of the Sacred Apostolic Hospice.

== History ==
The origins of the family can be traced back to the Ruspoli of Florence in the 13th century, and more remotely from Marius Scotus in the 8th century and his descendants the Marescotti of Bologna. In the 16th century, the Ruspoli family moved to Rome, where the last descendant, Vittoria Ruspoli, Marchioness of Cerveteri, married Sforza Vicino Marescotti, Count of Vignanello, a descendant of the Farnese family on both his mother's and father's side. One of Vittoria's sons took the Ruspoli name and coat of arms to guarantee the continuity of the house.

In 1708, Vittoria's grandson, Francesco Marescotti Ruspoli, head of the Ruspoli Regiment, fought to defend the Papal States. In 1709, he forced the Austrians to retreat, and Pope Clement XI named him the first Prince of Cerveteri. This title would then pass down to the first-born son of each generation. The papal title of Roman Prince was later conferred in 1721, and it is also held by the first-born son of each generation.

Since 1808, the head of the family also served as Grand Master of the Sacred Apostolic Hospice, which was an hereditary official of the Pontifical Household. He was a Participating Privy Chamberlain and the sole lay member of the Noble Privy Antechamber, as well as a Participating Privy Chamberlain of the Sword and Cape (who were all laymen, traditionally holding hereditary posts). The post was removed in the reforms of the Papal Curia after 1968, leaving just the honorific title.

=== The Ruspoli origins ===
There are traces of members of the Ruspoli family from the 13th century on tombstones in the churches of Ognisanti and of Santa Maria Novella in Florence.

Some of its members, in chronological order:

- Lorenzo Ruspoli – Florentine noble — lived in the early 13th century.
- Neri Ruspoli – chief Ghibellin – in 1266 the Guelphs burned down his house in Florence.
- Ser Bonaccorso Ruspoli — notary in Florence and Ghino Ruspoli — lived in 1304
- Roberto Ruspoli — lived mid-14th century
- Giovanni Ruspoli – born in 1363 – Gonfaloniere and prior in 1391 — built the Gentilizia chapel in Ognissanti Church.
- Roberto Ruspoli and Zanobi Ruspoli – lived in 1391
- Lorenzo Ruspoli – born in 1384 – Praetor of Begonia in 1432 — Praetor of Piccioli in 1460 – Gonfaloniere of Florence
- Giovanni Ruspoli – born on April 25, 1420 – Buried in Ognissanti — marries 1) Maddalena Buti 2) Bartolomea Paffi
- Lorenzo Ruspoli – born in 1460 – took part in many the travels of Amerigo Vespucci – marries Alessandra da Magguale

It is Bartolomeo, son of the above-mentioned Lorenzo, that the family moved away from the imperial Ghibellines and came closer to the Vatican State in Rome.

Bartolomeo Ruspoli was born in Florence in 1496. He formed a business partnerships with the Altoviti family, who were influential wool traders and bankers. In 1529 Bartolomeo travelled to Rome where he married Maria Ardinghelli niece of Cardinal Niccolò Ardinghelli, an influential member of the Farnese fraction and an intimate associate of Alessandro Farnese, future Pope Paul III. The Ruspoli were thus integrated into the Roman Curia and the papal court, and Bartolomeo's children, both sons and daughters, were all married into families of the Roman nobility: Muti, Cavalieri and Floridi. In 1531 Bartolomeo Ruspoli was named Petitioner of the apostolic letters by Pope Clement VII. In 1535 he was made Prior of Florence.

Gradually, and certainly by the 17th century, the Ruspoli had lost their identity as Florentine merchants and bankers, referring to themselves exclusively as Roman nobles.

=== The Marescotti origins ===
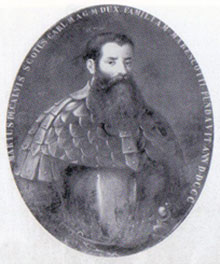
Old painting of Marius Scotus

According to the Marescotti-Ruspoli archive and as often seen on various family trees and reported on the official "Libro d'oro della Nobiltà Italiana" published by the Collegio Araldico, the origins of the Marescotti can be traced back to Marius Scotus born in Galloway in south west Scotland in the 8th century.

In the year 773 king Charlemagne started a military campaign against the Lombards in Italy, because they were not respecting an agreement made with Pepin the Short to give part of their land to the state of the Church. He asked for help from king of Dál Riata (Western Scotland) Eochaid IV. The latter asked his cousin Count William of Douglas to recruit and bring to France a brigade of 4,000 men, which he did. But soon thereafter he had to return to Scotland to govern the family clan, leaving his command to his younger brother Marius Douglas, who at the time was described as courageous, tall, strong and with a reddish beard.

The army of the Franks crossed the Alps and took base in the Benedictine Abbey of Novalesa, in the high valley of Dora Riparia. Mario Scoto, as he was known in Italy, discovered a small path through forests between the mountains which was absolutely unusable by the army, but perfect for the Scottish highlanders. After walking quietly for three days along the path, Mario Scoto and his men attacked the Lombards by surprise from the back, while king Charlemagne attacked with the cavalry from the front. It was a major victory for the Franks which marked the decline of the Lombards in Italy.

In the spring of the following year, Pope Adrian I and the king decided to meet. With a small escort, amongst whom Mario Scoto was present, Charlemagne travelled the ancient via Cassia to Saint Peter's Basilica where he was received and blessed by the pope. Mario Scoto was Catholic as were the majority of Scottsmen at the time and at the service of his king became himself a defender of the Faith. He became an appreciated military advisor and distinguished himself in the Spanish campaign and in the battle against the Saxons at the confluence of the Weser with the Aller in which of the 5,000 Saxons, only the 500 who chose to be baptised were spared their lives.

Towards the end of the century Mario Scoto retired from the army, married an Italian noblewoman called Marozia and, for his devotion to the pope, settled in Rome where he was granted the honor to escort the pope. He was therefore present when in April 799 Pope Leo III was assaulted and kidnapped near the church of San Lorenzo in Lucina. Mario Scoto was able to find the pope in a monastery on the Aventine Hill and rescued him and returned him to his throne at the Holy See. The scene was later painted in Bologna by Giuseppe Antonio Caccioli.

Mariscotti Coat of Arms

On Christmas Day 800 Mario Scoto was invested Count of Bagnacavallo in Romagna and was granted the privilege to adorn his family crest, which already had the rampant leopard of Scotland, with the three fleur-de-lis, characteristic symbol of the French kings.

The family still conserves an old portrait of a soldier with the following encryption in Latin: "Marius de Calveis, Scotus, Carl Mag M Dux Familiam Marescotti Fundavit ANN D. DCCC" (Marius of Galloway, Scottish, military commander under Charlemagne, founder of the Marescotti family. AD 800)

In the 9th century the Marescotti people (name derived from Mario Scoto) carried the title of counts of Bagnacavallo, a large fiefdom between the Lamone and Savio rivers. Charlemagne had received vast lands in the Bologna area and had later distributed them, as was the custom in those days, to the veterans of his army.

Some members of the family in chronological order:

Alberto il Malvicino de Calveiso de' Calvi Count of Bagnacavallo. Alberto Count of Bagnacavallo. Ermes, Massimiliano and Oddo Marescotti (Mariscotti) were Consuls of Orvieto respectively in 1035, 1091 e 1099. Carbone - in 1120 build a tower in Bologna. Marescotto - Consul of Imola nel 1140

Raniero Marescotti - elected cardinal by Pope Lucius II December 18, 1144.

Marescotto - Consul of Bologna e Captain general of Bologna in the war against Imola in 1179. Pietro de' Calvi Marescotti - Podestà of Faenza in 1185. Marescotto Consul of Bologna 1227 Guglielmo - Podestà di Siena nel 1232, his son Corrado was Chancellor of Emperor Frederick II in 1249. Alberto Marescotti son of Ugolino was Consul of Bologna, Captain general of the infantry of Bologna, then took Faenza in 1281 and regained Imola in 1290.

=== From Renaissance to Enlightment ===
The navy commander Fabrizio Ruspoli son of Bartolomeo Ruspoli and Maria Ardinghelli distinguished himself in the Battle of Lepanto. The Ottomans lost all but 30 of its ships and as many as 30,000 men, a decisive victory for Christianity and a strategic military one, that marked the start of the decline of the Ottoman's power in the Mediterranean. The Christians attributed the victory to the protection of the Virgin Mary, whom they had invoked by reciting the Rosary, and Pope Pius V instituted a feast in its honor as Our Lady of Victory.

Orazio Ruspoli, brother of Fabrizio, became a successful banker and was then named magistrate of the colleges in 1557. Together with his third brother Alessandro he started the Banco Ruspoli in Siena and the family became very wealthy. Orazio married Felice Cavalieri and had two children.

Lorenzo Ruspoli, their cousin, was in the wool trade and also became a successful banker in Florence and then Consul. he then married lady Maria di Bernardo Franceschi and had two children; Antonio and Francesco (born August 20, 1579). The latter became a published satirical poet.

Vittoria Ruspoli, daughter of Orazio and Felice Cavalieri, married in 1617 Sforza Vicino Marescotti, Count of Vignanello, Lord of Parrano, Roman noble and Patrizio of Bologna, Magistrate of Conservatori of Bologna in 1632 and Conservatore di Roma in 1654. Vittoria's brother, Bartolomeo Ruspoli after acquiring the fiefdom of the Marquis of Cerveteri and in Rome the Palace on the Ara Coeli, having no children of his own donated everything to the heirs of her sister.

Vittoria's husband, Sforza Vicino, descended from the Farnese family from both his mother's and his father's side (see the image on the right). From his father's side he inherited the fiefdom of Vignanello (from the wedding between Sfortia Marescotti and Ortesia Farnese Countess of Vignanello). His grandmother was Giulia Farnese. The entire branch of the Farnese (Dukes of Latera) became extinct and the descendants of the Marescottis (later called Ruspolis by will of Vittoria Ruspoli) kept the fiefdom and the Castello Ruspoli in Vignanello up to our days.

Meanwhile, Clarice born March 6, 1585, sister of Sforza Vicino Marescotti, became a nun in the convent of San Bernardino in Viterbo with the name of Sister Giacinta. She was canonized Saint by Pope Pius VII in 1807.

Her feast is celebrated on January 30.

Galeazzo Marescotti, son of Sforza Vicino and Vittoria was elected cardinal by Pope Clement X.

== The Marescotti-Ruspoli ==
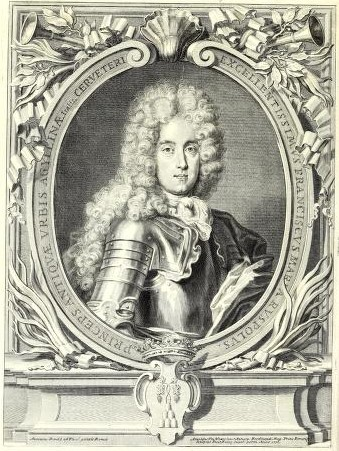
Francesco Maria Marescotti Ruspoli, first prince of Cerveteri

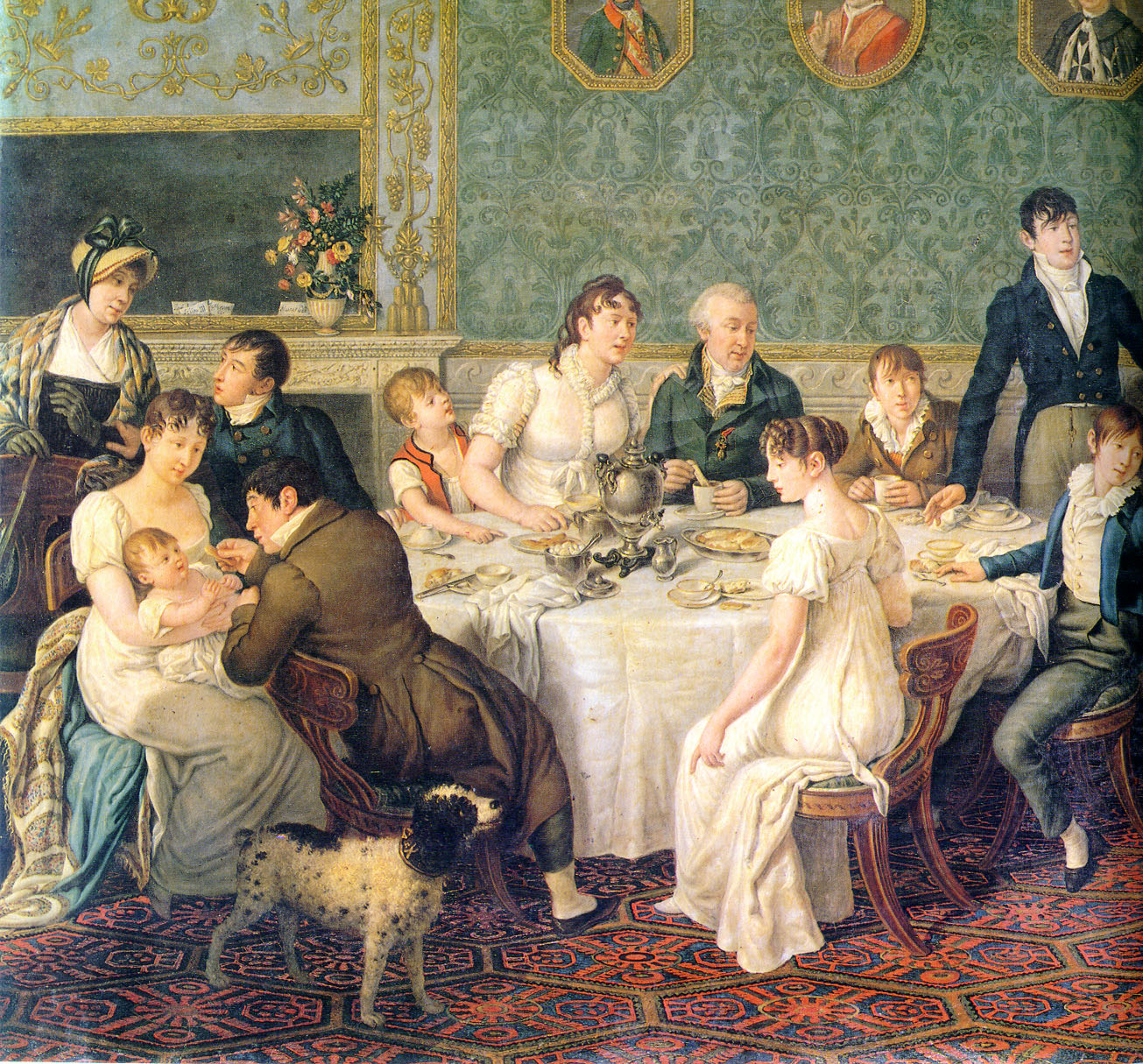
The Ruspoli family in 1807

Francesco Maria Marescotti Ruspoli, first-born son of Alessandro (of Sforza Vicino Marescotti, 4th Conte di Vignanello and Vittoria dei Principi Ruspoli), was born March 2, 1672. In 1695 he married lady Isabella Cesi, daughter of Giuseppe Angelo, fifth Duke of Acquasparta and Giacinta Conti of the Dukes of Poli and Guadagnolo (sister of Pope Innocent XIII).

Francesco Maria appreciated and helped the development of Academy of Arcadia of which he was a member under the pseudonym Olinto. He was the first patron to welcome them in one of his villas on Via Merulana. The first volume of the Rime degli Arcadi was dedicated to Francesco Maria. In 1725 the Arcadia took permanent residence in the Gianicolo villa of Bosco Parrasio.

In 1707 George Frideric Handel arrived in Rome where for two years he was a guest of Francesco Maria Ruspoli, who named him Kapellmeister. During this period he composed Salve Regina (HWV 241) which he performed in the Ruspoli Castle in Vignanello and Diana Cacciatrice (HWV 79) which he performed in Palazzo Ruspoli in Cerveteri. In Rome at the Ruspolis and the Ottobonis he performed the oratorios La Resurrezione (HWV 47) and the Trionfo del Tempo e del Disinganno (HWV 46a) both dedicated to Francesco Maria Marescotti Ruspoli. Between 1709 and 1716 he was succeeded as Kapellmeister by Antonio Caldara.

Cardinal Galeazzo Marescotti watched over his beloved nephew. The cardinal had a precise plan: to persuade the pope to elevate the title of the fiefdom of Cerveteri from marquis to prince. Other Roman noble families such as the Aldobrandini, Boncompagni, Borghese and Erba-Odescalchi were made princes by their respective popes. The Ruspolis did not have a pope and it was necessary to make a munificent gesture and to acquire particular merits with the Holy See. In 1707 the cardinal persuaded his nephew to arm a brig to donate to the Holy See. The modern hull with wide sails was delivered in Civitavecchia. Handel had composed for the occasion a choral of white voices on a text greeting the pope king. But that was not enough to elevate Cerveteri to a principality.

In 1708 Francesco Maria created the Ruspoli Regiment at his own expense. Formed by nearly 1,000 men, the regiment enjoyed some minor victories, until 1709 when in Ferrara thanks to a superior armament they were able to push the Austrians back to the north of the Po River. A great victory for which on February 3, 1709, full of gratitude, Pope Clement XI elevated Cerveteri to a Principality.

In 1710 Prince Francesco Maria Marescotti Ruspoli acquired the fiefdom of Riano where he enriched the town with privileges and public works.

In 1713 he acquired the fiefdom of San Felice Circeo which then passed in 1718 to his daughter's husband, Filippo Orsini.

Still in 1713 Francesco Maria bought the Palazzo Ruspoli in Rome from the Caetani who had charged Martino Longhi the Younger to build the sumptuous loggia on the courtyard and the famous staircase, one of the four wonders of Rome.

In 1721 Pope Benedict XIII conferred to Francesco Maria the title of Principe Romano, for himself and his descendants, ad infinitum so the family could conserve the prestige of its ancestors.

Pope Benedict XIII then came to Vignanello in 1725 to solemnly consecrate the new parish church built by the will of Prince Francesco Maria.

In 1792 Francesco Ruspoli, 3rd Prince of Cerveteri was created Prince of the Holy Roman Empire by the Emperor Francis II.

Today Prince Francesco Ruspoli, 10th Prince of Cerveteri is the head of the House of Ruspoli and resident in Palazzo Ruspoli in Rome.

== Branches ==
=== The Ruspoli Princes ===
- Francesco Maria Marescotti Ruspoli, 1st Prince of Cerveteri
- Alessandro Ruspoli, 2nd Prince of Cerveteri
- Francesco Ruspoli, 3rd Prince of Cerveteri
- Alessandro Ruspoli, 4th Prince of Cerveteri
- Giovanni Nepomucene Ruspoli, 5th Prince of Cerveteri
- Francesco Maria Ruspoli, 6th Prince of Cerveteri
- Alessandro Ruspoli, 7th Prince of Cerveteri
- Francesco Ruspoli, 8th Prince of Cerveteri
- Alessandro (Dado) Ruspoli, 9th Prince of Cerveteri
- Francesco Ruspoli, 10th Prince of Cerveteri

==== The Duke of Fiano (extinct) ====
- Augusto Ruspoli, 11th Duke of Fiano

=== The Dukes of Alcudia and Sueca ===
The Prince Camillo Ruspoli, third son of Francesco Ruspoli, 3rd Prince of Cerveteri and Countess Maria Leopoldina von Khevenhüller-Metsch, was married with Carlota Luisa de Godoy and Borbón, daughter of Manuel de Godoy and Alvarez de Faria, Prince of the Peace, and his first wife, María Teresa de Borbón y Vallabriga, XV countess of Chinchón, who was daughter of Infante Luis Antonio de Borbón and Farnese.

- Adolfo Ruspoli, 2nd Duke of Alcudia
- Carlos Ruspoli, 3rd Duke of Alcudia and Sueca
- Camilo Ruspoli, 4th Duke of Alcudia and Sueca
- Carlos Ruspoli, 5th Duke of Alcudia and Sueca
- Luis Carlos Ruspoli, 6th Duke of Alcudia and Sueca

==== The Marquesses of Boadilla del Monte ====
- Luigi Ruspoli, 3rd Marquis of Boadilla del Monte
- Camillo Ruspoli, 4th Marquis of Boadilla del Monte
- Paolo Ruspoli, 5th Marquis of Boadilla del Monte
- Luis Ruspoli, 7th Marquis of Boadilla del Monte

==== The Counts of Bañares ====
- Enrique Jaime Ruspoli, 19th Count of Bañares son of Dona María de Belén Morenés y Arteaga, García-Alesson y Echaguë, 18th Countess of Bañares.

=== The Princes of Poggio Suasa ===
These branches originate from Prince Bartolomeo Ruspoli (1800–1872), third son of Francesco Ruspoli, 3rd Prince of Cerveteri and Countess Maria Leopoldina von Khevenhüller-Metsch, and brother of Alessandro Ruspoli, 4th Prince of Cerveteri and Camillo Ruspoli, Duke of Sueca He married Dona Carolina Ratti. His son Emanuele Ruspoli was named first prince of Poggio-Suasa after participating in the Italian unification and being the first Mayor of the Italian Rome. He was the grandfather of Emmanuelle de Dampierre, Duchess of Segovia and Duchess of Anjou by her marriage to Infante Jaime, Duke of Segovia, son of Alfonso XIII, King of Spain.

- Emanuele Ruspoli, 1st Prince of Poggio Suasa
- Mario Ruspoli, 2nd Prince of Poggio Suasa
- Marcantonio Mario Dimitri Ruspoli, 3rd Prince of Poggio Suasa
- Costantino Mario Ruspoli, 4th Prince of Poggio Suasa and 3rd Prince of Candriano

==== The Princes of Candriano ====
- Camillo Ruspoli, 2nd Prince of Candriano

==== The Dukes of Morignano ====
- Francesco Alvaro Maria Giorgio Ruspoli, 1st Duke of Morignano
- Galeazzo Maria Alvise Emanuele Ruspoli, 2nd Duke of Morignano
- Carlo Emanuele Ruspoli, 3rd Duke of Morignano

== Family properties ==
This is a list of some properties associated with the Ruspoli family

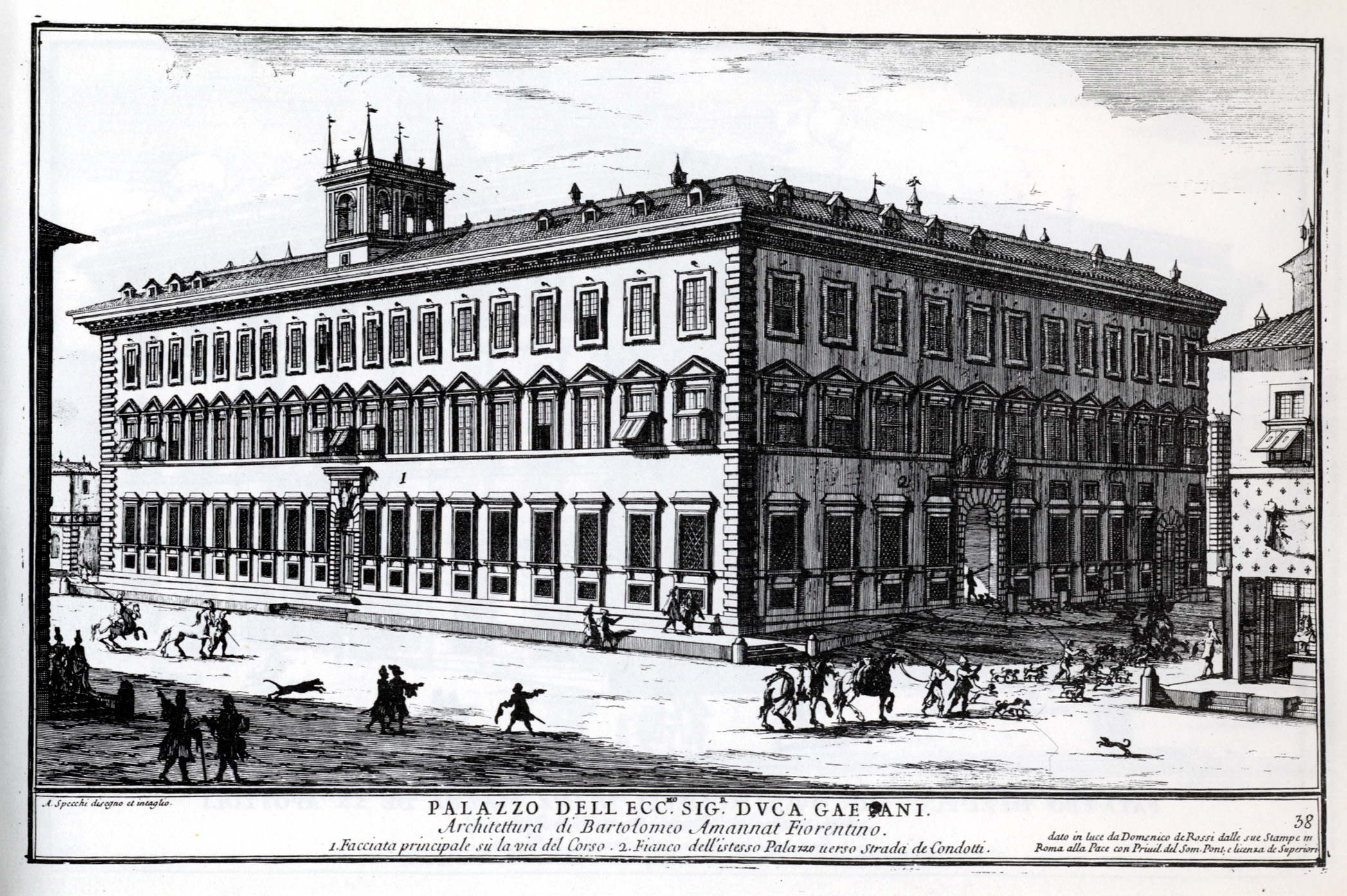
Palazzo Ruspoli, Rome

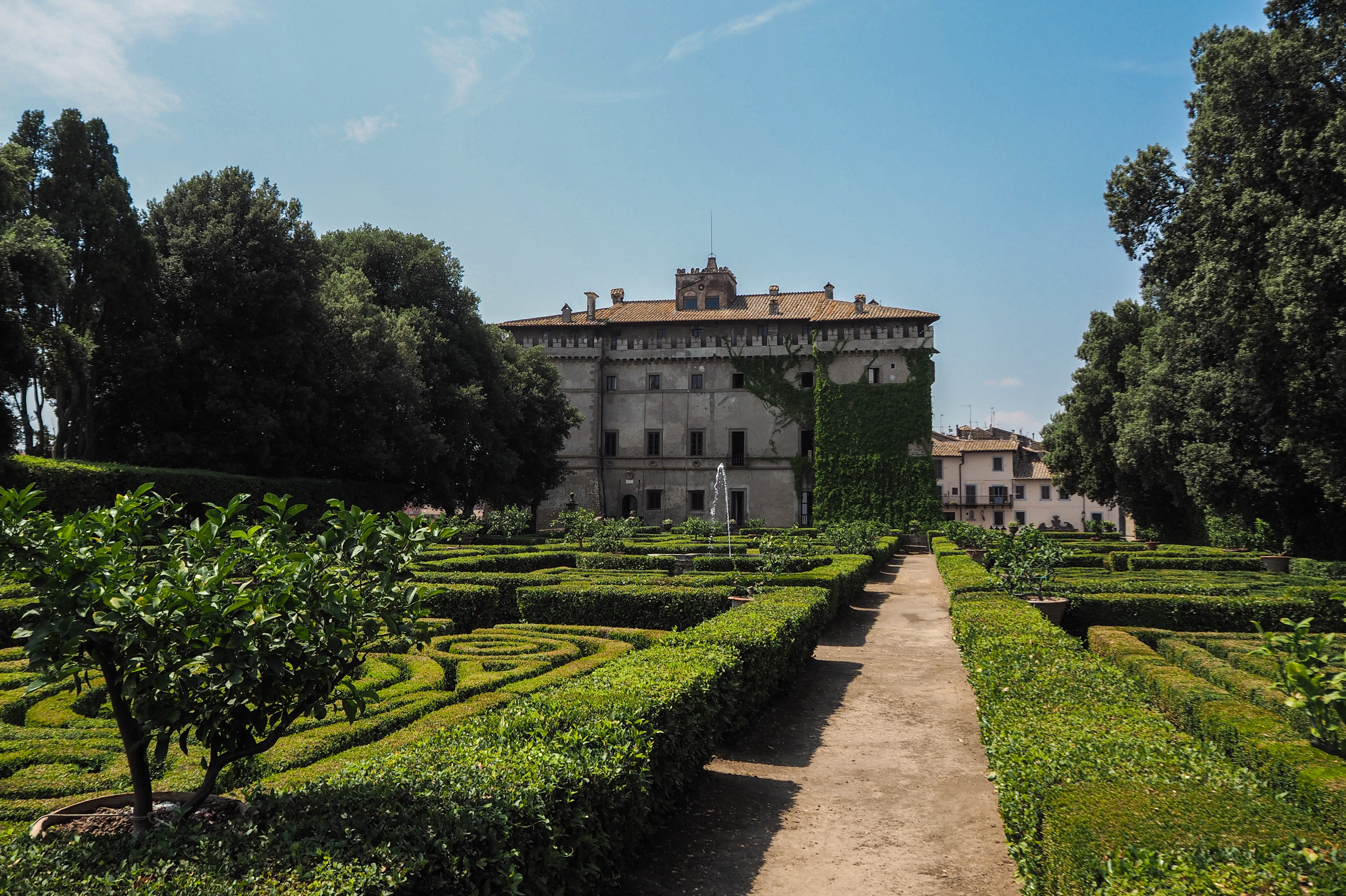
Castello Ruspoli, Vignanello

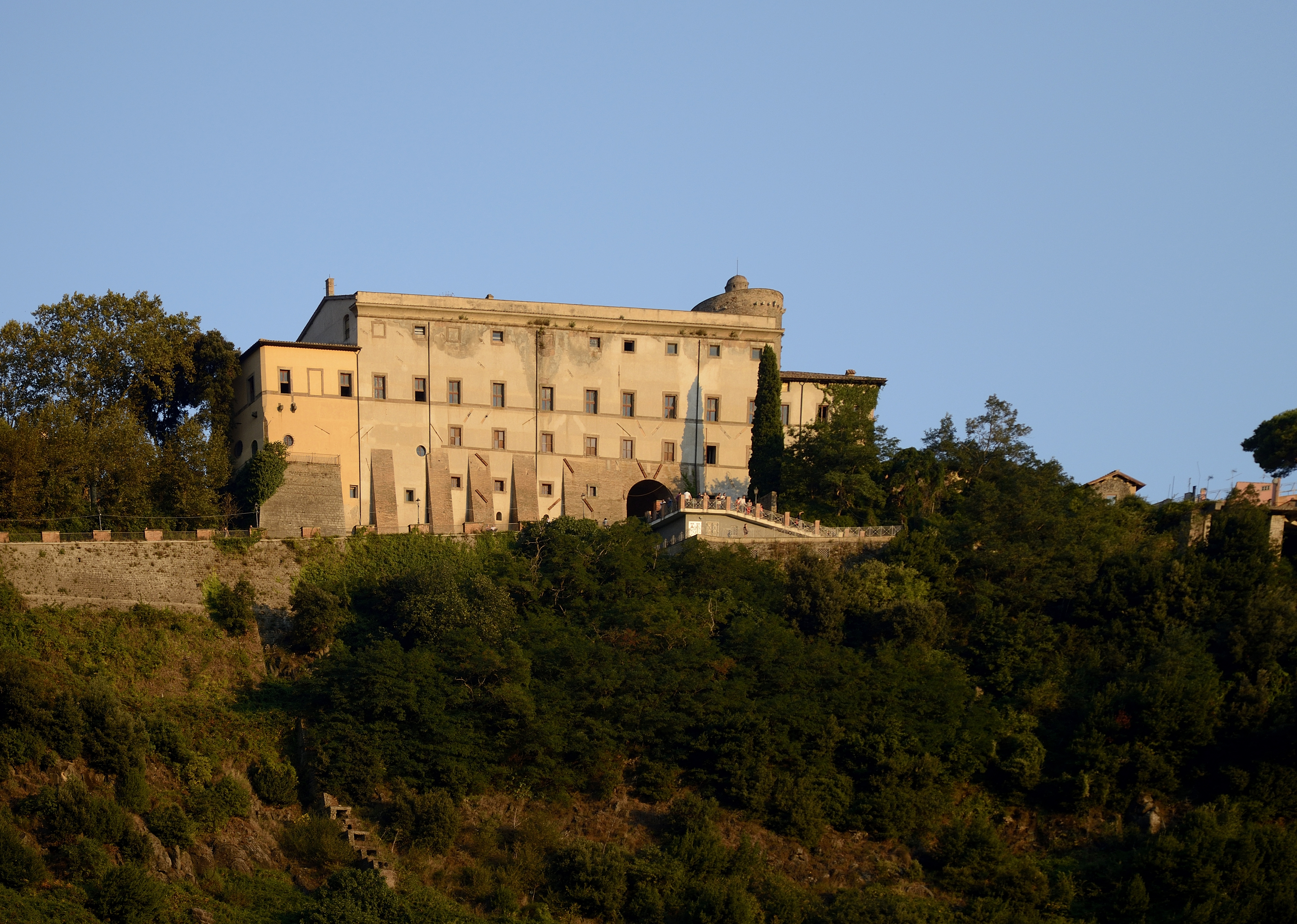
Castle of Nemi

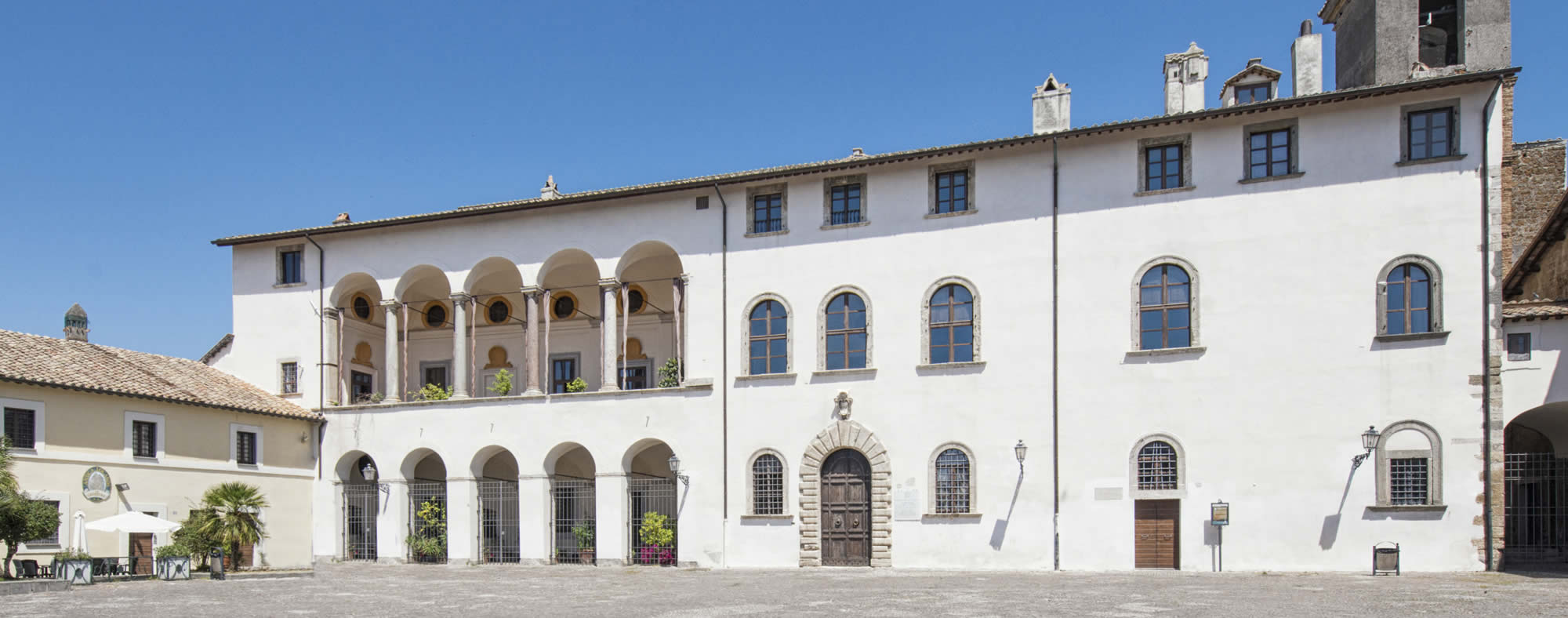
Palace of Cerveteri

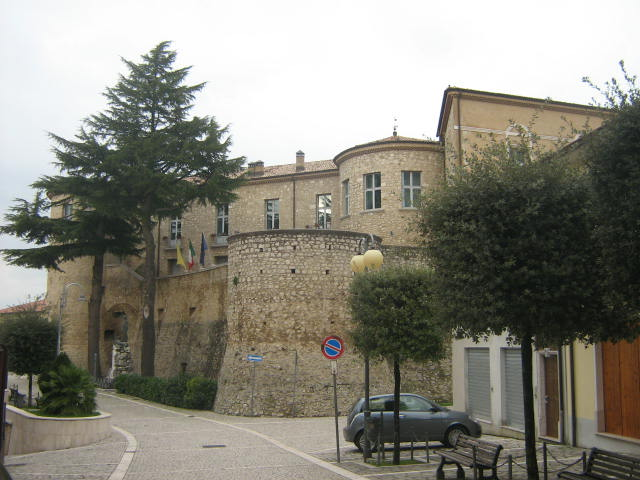
Castel of Candriano

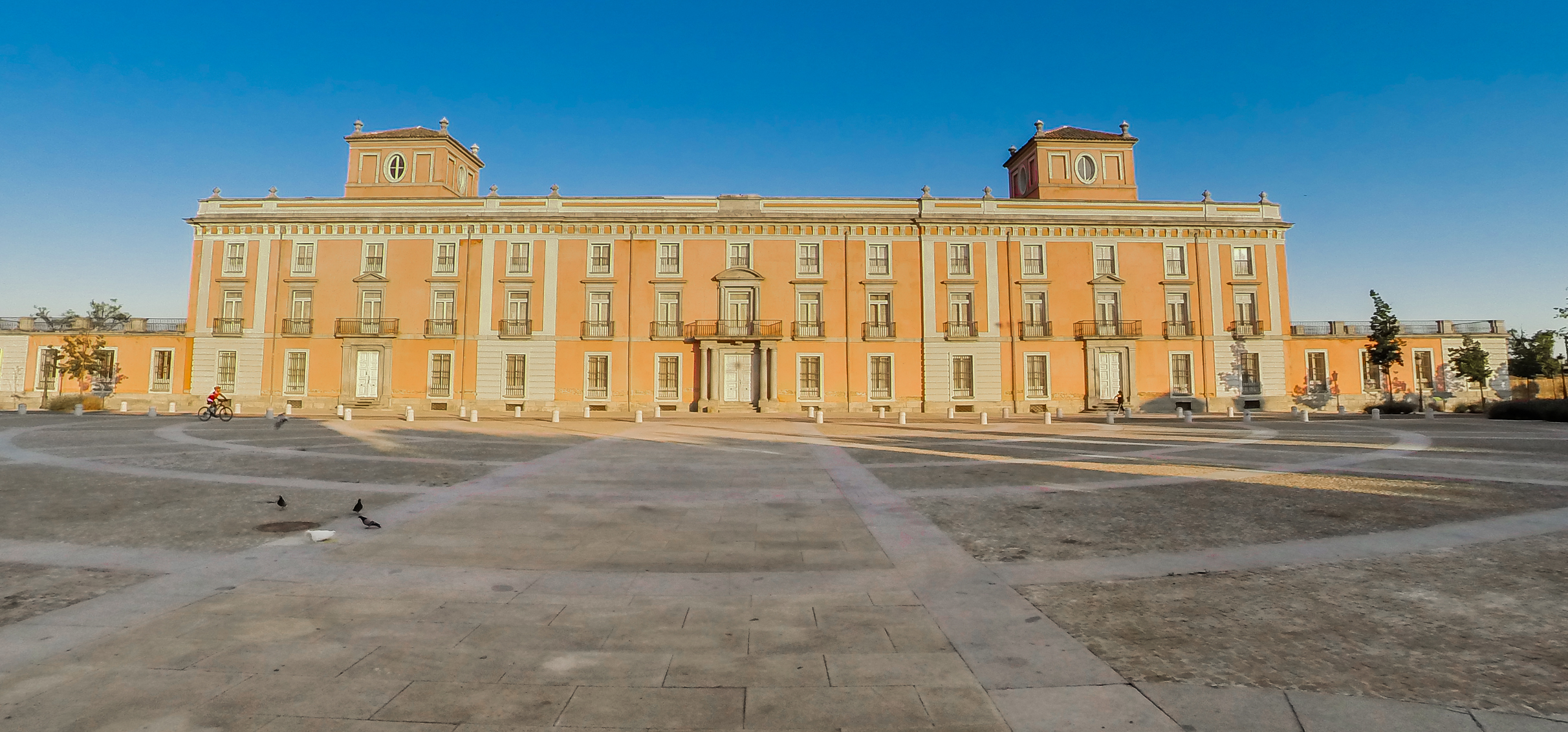
Palace of Boadilla del Monte

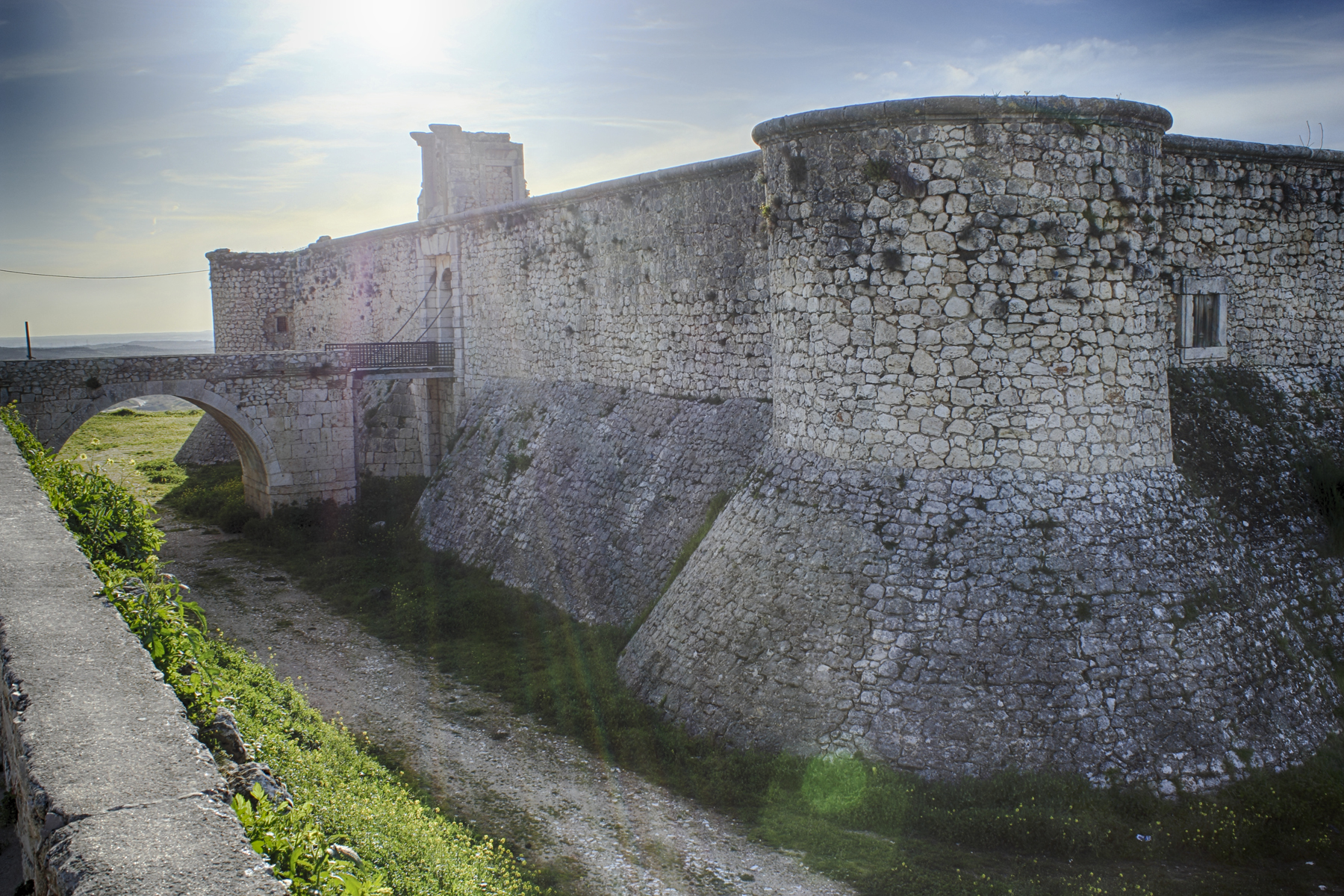
Castle of Chinchón

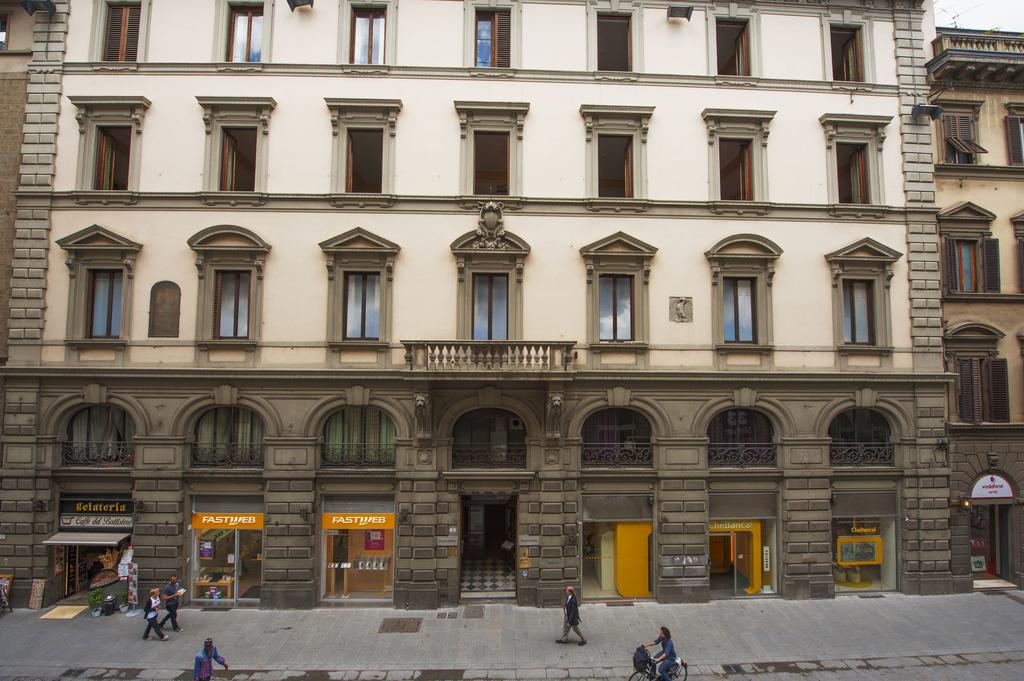
Palazzo Ruspoli in Firenze

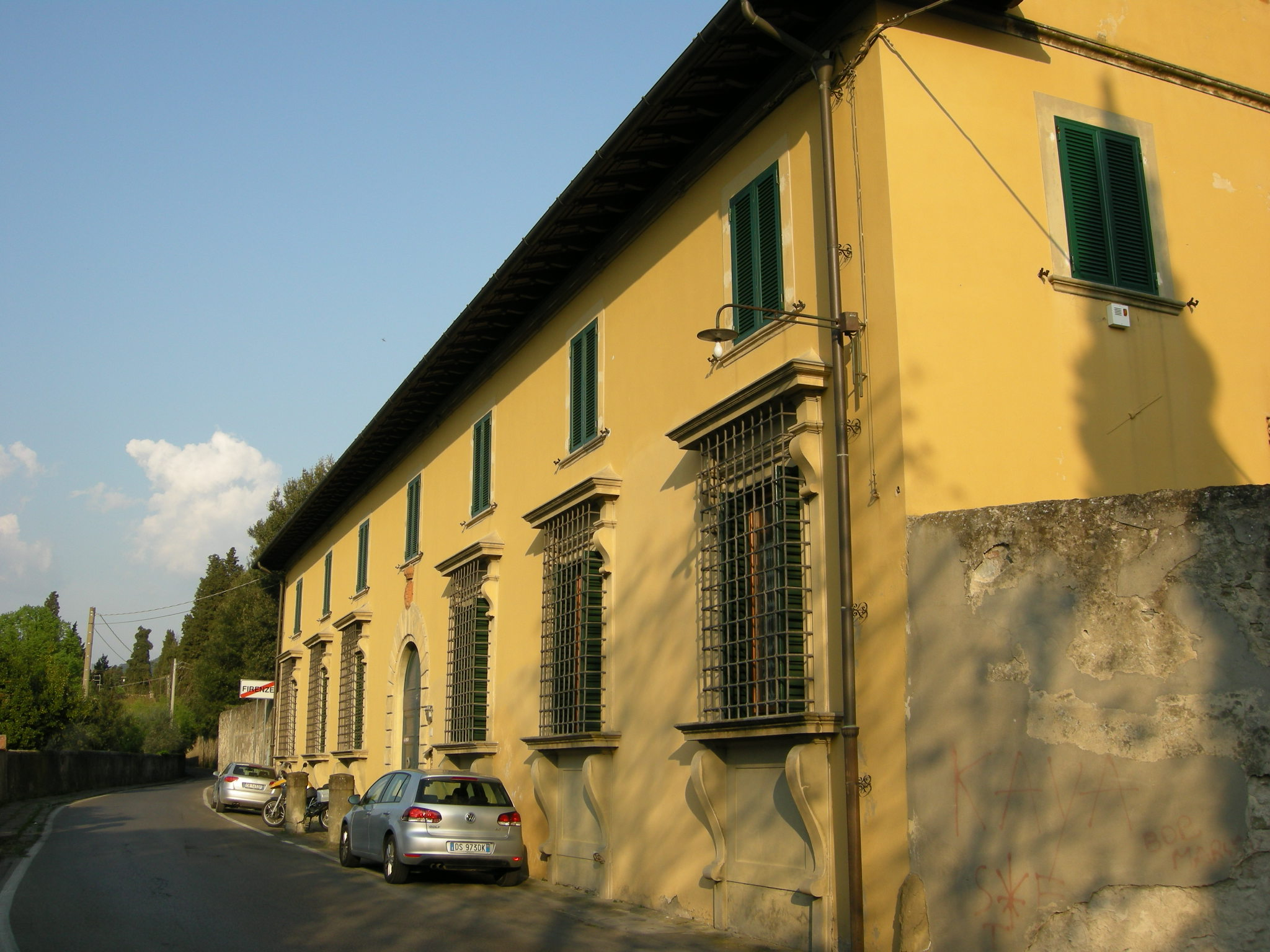
Villa Ruspoli in Firenze

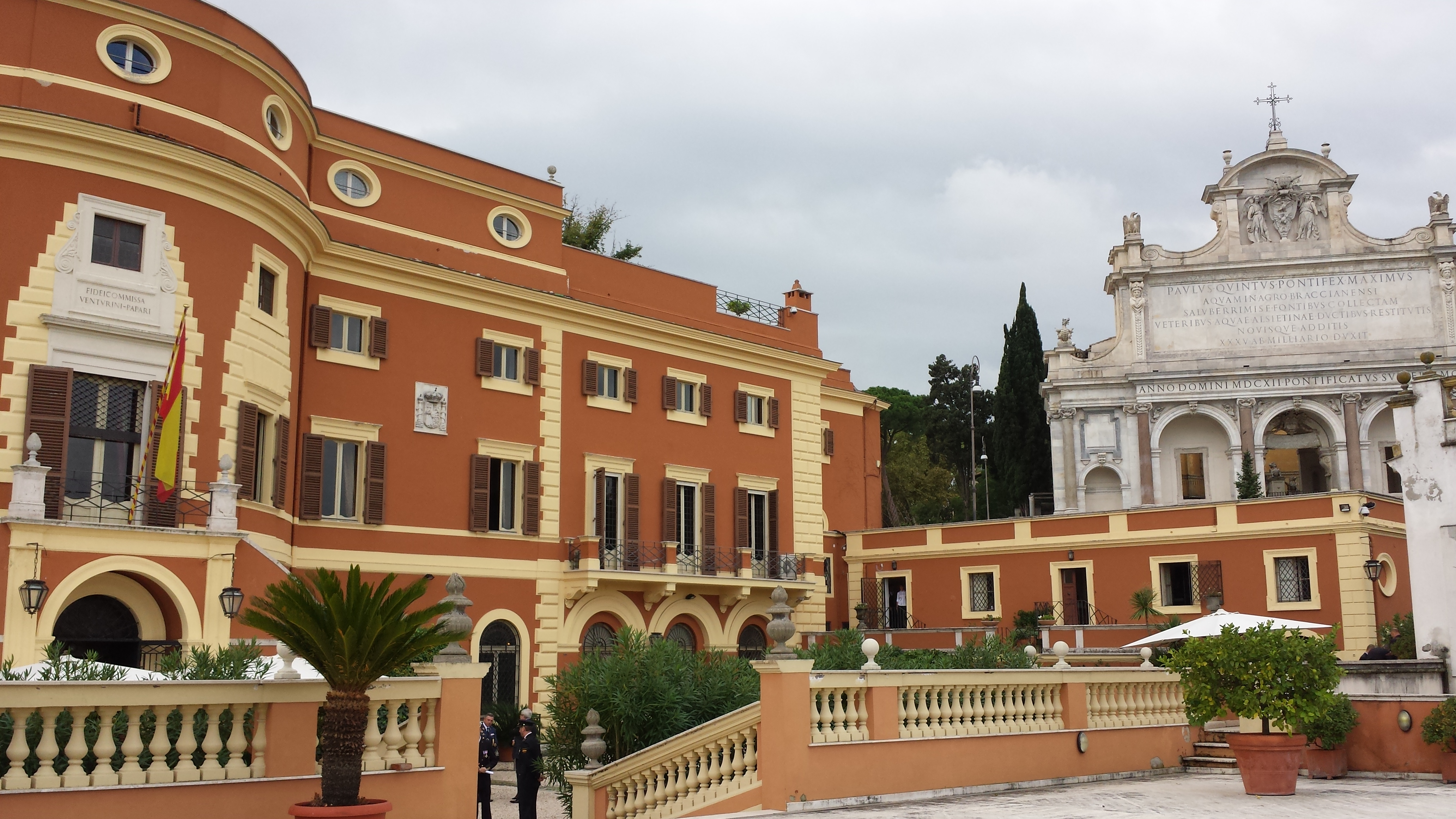
Villa Ruspoli in Rome (current Embassy of Spain)

== Lineage ==
- Vittoria Ruspoli (1598–1681)
  - Alessandro Ruspoli, 5th Count of Vignanello (1628–1703)
    - Francesco Maria Marescotti Ruspoli, 1st Prince of Cerveteri (1672–1731)
      - Bartolomeo Ruspoli (1697–1741)
      - Alessandro Ruspoli, 2nd Prince of Cerveteri (1708–1779)
        - Francesco Ruspoli, 3rd Prince of Cerveteri (1752–1829)
          - Alessandro Ruspoli, 4th Prince of Cerveteri (1784–1842)
            - Giovanni Nepomucene Ruspoli, 5th Prince of Cerveteri (1807–1876)
              - Francesco Maria Ruspoli, 6th Prince of Cerveteri (1839–1907)
                - Alessandro Ruspoli, 7th Prince of Cerveteri (1869–1952)
                  - Francesco Ruspoli, 8th Prince of Cerveteri (1899–1989)
                    - Alessandro Ruspoli, 9th Prince of Cerveteri (1924–2005)
                      - Francesco Ruspoli, 10th Prince of Cerveteri (born 1967)
                        - Alessandro Ruspoli (born 201?)
                      - Théodore Ruspoli (born 1997)
                    - Sforza Ruspoli (1927–2022)
                  - Luigi Ruspoli (1908-¿?)
                    - Giulio Ruspoli (born 1939)
                    - Pietro Ruspoli (born 1940)
                      - Alessandro Ruspoli (born 1980)
            - Augusto Ruspoli (1817–1882)
              - Mario Ruspoli (1855–1888)
                - Augusto Ruspoli, 11th Duke of Fiano (1880–1912)
          - Camillo Ruspoli, Duke of Sueca (1788–1864)
            - Adolfo Ruspoli, 2nd Duke of Alcudia (1822–1914)
              - Carlos Ruspoli, 3rd Duke of Alcudia and Sueca (1858–1936)
                - Camilo Ruspoli, 4th Duke of Alcudia and Sueca (1904–1975)
                  - Carlos Ruspoli, 5th Duke of Alcudia and Sueca (1932–2016)
                  - Luis Ruspoli, 7th Marquis of Boadilla del Monte (1933–2011)
                    - Luis Carlos Ruspoli, 6th Duke of Alcudia and Sueca (born 1963)
                      - Carlos Ruspoli, 7th Duke of la Alcudia (born 1993)
                      - Luis Ruspoli, 4th Baron of Mascalbó (born 1994)
                      - Juan Ruspoli (born 1996)
                      - Jaime Ruspoli (born 2000)
                  - Enrique Jaime Ruspoli, 19th Count of Bañares (born 1935)
            - Luigi Ruspoli, 3rd Marquis of Boadilla del Monte (1828–1893)
              - Camillo Ruspoli, 4th Marquis of Boadilla del Monte (1865–1944)
                - Paolo Ruspoli, 5th Marquis of Boadilla del Monte (1899–1969)
          - Bartolomeo Ruspoli and Khevenhüller-Metsch (1800–1872)
            - Emanuele Ruspoli, 1st Prince of Poggio Suasa (1837–1899)
              - Eugenio Ruspoli (1866–1893)
              - Mario Ruspoli, 2nd Prince of Poggio Suasa (1867–1963)
                - Costantino Ruspoli (1891–1942)
                  - Marcantonio Mario Dimitri Ruspoli, 3rd Prince of Poggio Suasa (1926–2003)
                    - Costantino Mario Ruspoli, 4th Prince of Poggio Suasa (born 1971)
                  - Marescotti Ruspoli (born 1935)
                    - Francesco Ruspoli (born 1958)
                    - Alexis Ruspoli (born 1959)
                - Carlo Ruspoli (1892–1942)
                  - Eugenio Ruspoli (born 1938)
                    - Marescotti Ruspoli (born 1963)
                - Alessandro Ruspoli (1895–1975)
                  - Mario Ruspoli (1925–1986)
                    - Stefano Ruspoli (born 1947)
                - Emanuelle Ruspoli (1900–19¿?)
                  - Carlo Ruspoli (born 1949)
                - Carlo Ruspoli (1906–1947)
                  - Costantino Ruspoli (born 1947)
                    - Bart Ruspoli (born 1976)
              - Camillo Ruspoli, 2nd Prince of Candriano (1882–1949)
              - Francesco Alvaro Maria Giorgio Ruspoli, 1st Duke of Morignano (1891–1970)
                - Galeazzo Maria Alvise Emanuele Ruspoli, 2nd Duke of Morignano (1922–2003)
                  - Carlo Emanuele Ruspoli, 3rd Duke of Morignano (born 1949)*

== See also ==
- Black Nobility
- Grand Master of the Sacred Apostolic Hospice
- Castello Ruspoli
- Ruspoli's turaco
- Ruspoli Sapphire
