= Alessandro Ruspoli, 2nd Prince of Cerveteri =

Prince of Cerveteri (1708–1779)

Alessandro Ruspoli
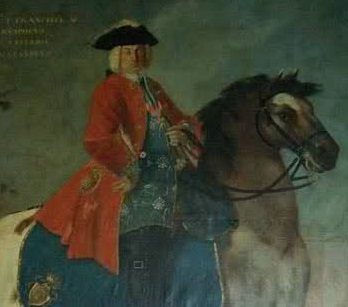

2nd Prince of Cerveteri
- Tenure: 1731–1779
- Predecessor: Francesco Maria Marescotti Ruspoli, 1st Prince of Cerveteri
- Successor: Francesco Ruspoli, 3rd Prince of Cerveteri
- Born: December 3, 1708; Rome, Papal States
- Died: June 20, 1779 (aged 70); Rome, Papal States
- Spouse: Virginia dei Principi dei Altieri di Oriolo; Prudenza di Conti Marescotti-Capizucchi
- Issue: Princess Marianna Ruspoli; Princess Maria Isabella Ruspoli; Francesco Ruspoli, 3rd Prince of Cerveteri; Princess Giacinta Ruspoli; Prince Bartolomeo Ruspoli; Prince Lorenzo Ruspoli
- House: Ruspoli
- Father: Francesco Maria Marescotti Ruspoli, 1st Prince of Cerveteri
- Mother: Isabella Cesi dei Duchi di Acquasparta

Alessandro, Principe Ruspoli (December 3, 1708 – June 20, 1779) was the 2nd Principe di Cerveteri, 2nd Marchese di Riano and 7th Conte di Vignanello. He was the son of Francesco Maria Marescotti Ruspoli, 1st Prince of Cerveteri and his wife Isabella Cesi dei Duchi di Acquasparta, maternal niece of Pope Innocent XIII. His brother was Bartolomeo Ruspoli.

== Marriages and children ==
He married firstly in 1720 as her first husband Virginia Altieri dei Principi di Oriolo (Rome, May 6, 1705 – ?), without issue. The marriage was annulled by the Pope.

He married secondly in 1749 his first cousin Prudenza dei Conti Marescotti-Capizucchi, daughter of his uncle Mario, 1st Conte Marescotti-Capizucchi (1681 – December 23, 1758) and wife Cassandra Sacchetti dei Marchesi di Castel Rigattini, and paternal granddaughter of Alessandro Marescotti, 5th Conte di Vignanello and second wife Prudenza Gabrielli (December 17, 1654 – December 13, 1709), by whom he had six children:

- Donna Marianna dei Principi Ruspoli (ca 1749 – Rome, 1787), unmarried and without issue
- Donna Maria Isabella dei Principi Ruspolii (April 6, 1750 – ?), unmarried and without issue
- Francesco Ruspoli, 3rd Prince of Cerveteri
- Donna Giacinta dei Principi Ruspoli (July 9, 1753 – ?), married Giuseppe Niccolò Spada-Veralli, ?th Principe di Castelviscardo
- Don Bartolomeo dei Principi Ruspoli (1754 – Siena, 1836), unmarried and without issue
- Don Lorenzo dei Principi Ruspoli (October 30, 1755 – 1835), married Camilla Curti (1790–1866), and had a son and a daughter:
  - Donna Agnese dei Principi Ruspoli (November 30, 1810 – ?), married ..., Conte Grimaldi
  - Don Ippolito dei Principi Ruspoli (March 13, 1817 – February 17, 1886), married Elisabetta dei Marchesi Pepoli dei Conti di Castiglione (June 14, 1829 – October 18, 1892), maternal granddaughter of Joachim Murat and wife Caroline Bonaparte, and had two daughters:
    - Donna Letizia dei Principi Ruspoli (Rome, July 13, 1849 – Rome, December 27, 1944), married in Rome, February 6, 1871 Mario Rappini, Marchese di Casteldelfino (Sezze-Delfino, July 29, 1834 – August 19, 1899)
    - Donna Giacinta Carolina dei Principi Ruspoli (1861–1862)

== See also ==
- Ruspoli

Italian nobility
Preceded by Francesco Maria, 1st Prince of Cerveteri	Prince of Cerveteri; 1731–1779	Succeeded by Francesco Ruspoli, 3rd Prince of Cerveteri
