= Alessandro Ruspoli =

Alessandro Ruspoli may refer to:

- Alessandro Ruspoli, 2nd Prince of Cerveteri (1708–1779)
- Alessandro Ruspoli, 4th Prince of Cerveteri (1784–1842)
- Alessandro Ruspoli, 7th Prince of Cerveteri (1869–1952)
- Alessandro Ruspoli, 9th Prince of Cerveteri (1924–2005), actor, playboy and eccentric aristocrat
