= Emanuele Ruspoli, 1st Prince of Poggio Suasa =

Emanuele Ruspoli
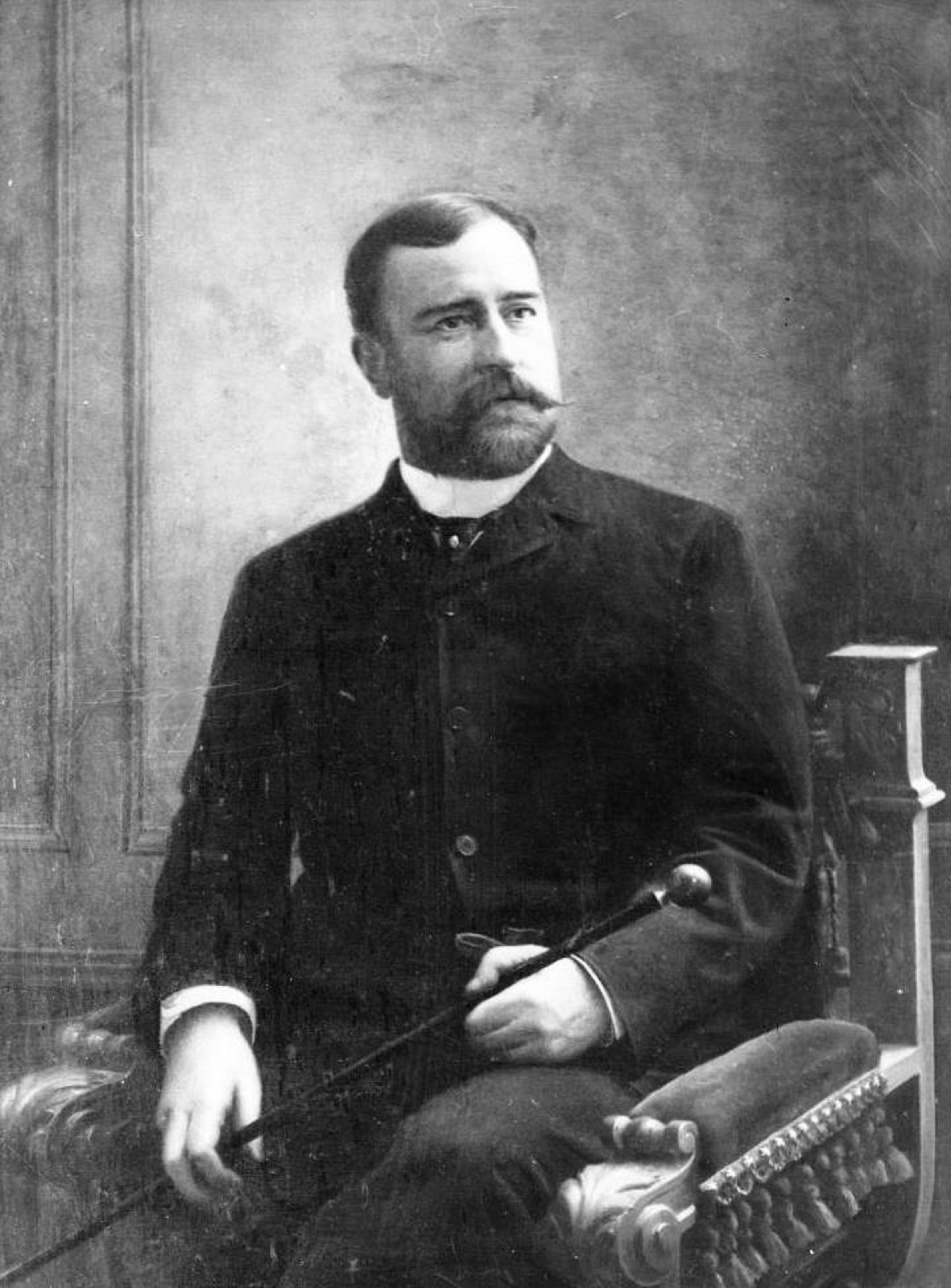

Prince of Poggio Suasa
- Tenure: 1886–1899
- Predecessor: None
- Successor: Prince Mario Ruspoli
- Born: December 30, 1837; Rome, Papal States
- Died: 29 November 1899 (aged 61); Rome, Kingdom of Italy
- Spouse: Princess Ecaterina Conachi (m. 1864; died 1870) Laura Caracciolo (m. 1878; died 1882) Josephine Mary Beers-Curtis (m. 1885)
- Issue: Prince Costantino Ruspoli; Prince Eugenio Ruspoli; Prince Mario Ruspoli; Princess Caterina Ruspoli; Princess Margherita Ruspoli; Prince Camillo Ruspoli; Prince Francesco Ruspoli; Princess Vittoria Ruspoli; Prince Eugenio Ruspoli
Names
- Emanuele Francesco Maria dei Principi Ruspoli
- House: Ruspoli
- Father: Prince Bartolomeo Ruspoli
- Mother: Carolina Ratti

Emanuele Francesco Maria dei Principi Ruspoli, 1st Prince of Poggio Suasa (December 30, 1837 – November 29, 1899) was an Italian and a Prince of the Holy Roman Empire who twice served as the mayor of Rome.

== Early life ==
Prince Emanuele, who was born on December 30, 1837, in Rome, was the son of Bartolomeo dei Principi Ruspoli and his wife Donna Carolina Ratti, a member of the Ratti family.

His paternal grandfather was Francesco Ruspoli, 3rd Prince of Cerveteri and second wife Countess Maria Leopoldina von Khevenhüller-Metsch and ancestor of the Line III of the Principi Ruspoli. His great-uncle was Cardinal Bartolomeo Ruspoli.

== Career ==
He was Nobile di Viterbo e di Orvieto, Patrizio Romano and Prince of Holy Roman Empire.

In 1859, Emanuele was volunteer military in the Kingdom of Sardinia and received the Silver Medal of Military Valor. His military grade was officer.

Emanuele was a deputy and senator of the Kingdom of Italy. He was Sindaco of the City of Rome (June 18, 1878 – July 20, 1880 and November 14, 1892 – November 29, 1899).

== Personal life ==
He married firstly in Rome, June 10, 1864 Princess Ecaterina Conachi (Ţigăneşti, Moldavia, April 2, 1829 – of paludism, Genoa, February 22, 1870), a Romanian noblewoman, (former wife of Prince Nicolae Vogoride, Caimacam of Moldavia, and daughter of boyar poet, prose writer and Great Chancellor Costache Conachi and wife Smaranda Negri-Donici), by whom he had five children:

- Don Costantino dei Principi Ruspoli (Rome, January 14, 1865 – Rome, April 29, 1889), unmarried and without issue.
- Eugenio Ruspoli
- Mario Ruspoli, 2nd Prince of Poggio Suasa
- Donna Caterina dei Principi Ruspoli (Ţigăneşti, November 15, 1868 – Bern, August 12, 1912), married in Rome, January 8, 1887 Albert, Comte de la Forest-Divonne (Paris, December 18, 1859 – January 11, 1943), by whom she had a son and a daughter:
- Donna Margherita dei Principi Ruspoli (Genoa, February 7, 1870 – June 5, 1970), married in Rome, June 6, 1889 Walfredo, Conte della Gherardesca, Conte di Donoratico e Castagneto (1865 – 1932), and had issue. Her mother Caterina, died fifteen days after she was born. Margherita was one of the lady-in-waiting to Queen Elena of Italy. Margherita died when she was over a hundred years old.

=== Second marriage ===
He married secondly in Rome, July 14, 1878 Laura Caracciolo dei Principi di Torella, Duchi di Lavello, Marchesi di Bella, daughter of Camillo Caracciolo and wife Countess Anna Ivanovna Loginova, (Turin, September 17, 1854 – of post childbirth complications, Rome, January 16, 1882), by whom he had an only son:

- Camillo Ruspoli, 2nd Prince of Candriano

=== Third marriage ===
He married thirdly in Paris, June 18, 1885 Josephine Mary Beers-Curtis (Paris, January 27, 1861 – 1943), an English American, daughter of Joseph David Beers-Curtis and wife Elizabeth Shipton-Giles, by whom he had three children:

- Francesco Alvaro Maria Giorgio Ruspoli, 1st Duke of Morignano

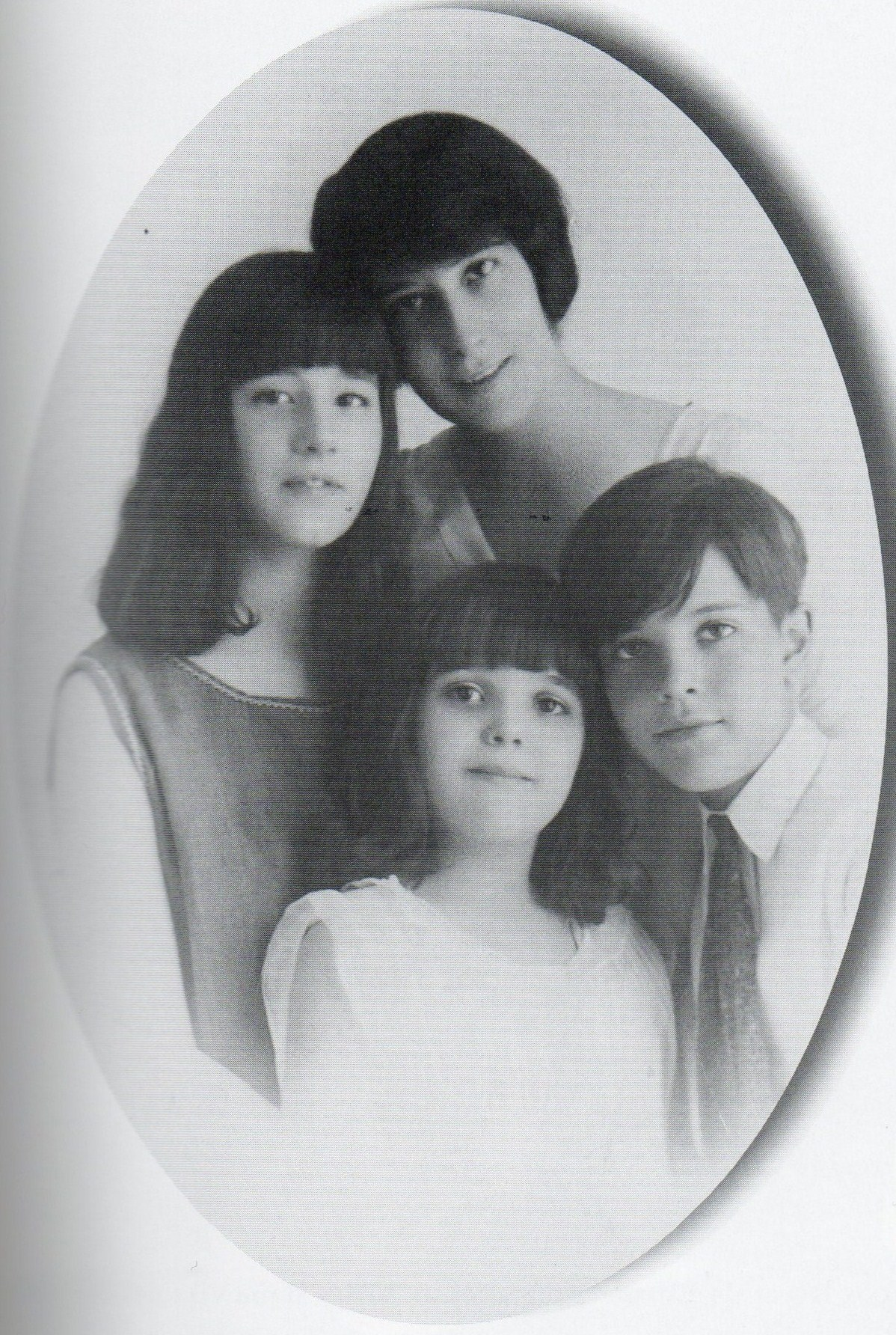
Princess Vittoria Ruspoli with her three children.

- Donna Vittoria Emilia Ipsicratea Agricola dei Principi Ruspoli (Rome, December 31, 1892 – Rome, January 13, 1982), married in Rome, December 4, 1912 and divorced in 1930 Roger Richard Charles Henri Étienne de Dampierre, 2nd Duca di San Lorenzo Nuovo and Nobile di Viterbo (Tours, May 9, 1892 – Chaumont-sur-Tharonne, December 14, 1975), and had two daughters and one son.
- Don Eugenio Mario Giuseppe Bartolomeo dei Principi Ruspoli (Senigallia, July 26, 1894 – Rome, 1978), married in Collesalvetti, January 22, 1927 Mary Dorothea Du Pré-Labouchère (Paris, February 4, 1884 – in domestic accident, Rome, September 27, 1944).

The prince died of complications of his diabetes on November 29, 1899.

=== Descendants ===
Through his daughter Princess Donna Caterina, he was the grandfather of Gilbert, Comte de la Forest-Divonne (Paris, November 4, 1887 – Paris, June 28, 1891), unmarried and without issue, Claire de la Forest-Divonne (Paris, February 11, 1889 – Carquefou, July 14, 1978), married in Livorno, January 15, 1913 Prince Vladimir Mavrocordato, and Gaddo, Conte della Gherardesca (October 10, 1895 – Castagneto Carducci, May 2, 1981), married April 21, 1919 Emilia Poschi-Meuron dei Marchesi Garzoni, and had issue.

Through his daughter, Princess Donna Vittoria, he was the grandfather of Victoire Jeanne Emmanuelle Joséphine Pierre Marie de Dampierre (Rome, November 8, 1913 – Rome, May 3, 2012), married firstly in Rome, March 4, 1935, and divorced in Bucharest, May 6, 1947 (recognized by the Italian courts in Turin, June 3, 1949, but never recognized in Spain, where divorce was forbidden) as her first husband Infante Jaime, Duke of Segovia, and had issue, and secondly in Vienna, November 21, 1949 Antonio Sozzani, without issue, Richard Roger Emmanuel Étienne Pierre de Dampierre, 3rd and last Duca di San Lorenzo Nuovo (Paris, January 13, 1916 – Fleurance, November 30, 2004), married in Biarritz, July 24, 1937 María de las Mercedes de Pedroso y Sturdza, and had issue, and Yolande Beatrix de Dampierre (Rome, July 12, 1918 – Rome, January 29, 1990), married in Rome, January 19, 1940 Luigi, Conte Miani di Angoris, and had issue.

Through his son, Prince Don Eugenio, he was the grandfather of Donna Francesca dei Principi Ruspoli (Varese, July 24, 1925 – 1992), married in Rome, August 6, 1946, and divorced Giulio, Principe Rocco di Torrepadula (Rome, May 21, 1916 – 1987), and had issue.

== Honours ==
- Grand Officer of the Order of Saints Maurice and Lazarus (December 26, 1878)
- Knight Grand Cross of the Order of Saints Maurice and Lazarus (September 3, 1893)
- Knight Grand Cross of the Order of the Crown of Italy
- Silver Medal of Military Valor (1859)
- Commemorative Medal of the Wars of Italian Independence
- Commemorative Medal of the Unity of Italy

== Cultural and charitable interests ==
- Vice president of the Club Alpino Italiano (1873)

== See also ==
- Ruspoli

Italian nobility
Preceded by New creation	1st Prince of Poggio Suasa; 1886–1899	Succeeded by Mario Ruspoli, 2nd Prince of Poggio Suasa
