= Francesco Ruspoli, 3rd Prince of Cerveteri =

Prince of Cerveteri (1752–1829)

Francesco Ruspoli
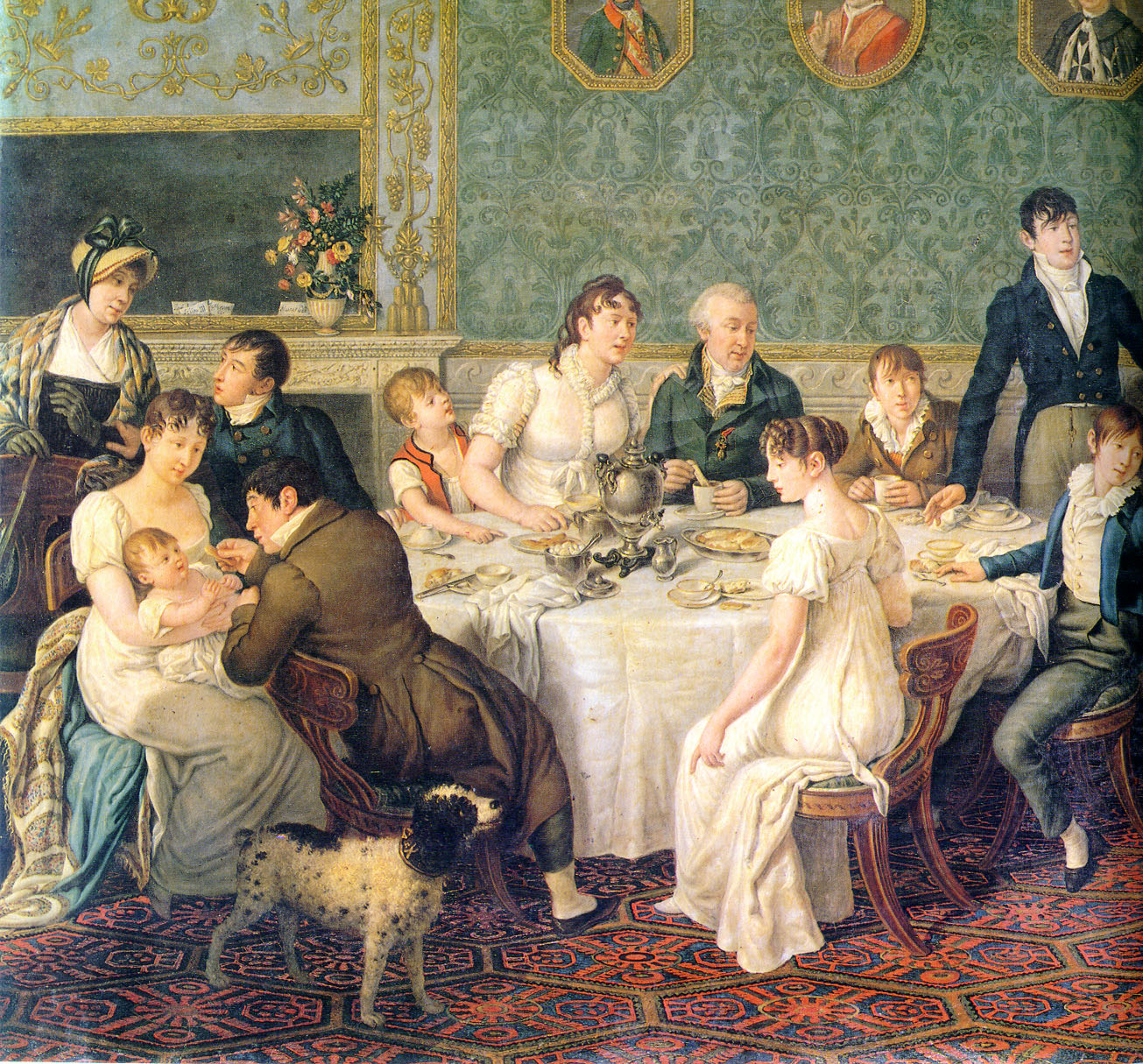
- Prince Francesco´s family in 1807

3rd Prince of Cerveteri
- Tenure: 1779–1829
- Predecessor: Prince Alessandro Ruspoli
- Successor: Prince Alessandro Ruspoli
- Born: February 19, 1752; Rome, Papal States
- Died: March 8, 1829 (aged 77); Rome, Papal States
- Spouse: Princess Maria Isabella Giustiniani Bassano; Countess Maria Leopoldina von Khevenhüller-Metsch
- Issue: Prince Alessandro Ruspoli; Prince Sigismondo Ruspoli; Prince Camillo Ruspoli; Princess Amalia Ruspoli; Prince Leopoldo Ruspoli; Prince Emanuele Ruspoli; Prince Bartolomeo Ruspoli
- House: Ruspoli
- Father: Prince Alessandro Ruspoli
- Mother: Countess Prudenza Marescotti-Capizucchi

Francesco, Prince Ruspoli, 3rd Prince of Cerveteri, 3rd Marquis of Riano, 8th Count of Vignanello (February 19, 1752 – March 8, 1829) was the 3rd Prince of Cerveteri, 3rd Marquis of Riano and 8th Count of Vignanello. He was the son of Alessandro Ruspoli, 2nd Prince of Cerveteri and his second wife and first cousin Prudenza dei Conti Marescotti-Capizucchi. His uncle was Bartolomeo Ruspoli.

In 1792 he was created Prince of the Holy Roman Empire, both he and his male descendants, by the Emperor Francis II.

== Marriages and children ==
He married firstly in 1781 Maria Isabella Giustiniani dei Principi di Bassano (Rome, November 8, 1763 – 1783), without issue.

He married secondly on April 19, 1784 HSH Countess Maria Leopoldina von Khevenhüller-Metsch (August 22, 1764 – February 24, 1845), by whom he had seven children:

- Alessandro Ruspoli, 4th Prince of Cerveteri (ancestor of the Line I of the Princes Ruspoli).
- Don Sigismondo dei Principi Ruspoli (1787 – May 11, 1849), married firstly Faustina, Contessa Tomassini (? – 1832), by whom he had a son, and secondly Paola Bellinzoni (Rome, August 28, 1819 – Rome, March 29, 1892), by whom he had a son:
  - Don Enrico dei Principi Ruspoli (1832 – November 20, 1869), married Emilia de Pasqualis (Athens, September 7, 1834 – ca 1895), and had five children:
    - Don Romolo dei Principi Ruspoli (Rome, July 19, 1850 – September 10, 1912), married in Paris, November 23, 1881, Julie Peynaud (October 20, 1838 – August, 1884), without issue.
    - Don Orazio dei Principi Ruspoli (Rome, December 24, 1852 – ?), unmarried and without issue.
    - Don Sigismondo dei Principi Ruspoli (Rome, June 5, 1854 – 1911), married at Livorno, September 30, 1872, Zelinda Lavagna, without issue.
    - Donna Virginia dei Principi Ruspoli (Rome, May 5, 1855 – 1911), married on April 15, 1878, Giovanni Scaletta.
    - Donna Beatrice dei Principi Ruspoli (Rome, April 29, 1864 – 1911), married on January 8, 1888, in Rome, Filippo Marchese Buccico della Conca, with issue.
  - Don Leopoldo dei Principi Ruspoli (Rome, June 5, 1847 – Genazzano, January 2, 1932), Lieutenant of the Noble Guard. Unmarried and without issue.
- Camillo Ruspoli, Duke of Sueca (ancestor of the Line II of the Princes Ruspoli).
- Donna Amalia dei Principi Ruspoli (July 30, 1790 – 1867), married Vincenzo, Conte Pianciani.
- Don Leopoldo dei Principi Ruspoli (1791 – September 27, 1817), unmarried and without issue.
- Don Emanuele dei Principi Ruspoli (1794–1837), cadetto of the Noble Guard. It was sent on an expedition to Vienna on 9/23/1816 for the Archbishop of Olmutz (Moravia) and Bishop of Gurk (Carinthia), and to Madrid on 10/1/1826 for the Apostolic Nuncio Monsignor Giustiniani. Married Adélaïde Giraud (? – 1835), without issue.
- Bartolomeo Ruspoli and Khevenhüller-Metsch (ancestor of the Line III of the Princes Ruspoli).

== See also ==
- Ruspoli

Italian nobility
Preceded by Alessandro Ruspoli, 2nd Prince of Cerveteri	Prince of Cerveteri; 1779–1829	Succeeded by Alessandro Ruspoli, 4th Prince of Cerveteri
