= Giovanni Nepomucene Ruspoli, 5th Prince of Cerveteri =

Prince of Cerveteri (1807–1876)

Giovanni Ruspoli
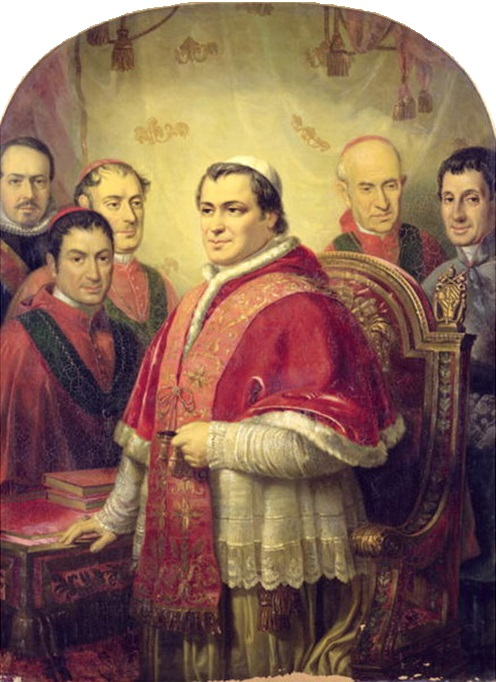
- Prince Giovanni Ruspoli

5th Prince of Cerveteri
- Tenure: 1842–1876
- Predecessor: Prince Alessandro Ruspoli
- Successor: Prince Francesco Ruspoli
- Born: June 28, 1807; Rome, Papal States
- Died: November 6, 1876 (aged 69); Rome, Kingdom of Italy
- Spouse: Princess Barbara Massimo (m. 1832; died 1849)
- Issue: Prince Francesco Ruspoli; Princess Maria Cristina Ruspoli; Prince Alessandro Ruspoli; Princess Francesca Ruspoli
Names
- Giovanni Nepomucene Ruspoli
- House: Ruspoli
- Father: Prince Alessandro Ruspoli
- Mother: Marianna Gräfin Esterházy de Galántha

Giovanni Nepomucene, Principe Ruspoli (June 28, 1807 – November 6, 1876) was the 5th Principe di Cerveteri, 5th Marchese di Riano, 10th Conte di Vignanello, and Prince of the Holy Roman Empire. He was the son of Alessandro Ruspoli, 4th Prince of Cerveteri and his wife Mariana Gräfin Esterházy de Galántha and an ancestor of the Line I of the Principi Ruspoli.

== Marriage and children ==
He married in Rome, May 16, 1832, Barbara dei Principi Massimo (Rome, December 20, 1813 – Rome, November 1, 1849), by whom he had four children:

- Francesco Maria Ruspoli, 6th Prince of Cerveteri.
- Donna Maria Cristina dei Principi Ruspoli (Rome, July 25, 1842 – Rome, February 22/12, 1907), married in Rome, November 25, 1859, HH Napoléon Charles Grégoire Jacques Philippe, Prince Bonaparte (Rome, February 5, 1839 – Rome, February 12/11, 1899), 5th Principe di Canino and 5th Principe di Musignano, granted the style Highness on his marriage, recognized as Principe Romano (Excellency) in 1895, and had female issue.
- Don Alessandro dei Principi Ruspoli, Honorary Marquess of Riano (Rome, April 11, 1844 – Bagni di Lucca, November 3, 1916), Noble Guard. Married in Lucca, October 9, 1877 Eva Capel Broadwood (London, October 28, 1858 – August 2, 1948), and had three sons:
  - Don Fabrizio dei Principi Ruspoli (Rome, December 17, 1878 – Lausanne, November 16, 1935), married in Rome, March 4, 1905 Margery Butt (London, July 3, 1881 – May 29, 1954), and had two daughters:
    - Donna Gabriella dei Principi Ruspoli (Rome, March 4, 1906 –), unmarried and without issue.
    - Donna Cristina dei Principi Ruspoli (Cornigliano Ligure, April 8, 1909 – Rome, February 18, 1949), unmarried and without issue.
  - Don Sforza dei Principi Ruspoli (Rome, June 14, 1882 – Bagni di Lucca, December 27, 1953), married at Bagni di Lucca, July 7, 1923 Giuseppina del Grande (Fribourg, January 16, 1898 – Garmisch, August 16, 1961), and had two sons:
    - Don Alessandro dei Principi Ruspoli (Bagni di Lucca, March 27, 1925 – Florence, March 28, 1981), married in Siena, February 18, 1960 Patrizia Vanni (Florence, April 28, 1942 –), and had an only daughter:
      - Donna Alessandra Giacinta dei Principi Ruspoli (Viareggio, November 5, 1960 –), unmarried and without issue.
    - Don Mario dei Principi Ruspoli (Florence, November 19, 1930 –), married firstly in November, 1964 Dolores Sherwood (?), without issue, and secondly at Zikton, Ohio, March 3, 1978 Lucy Young (June 3, 1952 –), without issue.
  - Don Napoleone dei Principi Ruspoli (Rome, November 24, 1885 – Rome, July 9, 1935), married in New York City, New York, October 14, 1912 Katherine Quay (Sewickley, Pennsylvania, December 19, 18?? – Bagni di Lucca, February, 1956), without issue.
- Donna Francesca dei Principi Ruspoli (Rome, April, 1849 – 1851).

== See also ==
- Ruspoli

Italian nobility
Preceded by Alessandro Ruspoli, 4th Prince of Cerveteri	Prince of Cerveteri; 1842–1876	Succeeded by Francesco Maria Ruspoli, 6th Prince of Cerveteri
