= Alessandro Ruspoli, 4th Prince of Cerveteri =

Prince of Cerveteri (1784–1842)

Alessandro Ruspoli
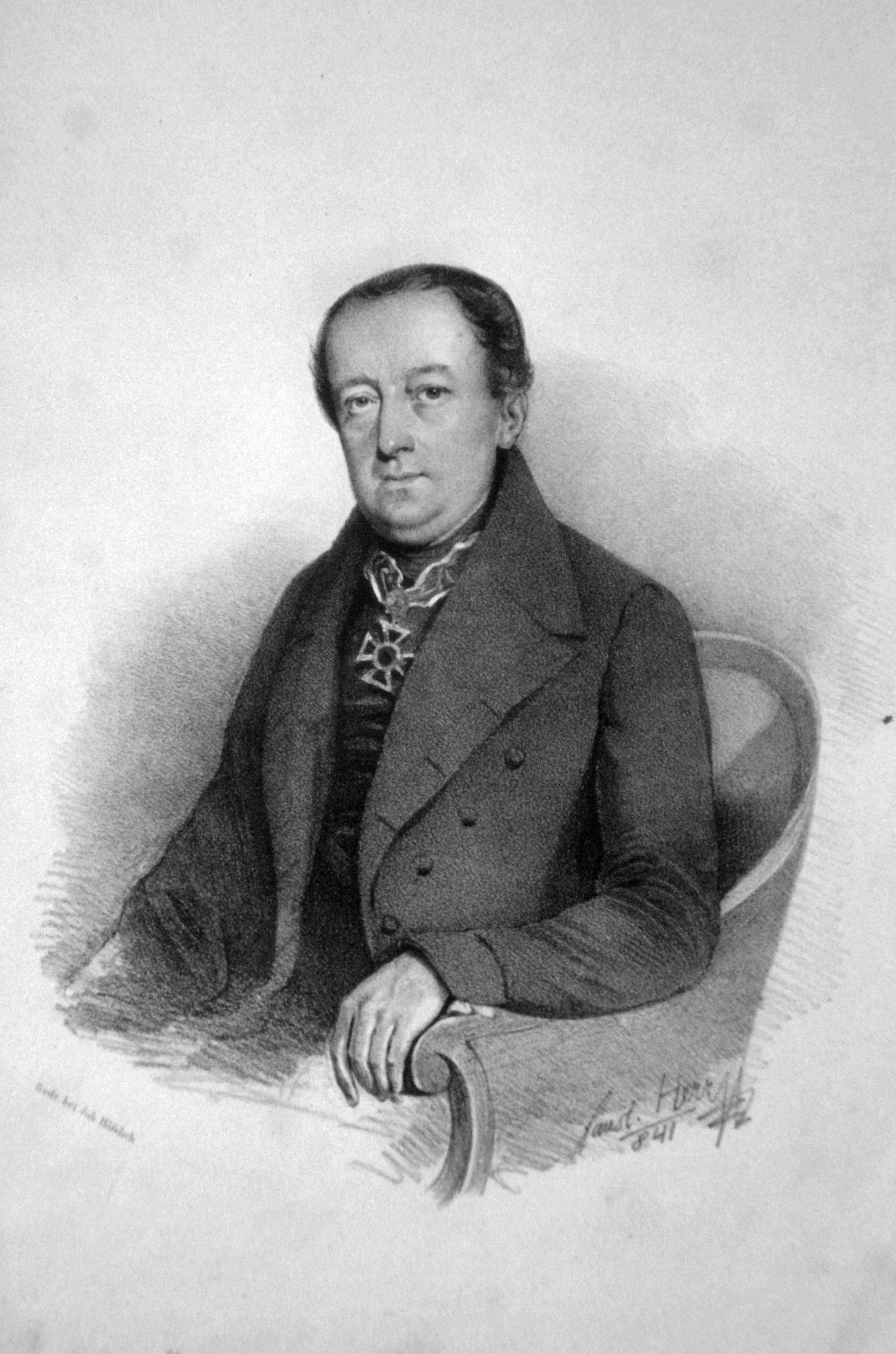
- Prince Alessandro Ruspoli

4th Prince of Cerveteri
- Tenure: 1829–1842
- Predecessor: Prince Francesco Ruspoli
- Successor: Prince Giovanni Ruspoli
- Born: October 5, 1784; Rome, Papal States
- Died: October 31, 1842 (aged 58); Rome, Papal States
- Spouse: Marianna Gräfin Esterházy de Galántha (m. 1805; died 1821)
- Issue: Princess Giovanna Ruspoli; Princess Virginia Ruspoli; Prince Giovanni Ruspoli; Princess Carolina Ruspoli; Prince Amedeo Ruspoli; Prince Luigi Ruspoli; Prince Eugenio Ruspoli; Prince Augusto Ruspoli
- House: Ruspoli
- Father: Prince Francesco Ruspoli
- Mother: Countess Maria Leopoldina von Khevenhüller-Metsch

Alessandro, Principe Ruspoli (October 5, 1784 – October 31, 1842) was the 4th Prince of Cerveteri, 4th Marquis of Riano, 9th Count of Vignanello and Prince of the Holy Roman Empire. He was the son of Francesco Ruspoli, 3rd Prince of Cerveteri and his second wife HSH Leopoldina Gräfin von Khevenhüller-Metsch. He had for brothers, among others, Camillo Ruspoli, Duke of Sueca, and Bartolomeo Ruspoli and Khevenhüller-Metsch. His granduncle was Bartolomeo Ruspoli.

Alessandro is the ancestor of the Line I of the Princes Ruspoli.

== Marriage and children ==
He married in Vienna, June 4, 1805, Marianna Gräfin Esterházy de Galántha (Nagyszeben, January 23, 1786 – December 11, 1821), by whom he had eight children:

- Donna Giovanna dei Principi Ruspoli (June 28, 1806 – April 5, 1830), married on May 21, 1828, Pompeo, Conte di Campello.
- Donna Virginia dei Principi Ruspoli (Rome, June 5, 1807 – April 13, 1878), married on May 19, 1834, Giovanni, Conte Manassei.
- Giovanni Nepomucene Ruspoli, 5th Prince of Cerveteri.
- Donna Carolina dei Principi Ruspoli (July 29, 1809 – April 28, 1873), unmarried and without issue.
- Don Amedeo dei Principi Ruspoli (October 2, 1811 – August 29, 1812), unmarried and without issue.
- Don Luigi dei Principi Ruspoli (September 15, 1813 – July 17, 1887), married on November 25, 1853, Idaline Gräfin von Qualen, without issue.
- Don Eugenio dei Principi Ruspoli (November 1, 1815 – September 14, 1878), Captain of the Noble Guard. He was sent on an expedition to Lisbon on 17-1-1846 to the Patriarch Henriquez de Carvalho. Married on April 9, 1845, Pauline-Thérèse de Sicard (– August 13, 1867), without issue.
- Don Augusto dei Principi Ruspoli, Honorary Principe di Cerveteri (Vignanello, June 6, 1817 – Rome, July 2, 1882), married at Pozsony/Pressburg, June 6, 1846, his first cousin Agnes Gräfin Esterházy de Galántha (Nagyszeben, February 19, 1818 – Terni, August 5, 1899), and had three sons:
  - Don Galeazzo dei Principi Ruspoli (Vignanello, June 4, 1847 – Rome, February 4, 1927), married in Rome, November 26, 1885, Angelica Frascara (Alessandria, February 17, 1861 – October 15, 1906), and had a son and a daughter:
    - Don Alfonso dei Principi Ruspoli (Rome, June 13, 1887 – Rome, April 8, 1964), unmarried and without issue.
    - Donna Maria dei Principi Ruspoli (Rome, February 11, 1889 – Florence, July 6, 1937), married in Rome, April 23, 1914, Giulio Barbolani dei Conti di Montauto (Florence, August 13, 1876 – August 12, 1950).
  - Don Alfonso dei Principi Ruspoli (November 5, 1849 – February 11, 1885), unmarried and without issue.
  - Don Mario dei Principi Ruspoli (September 4, 1855 – San Remo, February 29, 1888), married at Albano, October 25, 1879, as her first husband Costanza Boncompagni-Ludovisi-Ottoboni (Rome, June 28, 1858 – November 11, 1904), and had a son and a daughter:
    - Augusto Ruspoli, 11th Duke of Fiano.
    - Donna Luisa dei Principi Ruspoli (Rome, May 28, 1885 – Rome, October 15, 1893).

== See also ==
- Ruspoli

Italian nobility
Preceded by Francesco Ruspoli, 3rd Prince of Cerveteri	Prince of Cerveteri; 1829–1842	Succeeded by Giovanni Nepomucene Ruspoli, 5th Prince of Cerveteri
