= Ruspoli Regiment =

The Ruspoli Regiment.

The Ruspoli Regiment was an infantry regiment created in 1708 by Francesco Maria Ruspoli, Marquis of Cerveteri, at his own expense. The regiment was in the service of the Holy See.

The recruitment took place in Vignanello. The Notification promised a payment of fair pay, and within a short time about one thousand men signed up. The good doctor Nicola Gamba put through medical and most of them were declared fit to serve. The recruits were given board and lodging; they were then trained to the use of weapons by drill-officers. The young Bartolomeo Ruspoli was nominated colonel.

== Edict of July 6, 1708 ==
Havendo la Santità di Nostro Signore Papa Clemente XI gradita la leva fatta con molta generosità a proprie spese dal Sign. Marchese Francesco Maria Ruspoli d'un Reggimento di Fanteria et approvata la nomina fatta in persona di Lei Sign. Marchese Bartolomeo di lui figlio pro colonello; con tutti gl'onori pesi, facoltà et emolumenti stabili nella Congregazione Militare, ha comandato che se ne facci paricolare dichiarazione col presente viglietto. In Fede.
Datum in Roma questo dì 6 luglio 1708
Cardinal Bentivoglio Comm. Generale
Quintiliano Valenti Comm."

The actual command of the troops was delegated to a French officer, Guisnel de Roux, with the rank of lieutenant colonel.

== Battle of Ferrara ==
After defending the cities of Pesaro and Fano where before the arrival of the regiment "the Germans were raiding, sacking the country around Imola, terrorising the inhabitants", the regiment assured the defence of the Gola del Furlo with cannons and artillery, preventing all enemy passage.

On January 2, 1709 the order from Rome was for the regiment to move to Ferrara, which was in isolation but where a large arsenal was held. The regiment crossed region of Romagna where the crowd rejoiced and welcomed the regiment as the Pope's army. In reality it was the Ruspoli Regiment alone, but reinforced by riflemen from the garrisons of Cesena, Forlì and Faenza: all together no more than one thousand men, but enough to make some enemy troops retreat encountered along the way.

The Austrians, who acted undisturbed until then, regrouped around Comacchio, but when they realized the papal army was heading straight for Ferrara, decided to concentrate all reinforcements at Pontelagoscuro, south of the River Po and north of Ferrara.

On January 12, Ferrara opened its gates to the Ruspoli Regiment. The House of Este had left Ferrara over a century before and the city had a pontifical governor and part of the d'Este Army. The enemy had regrouped a few miles north in Pontelagoscuro, and was two thousand strong and growing rapidly.

Though the Ruspoli Regiment had fewer men, they possessed strong artillery which the Austrian lacked. But they needed to act quickly before the enemy could fortify and organize itself.

With the help of the d'Este Army the Ruspoli Regiment moved north with 16 cannons and assured a constant transportation of ammunition and started a continuous shelling from dawn until dusk. A few days later the Austrians retreated north of the Po river.

The States of the Church were freed from the invaders and the Ruspoli Regiment was covered in glory. On February 3, 1709, Pope Clement XI, full of gratitude, elevated Cerveteri to a Principality.

In the years that followed the regiment was reduced in number and incorporated with the Guards of His Holiness still maintaining the Ruspoli coat of arms on the flag and drums.
