= Francesco Maria Marescotti Ruspoli, 1st Prince of Cerveteri =

Prince of Cerveteri (1672–1731)

Francesco Marescotti Ruspoli
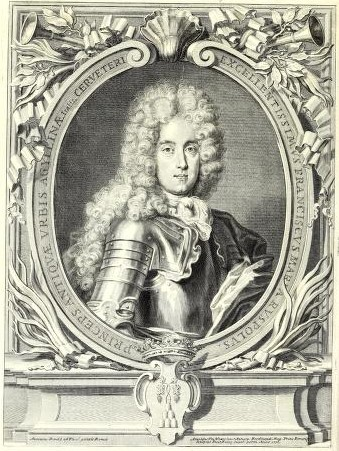
- Prince Francesco Ruspoli by Arnold van Westerhout

1st Prince of Cerveteri
- Tenure: 1709–1731
- Predecessor: None
- Successor: Prince Alessandro Ruspoli
- Born: March 5, 1672; Rome, Papal States
- Died: July 14, 1731 (aged 59); Rome, Papal States
- Spouse: Isabella Cesi dei Duchi di Acquasparta
- Issue: Princess Isabella Ruspoli; Bartolomeo Cardinal dei Principi Ruspoli; Princess Giacinta Marescotti Ruspoli; Princess Vittoria Ruspoli; Princess Teresa Ruspoli; Princess Anna Ruspoli; Alessandro Ruspoli, 2nd Prince of Cerveteri
Names
- Francesco Maria Marescotti Ruspoli
- House: Ruspoli
- Father: Alessandro Ruspoli, 5th Conte di Vignanello
- Mother: Anna Maria dei Marchesi di Corsini

Don Francesco Maria Marescotti, Principe Ruspoli (March 5, 1672 – July 14, 1731) was the 6th Count of Vignanello and Parrano and 1st Prince of Cerveteri.

He was a son of Alessandro Ruspoli, 5th Count of Vignanello and his first wife Anna Maria dei Marchesi Corsini.

Also he was a paternal grandson of Sforza Vicino Marescotti, 4th Conte di Vignanello and his wife Vittoria dei Principi Ruspoli dei Marchesi di Cerveteri (? – Rome, February 11, 1681).

His son was Bartolomeo Ruspoli.

In 1709, Pope Clement XI conferred on him the noble title of Principe di Cerveteri (Prince of Cerveteri), for himself and his descendants, this for donating the Ruspoli Regiment in the War of Comacchio against Austria.

== Marriage and children ==
He married Isabella Cesi dei Duchi di Acquasparta (1676 – November 10, 1753), maternal niece of Pope Innocent XIII, by whom he had nine children:

- Donna Isabella dei Principi Ruspoli (September 15, 1696 – ?), unmarried and without issue
- Bartolomeo Ruspoli
- Donna Giacinta Marescotti dei Principi Ruspoli (Rome, February 16, 1699 – Rome, November 14, 1757), married in 1718 Ferdinando Bernualdo Filippo Orsini, 5th Principe di Solofra and 14th Duca di Gravina (1685 – ?), and had issue
- Donna Vittoria dei Principi Ruspoli (May 17, 1700 – 1743), married Stefano Conti, ?th Duca di Poli and ?th Duca di Guadagnolo (? – 1763)
- Donna Margherita dei Principi Ruspoli (August 13, 1703 – ?), twin with her sister below, unmarried and without issue
- Donna Teresa dei Principi Ruspoli (August 13, 1703 – ?), twin with her sister above, unmarried and without issue
- Donna Anna dei Principi Ruspoli (October 18, 1704 – bef 1735), married in 1730 Agostino Chigi della Rovere, ?th Principe di Farnese (1710–1769)
- Donna Maria Angelica dei Principi Ruspoli (1707 – February 21, 1766), married on October 31, 1734 Girolamo Vincenzo IV Giustiniani, 4th Principe di Bassano and ?th Duca di Corbara (1714 – ?), and had issue
- Alessandro Ruspoli, 2nd Prince of Cerveteri

== See also ==
- Ruspoli.

Italian nobility
Preceded by New Creation	Prince of Cerveteri; 1709–1731	Succeeded by Alessandro Ruspoli, 2nd Prince of Cerveteri
