= Francesco Maria Ruspoli, 6th Prince of Cerveteri =

Prince of Cerveteri (1839–1907)

Francesco Ruspoli

6th Prince of Cerveteri
- Tenure: 1876–1907
- Predecessor: Prince Giovanni Ruspoli
- Successor: Prince Alessandro Ruspoli
- Born: November 30, 1839; Rome, Papal States
- Died: January 23, 1907 (aged 67); Rome, Kingdom of Italy
- Spouse: Countess Egle Franchesi (m. 1868)
- Issue: Prince Alessandro Ruspoli; Prince Giovanni Nepomuceno Ruspoli; Princess Laura Ruspoli; Princess Maria Ruspoli; Princess Giacinta Ruspoli
Names
- Francesco Maria Ruspoli
- House: Ruspoli
- Father: Prince Giovanni Ruspoli
- Mother: Princess Barbara Massimo

Francesco Maria, Principe Ruspoli (November 30, 1839 – January 23, 1907) was the 6th Principe di Cerveteri, 6th Marchese di Riano, 11th Conte di Vignanello and Prince of the Holy Roman Empire, son of Giovanni Nepomucene Ruspoli, 5th Prince of Cerveteri and wife Barbara dei Principi Massimo.

== Marriage and children ==
He married in Pisa, April 20, 1868 Egle dei Conti Franceschi (Pisa, December 23, 1846 – Rome, February 28, 1913), by whom he had five children:

- Alessandro Ruspoli, 7th Prince of Cerveteri
- Don Giovanni Nepomuceno dei Principi Ruspoli (Rome, May 18, 1871 – Rome, June 12, 1955), unmarried and without issue
- Donna Laura dei Principi Ruspoli (Rome, August 14, 1878 – Rome, September 13, 1960), married in Rome, August 24, 1899 Alessandro, Conte Martini-Marescotti (Pisa, August 12, 1871 – Rome, January 6, 1941), and had issue
- Donna Maria dei Principi Ruspoli (Rome, January 21, 1874 – Rome, February 15, 1929), unmarried and without issue
- Donna Giacinta dei Principi Ruspoli (Rome, August 17, 1883 – Rome, April 4, 1909), unmarried and without issue

== See also ==
- Ruspoli

Italian nobility
Preceded by Giovanni Nepomucene Ruspoli, 5th Prince of Cerveteri	Prince of Cerveteri; 1876–1907	Succeeded by Alessandro Ruspoli, 7th Prince of Cerveteri
