= Hyacintha Mariscotti =

Religious Sister of the Franciscan Third Order Regular and saint

Saint Hyacintha Mariscotti, T.O.R.
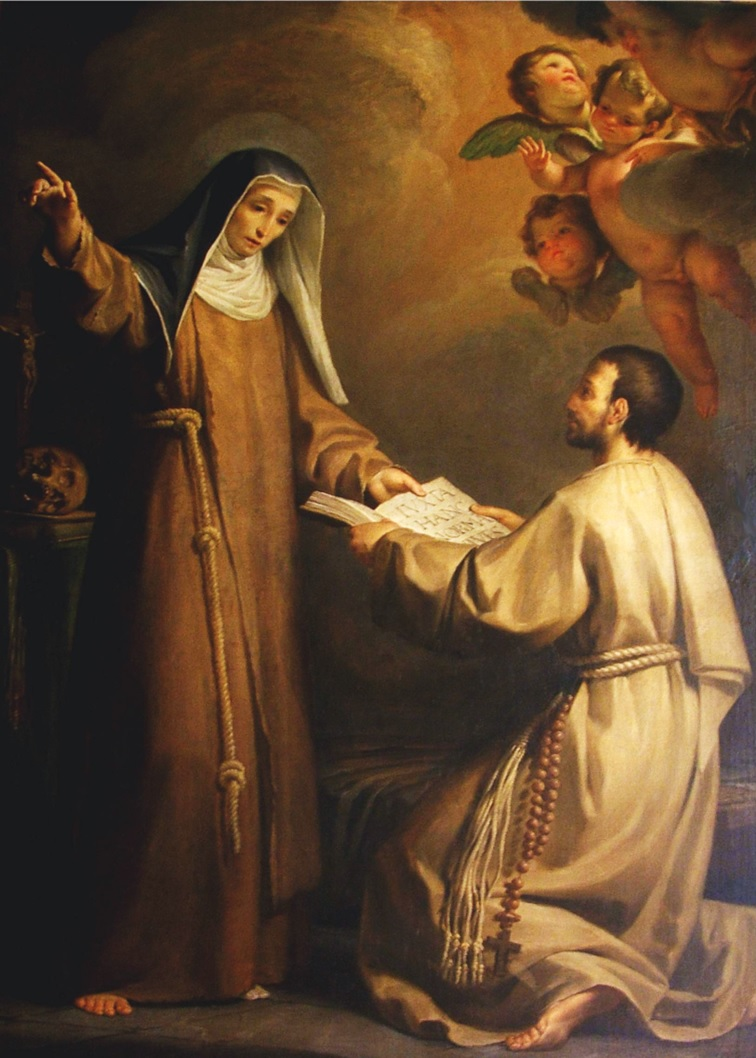

Virgin
- Born: Clarice di Mariscotti; 16 March 1585; Vignanello, Viterbo, Papal States
- Died: 30 January 1640 (aged 54); Viterbo, Papal States
- Venerated in: Catholic Church (Third Order of St. Francis)
- Beatified: 1726, Rome, Papal States by Pope Benedict XIII
- Canonized: 14 May 1807, Rome, Papal States by Pope Pius VII
- Major shrine: Church of Santa Giacinta Marescotti, Viterbo, Italy
- Feast: 30 January

Hyacintha Mariscotti, T.O.R., or Hyacintha of Mariscotti (Italian: Giacinta Marescotti), was an Italian religious sister of the Third Order Regular of St. Francis. She was born in 1585 of a noble family at Vignanello, in the Province of Viterbo, and died 30 January 1640 in Viterbo, noted for the depth of her spiritual gifts. She is honored as a saint in the Catholic Church.

== Life ==
At baptism she received the name Clarice. Her parents were the Count Marcantonio Marescotti, who claimed descent from one Marius Scotus, a military leader under the Emperor Charlemagne, and Countess Ottavia Orsini, whose father had built the noted Gardens of Bomarzo.

At an early age she and her sisters, Ginevra and Ortensia, were sent to the Monastery of St. Bernardino to be educated by the community of the sisters of the Franciscan Third Order Regular. When their studies were complete, her older sister, Ginevra, chose to enter the monastic community as a sister, and received the religious name Immacolata. In her early youth, Clarice had been noted for her piety, but, as she grew older, she became frivolous, which not even an almost-miraculous saving of her life at the age of 17 could change, nor her education at the monastery.

At the age of 20 Clarice set her heart upon marriage with the Marchese Capizucchi, but was passed over by him in favor of her younger sister, Ortensia. Disappointed, she entered the monastery in Viterbo where she had been educated, receiving the religious name Hyacintha. She admitted later that she did this only to hide her chagrin and not to give up the luxuries of the world. She kept a private stock of extra food, wore a habit of the finest material, and received and paid visits at will.

For ten years, Hyacintha kept up this life, contrary to the spirit of her vows, but at the same time, retained a strong religious faith and was regular in her following of the daily routine of the monastery life, with a tender devotion to the Virgin Mary. At that point, due to a severe illness, the priest who served as the confessor to the monastery went to her cell to bring her Holy Communion. Shocked by the display of luxuries he saw there, he admonished her to a closer observance of the way of life to which she had committed herself.

Hyacintha completely changed her life. She gave away her costly garments, wore an old tunic, went barefoot, frequently fasted on bread and water, and chastised her body by vigils. During the outbreak of a plague in the city, she became noted for her devotion in nursing the sick.

Hyacintha went on to establish two confraternities, whose members were called Oblates of Mary or "Sacconi". One of these, similar to the Society of St. Vincent de Paul, gathered alms for the convalescent, for the poor who were ashamed to beg, and for the care of prisoners; the other procured homes for the aged.

By the time of her death, Hyacintha's reputation for holiness was so great, that, at her wake, her religious habit had to be replaced three times. This was due to pieces of it being snipped off by the people to keep as a relic.

== Veneration ==
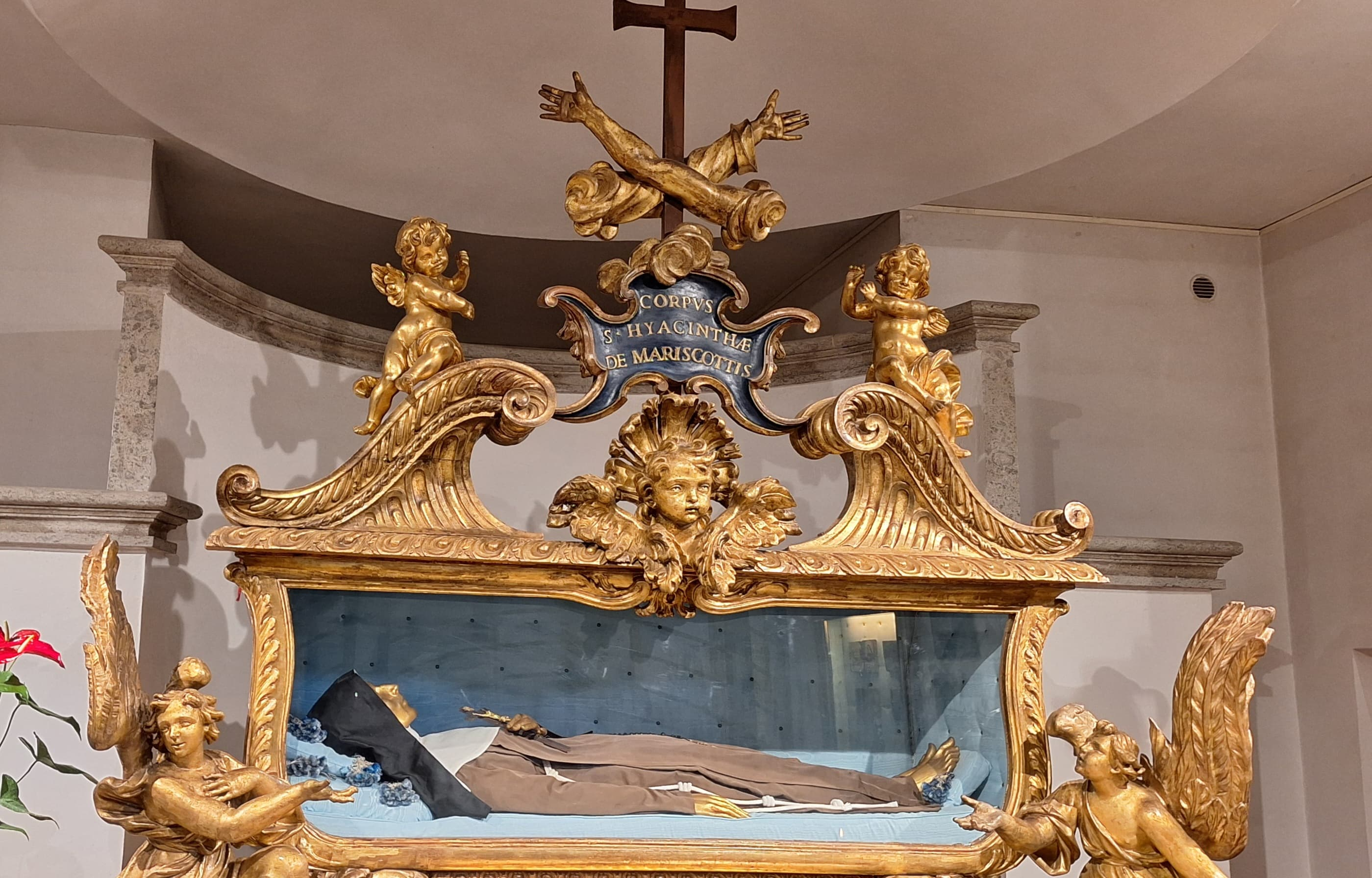
Tomb with the body of Saint Hyacintha Mariscotti exposed for public veneration in Viterbo, Italy

Hyacintha was beatified by Pope Benedict XIII in 1726, and canonized on 14 May 1807 by Pope Pius VII. Today her remains are preserved for veneration in the church of her now-defunct monastery, which today bears her name. Hyacintha's feast day is celebrated on 30 January.

== See also ==
- Saint Hyacintha Mariscotti, patron saint archive
