= Bartolomeo Ruspoli and Khevenhüller-Metsch =

Italian aristocrat

Bartolomeo Ruspoli and Khevenhüller-Mestch
- Prince Bartolomeo Ruspoli.
- Born: October 26, 1800; Rome, Papal States
- Died: 1872 (aged 71–72); Rome, Kingdom of Italy
- Spouse: Carolina Ratti
- Issue: Princess Francesca Ruspoli; Princess Giacinta Ruspoli; Prince Paolo Ruspoli; Prince Emanuele Ruspoli; Prince Luigi Ruspoli; Princess Leopolda Ruspoli; Princess Clelia Ruspoli; Princess Ortensia Ruspoli
- Bartolomeo dei Principi Ruspoli
- House: Ruspoli
- Father: Prince Francesco Ruspoli
- Mother: Countess Maria Leopoldina von Khevenhüller-Metsch

Bartolomeo Ruspoli and Khevenhüller-Metsch, dei principi Ruspoli (October 26, 1800–1872) was an Italian aristocrat, Prince of the Holy Roman Empire. He is the ancestor of the 3rd Line of the Princes Ruspoli, The Princes of Poggio-Suasa.

== Early life ==
He was a younger son of Francesco Ruspoli, 3rd Prince of Cerveteri and, his second wife, Countess Maria Leopoldina von Khevenhüller-Metsch (a daughter of Johann, 2nd Prince of Khevenhüller-Metsch). He had four brothers, among others, Alessandro Ruspoli, 4th Prince of Cerveteri, and Camillo Ruspoli, Duke of Sueca.

== Career ==
He was colonel of the Piedmontese army, in which he participates in the wars of the Italian resurgence. Paralyzed from below waist by the blast of a grenade, he continued to participate in wheelchair battles pushed by his assistant.

== Personal life ==
Ruspoli was married to Carolina Ratti. Together, they were the parents of:

- Princess Francesca Ruspoli
- Princess Giacinta Ruspoli
- Prince Paolo Ruspoli
- Prince Emanuele Ruspoli (1837–1899), who was named 1st Prince of Poggio-Suasa after participating in the Italian unification and being the first Mayor of the Italian Rome.
- Prince Luigi Ruspoli
- Princess Leopolda Ruspoli
- Princess Clelia Ruspoli
- Princess Ortensia Ruspoli

=== Descendants ===
Through his son Prince Emanuele, he was the great-grandfather of Donna Emanuella de Dampierre Ruspoli, Duchess of Segovia and Duchess of Anjou by her marriage to Infante Don Jaime, son of Alfonso XIII of Spain.

== See also ==
- Ruspoli
