= Camillo Ruspoli, Duke of Sueca =

Camillo Ruspoli
- Duke of Sueca
- Born: March 20, 1788; Rome, Papal States
- Died: July 30, 1864 (aged 76); Florence, Kingdom of Italy
- Spouse: Carlota Godoy and Bourbon
- Issue: Prince Adolfo Ruspoli; Prince Luigi Ruspoli
Names
- Camillo Ruspoli and Khevenhüller-Mestch
- House: Ruspoli
- Father: Prince Francesco Ruspoli
- Mother: Countess Maria Leopoldina von Khevenhüller-Metsch

Camilo Ruspoli y Khevenhüller-Mestch, dei principi Ruspoli, Duke of Sueca and Prince of the Holy Roman Empire, (20 March 1788 – 30 July 1864) was an Italian aristocrat, son-in-law of Manuel Godoy.

== Biography ==
He was born in Rome on 20 March 1788, the third son of Francesco Ruspoli, 3rd Prince of Cerveteri, and his Austrian wife, Countess Maria Leopoldina Khevenhüller-Metsch. He had four brothers, among others, Alessandro Ruspoli, 4th Prince of Cerveteri, and Bartolomeo Ruspoli and Khevenhüller-Metsch.

Camilo was by his own right a Roman prince. And by his marriage with Carlota Luisa de Godoy and Bourbon he showed the titles of Duke of Sueca, Count of Chinchón (both with greatness of Spain), Marquess of Boadilla del Monte and Count of Evoramonte (Portuguese), authorised by the Kings of Spain to use his wife's titles.

He also was Chief of Squadron of the Dragoon Regiment of Pope Leo XII, Knight of Justice of the Order of St. John of Jerusalem, Maestrante de Granada, Grand Cross of the Order of Charles III, Gentleman of the Chamber of the Emperor of Austria.

Camillo is the ancestor of the Line II of the Princes Ruspoli.

== Marriage and children ==
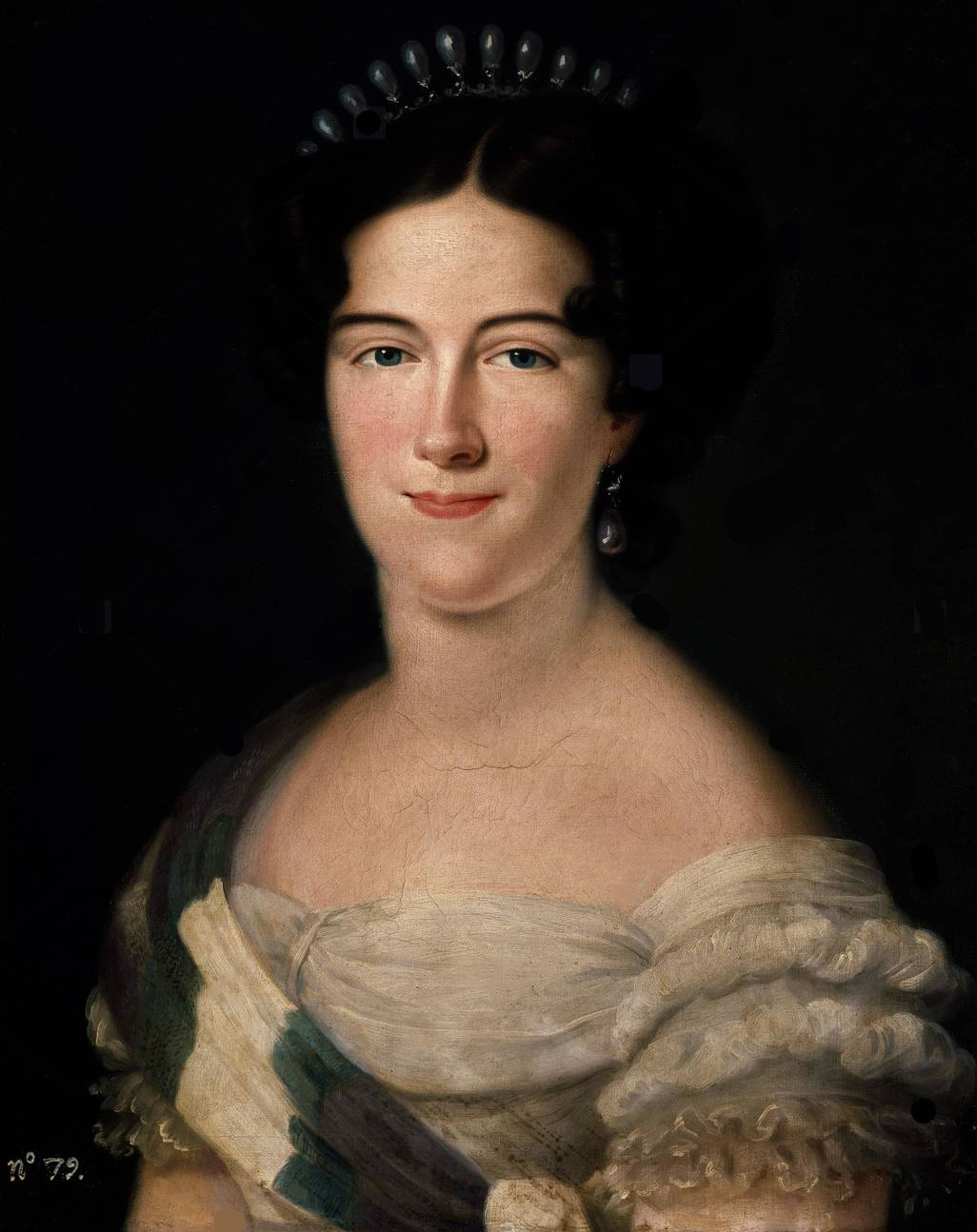
Carlota of Godoy and Bourbon, Duchess of Sueca

He married in Rome on November 8, 1821 with Carlota Luisa de Godoy and Bourbon,(Madrid, October 7, 1800 – Paris, May 13, 1886), II Duchess of Sueca (Letter of July 18, 1830), XVI Countess of Chinchón (Letter of 1831), twice grandee of Spain (Royal Cedule of March 14, 1831), I marchioness of Boadilla del Monte, daughter of Manuel Godoy and Alvarez de Faria, Prince of Peace, I Duke of Alcudia and Sueca, both with greatness, I Baron of Mascalbó, I Prince of Bassano (Pontifical) and I Count of Evoramonte (Portuguese), and of Maria Teresa of Bourbon and Vallabriga, his first wife, Countess of Chinchón and Boadilla del Monte.

This marriage was authorized by the king Ferdinand VII, second cousin of Carlota, and had two sons:

- Adolfo Ruspoli, 2nd Duke of Alcudia
- Luigi Ruspoli, 3rd Marquis of Boadilla del Monte.

After the Duke and Duchess of Sueca were married, they "lived in great splendor in Rome."

== See also ==
- Ruspoli
