= Adolfo Ruspoli, 2nd Duke of Alcudia =

Adolfo Ruspoli y Godoy

3rd Duke of Alcudia
- Tenure: 1851–1914
- Predecessor: Manuel de Godoy y Álvarez de Faria
- Successor: Prince Carlos Ruspoli
- Born: December 28, 1822; Bordeaux, Kingdom of France
- Died: February 4, 1914 (aged 91); Paris, France
- Spouse: Rosalía Álvarez de Toledo y Silva-Bazán
- Issue: Prince Carlos Ruspoli; Prince Joaquín Ruspoli; Prince José Ruspoli; Princess María Teresa Ruspoli; Prince Camilo Ignacio Ruspoli
Names
- Adolfo Ruspoli y Godoy
- House: Ruspoli
- Father: Prince Camillo Ruspoli
- Mother: Carlota Godoy and Bourbon

Don Adolfo Ruspoli y Godoy (di Bassano), de Khevenhüller-Metsch y Borbón, dei Principi Ruspoli (December 28, 1822 – February 4, 1914) was a Spanish aristocrat, son of the prince Camillo Ruspoli and wife Carlota de Godoy y Borbón, 2nd Duchess of Sueca.

He was 2nd Duke of Alcudia, Grandee of Spain First Class, with a Coat of Arms of de Godoy in succession of his maternal grandfather (Letter of February 18, 1853) and 3rd Count of Évoramonte in Portugal Portugal de Juro e Herdade with Honours of Relative, Maestrante of Granada, Gentleman of the Chamber of Her Catholic Majesty with exercise and service, Senator of the Realm, etc. And Prince of the Holy Roman Empire.

== Marriage and children ==
He married in Madrid, May 11, 1857 Doña Rosalía Álvarez de Toledo y Silva-Bazán, de Palafox-Portocarrero y Téllez-Girón (Naples, January 21/2, 1833 – Lucca, July/June 11, 1865), daughter of Don Pedro de Alcántara Álvarez de Toledo y Palafox, Gonzaga y Portocarrero, 17th Duke of Medina-Sidonia, Marquiss of Villafranca del Vierzo, 13th Marquis of Los Vélez, 2nd Duke of Alcudia, and 21st Count of Niebla, Grandee of Spain First Classe. The first cousin of Eugenia de Montijo (Empress of the French), and wife Doña María del Pilar Joaquina de Silva-Bazán y Téllez-Girón, de Waldstein y Pimentel, of the Marqueses de Santa-Cruz, etc., and had five children:

- Carlos Ruspoli, 3rd Duke of Alcudia and Sueca
- Don Joaquín (Gioachino) Ruspoli y Álvarez de Toledo, de Godoy (di Bassano) y Silva-Bazán, dei Principi Ruspoli (Madrid, September 26, 1859 – 1904), unmarried and without issue
- Don José (Giuseppe) Ruspoli y Álvarez de Toledo, de Godoy (di Bassano) y Silva-Bazán, dei Principi Ruspoli (Madrid, August 21, 1861 – 1948), unmarried and without issue
- Doña María Teresa (Maria Tereza) Ruspoli y Álvarez de Toledo, de Godoy (di Bassano) y Silva-Bazán, dei Principi Ruspoli (Madrid, November 26, 1862/1863 – Paris, March 23, 1958) married in Paris, September 17, 1883 Henri Cognet de Chappuis de Maubou, Comte de Maubou, and had one son and one daughter:
  - Jacques Cognet de Chappuis de Maubou, Vicomte de Maubou, without further notice
  - Guillaumine "Mine" Cognet de Chappuis de Maubou, without further notice
- Don Camilo Ignacio (Camillo Ignacio) Ruspoli y Álvarez de Toledo, de Godoy (di Bassano) y Silva-Bazán, dei Principi Ruspoli (Pau, January 31, 1865 – Madrid, April 15, 1930)

== See also ==
- Ruspoli

Spanish nobility
Preceded by Manuel Godoy	Duke of Alcudia; 1851–1914	Succeeded by Carlos Ruspoli
