= Augusto Ruspoli, 11th Duke of Fiano =

Augusto Ruspoli

Duke of Fiano
- Reign: 1909–1912
- Predecessor: Marco Boncompagni Ludovisi Ottoboni
- Successor: Cesare Ottoboni
- Born: September 8, 1880; Rome, Kingdom of Italy
- Died: 1912; Rome, Kingdom of Italy
- Augusto Ruspoli
- House: Ruspoli
- Father: Prince Mario Ruspoli
- Mother: Costanza Boncompagni-Ludovisi-Ottoboni
- Religion: Roman Catholic Church

Augusto Ruspoli-Ottoboni, dei Principi Ruspoli (Rome, September 8, 1880 – Rome, 1912), was an Italian aristocrat and son of Mario Ruspoli and Costanza Boncompagni-Ludovisi-Ottoboni. Mario was the youngest son of Augusto Ruspoli, who was the youngest son of Alessandro Ruspoli, 4th Prince of Cerveteri. And Costanza was daughter of Marco Boncompagni Ludovisi Ottoboni, 10th Duke of Fiano.

Augusto inherited the title of his maternal grandfather, becoming the 11th Duke of Fiano. He was also Patrizio Romano, Noble of Viterbo and Orvieto and Prince of the Holy Roman Empire.

He died unmarried and without issue and was succeeded in the title by his cousin Cesare Ottoboni.

== See also ==
- Ruspoli

Italian nobility
Preceded by Marco Boncompagni Ludovisi Ottoboni	Duke of Fiano; 1909–1912	Succeeded by Cesare Ottoboni
