= Piccioli =

Piccioli is an Italian surname. Notable people with the surname include:

- Fernandino Maria Piccioli (1821–1900), Italian entomologist
- Gianfranco Piccioli (1944–2022), Italian film director, producer and screenwriter
- Luigi Piccioli (1812–1862), Italian musician and singer
- Pierpaolo Piccioli (born 1967), Italian fashion designer
