= Bartolomeo Ruspoli =

Italian cardinal (1697–1741)

- Cardinal of the Roman Catholic Church
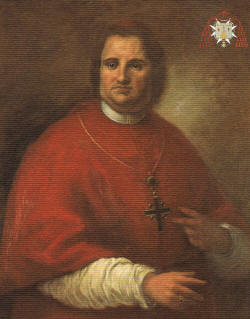
- Other posts: Protonotary Apostolic Governor of the 1721 Conclave; Secretary of the Memorial; Secretary of the Congregation for the Evangelization of Peoples Grand Prior of the Sovereign Military Order of Malta

Orders
- Consecration: by Pope Clement XII
- Created cardinal: 2 October 1730
- Rank: Cardinal of the Roman Catholic Church

Personal details
- Born: 25 October 1697 Rome, Papal States
- Died: 21 May 1741 (aged 43) Rome, Papal States
- Denomination: Roman Catholic
- Parents: Prince Francesco Ruspoli, Isabella Cesi dei Duchi di Acquasparta
- Coat of arms

Bartolomeo dei Principi Ruspoli (25 October 1697 – 21 May 1741) was an Italian Cardinal.

== Titles held ==
He was the son of Prince Francesco Maria Marescotti Ruspoli, 1st Prince of Cerveteri and his wife Isabella Cesi dei Duchi di Acquasparta, a maternal niece of Pope Innocent XIII.

He was a Knight of the Sovereign Military Order of Malta.

A Protonotary Apostolic since 1718, he became governor of the 1721 papal conclave that elected Pope Innocent XIII. His diligence in this task was such that the newly elected Pope appointed him his Secretary of the Memorial that same year.

He was appointed Secretary of the Congregation for the Evangelization of Peoples in 1724.

Ordained Cardinal of the Roman Catholic Church by Pope Clement XII on 2 October 1730 (with the title of Santi Cosma e Damiano from 22 November 1730), he became Gran Priore of the Ordine di San Giovanni di Gerusalemme in 1731.

== Sources ==
- Miranda, Salvador. "RUSPOLI, Bartolomeo (1697-1741)". The Cardinals of the Holy Roman Church. Florida International University. OCLC 53276621.
- Galeazzo Ruspoli, I Ruspoli, Published by Gremese 2001.
