= Riano, Lazio =

Riano
- Comune
- Comune di Riano
- Location within Italy Location within Lazio
- Coordinates: 42°6′N 12°31′E
- Country: Italy
- Region: Lazio
- Metropolitan city: Rome (RM)
- Frazioni: Belvedere, Colle Romano, La Rosta

Government
  - Mayor: Luca Giovanni Attilio Abbruzzetti

Area
  - Total: 25.43 km^{2} (9.82 sq mi)
- Elevation: 125 m (410 ft)

Population (31 October 2017)
  - Total: 10,668
  - Density: 419.5/km^{2} (1,087/sq mi)
- Time zone: UTC+1 (CET)
  - Summer (DST): UTC+2 (CEST)
- Postal code: 00060
- Dialing code: 06
- Patron saint: St. George
- Saint day: April 23
- Website: Official website

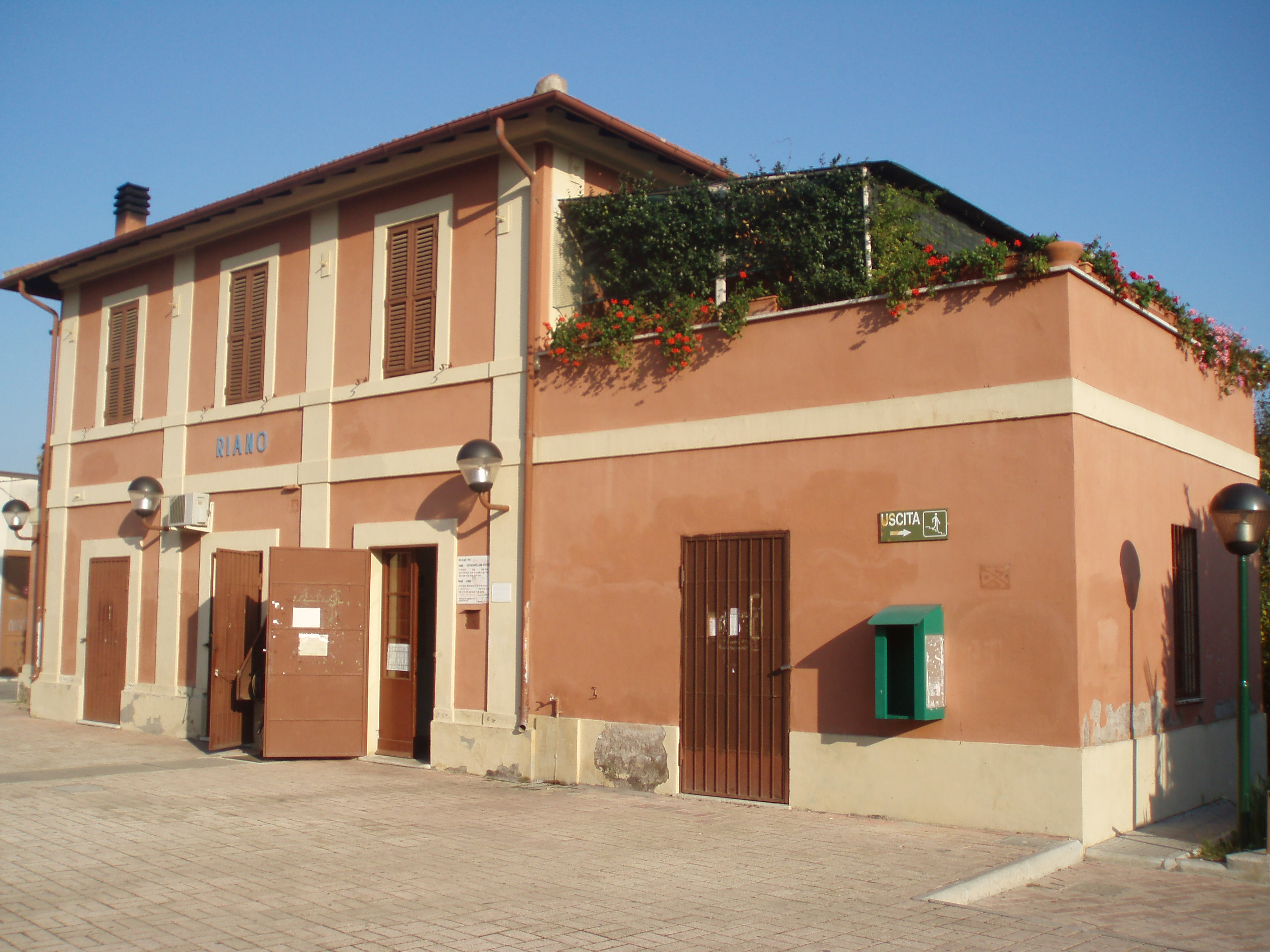
Rome Civita Castellana Viterbo railway. Riano station

Riano is a comune (municipality) in the Metropolitan City of Rome in the Italian region of Latium. It is located about 20 kilometres (12 mi) north of Rome, in the Tiber River valley, not far from Veio.

Riano borders the following municipalities: Castelnuovo di Porto, Monterotondo, Rome, Sacrofano.
