= Vignanello =

- Comune
- Comune di Vignanello
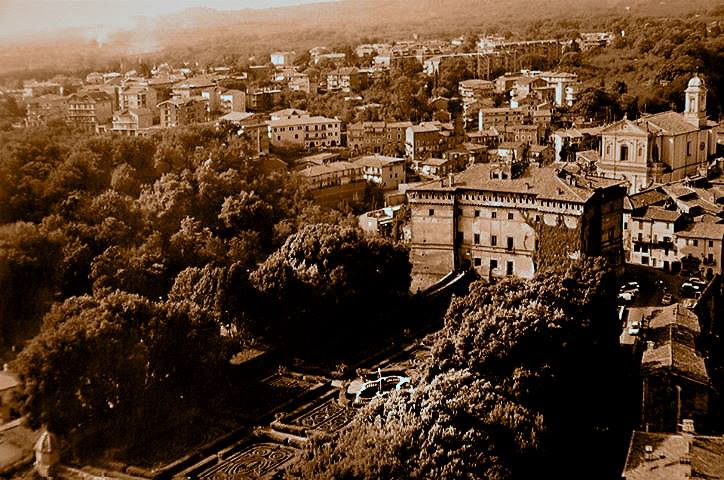

- Location within Italy Location within Lazio
- Coordinates: 42°23′N 12°16′E
- Country: Italy
- Region: Lazio
- Province: Viterbo (VT)

Government
  - Mayor: Vincenzo Grasselli

Area
  - Total: 20.5 km^{2} (7.9 sq mi)
- Elevation: 369 m (1,211 ft)

Population (31 December 2014)
  - Total: 4,724
  - Density: 230/km^{2} (597/sq mi)
- Demonym: Vignanellesi
- Time zone: UTC+1 (CET)
  - Summer (DST): UTC+2 (CEST)
- Postal code: 01039
- Dialing code: 0761
- Website: Official website

Vignanello is a comune (municipality) in the Province of Viterbo in the Italian region of Latium, located about 60 kilometres (37 mi) northwest of Rome and about 14 kilometres (9 mi) southeast of Viterbo.

Vignanello borders the following municipalities: Corchiano, Fabrica di Roma, Gallese, Soriano nel Cimino, Vallerano, Vasanello.

== Main sights ==
- Ruspoli castle
- Collegiate church "Presentation of St. Mary"
