= Duke of Sueca =

Dukedom of Sueca
- Creation date: 7 March 1804
- Created by: Charles IV of Spain
- Peerage: Spanish nobility
- First holder: Manuel Godoy y Alvarez de Faria Rios, 1st Duke of Sueca
- Last holder: Carlos Ruspoli y Morenés
- Present holder: Luis Carlos Ruspoli y Sanchiz
- Heir apparent: Carlos Ruspoli y Alvarez de las Asturias Bohorques, duke of Alcudia
- Remainder to: the 1st Duke's heirs lawfully begotten. For his marriage with the daughter of the Infante don Luis
- Subsidiary titles: Duke of la Alcúdia; Marquess of Boadilla del Monte; Count of Évoramonte; Baron of Mascalbó
- Seat: Palace of Infante don Luis (Boadilla del Monte)

Duke of Sueca is a title of Spanish nobility, Grandee of Spain 1st class. It was created by King Charles IV of Spain in 1804 for Manuel Godoy, who was the Prime Minister of Spain from 1792 to 1797 and from 1801 to 1808. Its name refers to Sueca in the Province of Valencia in Spain.

== Manuel Godoy ==
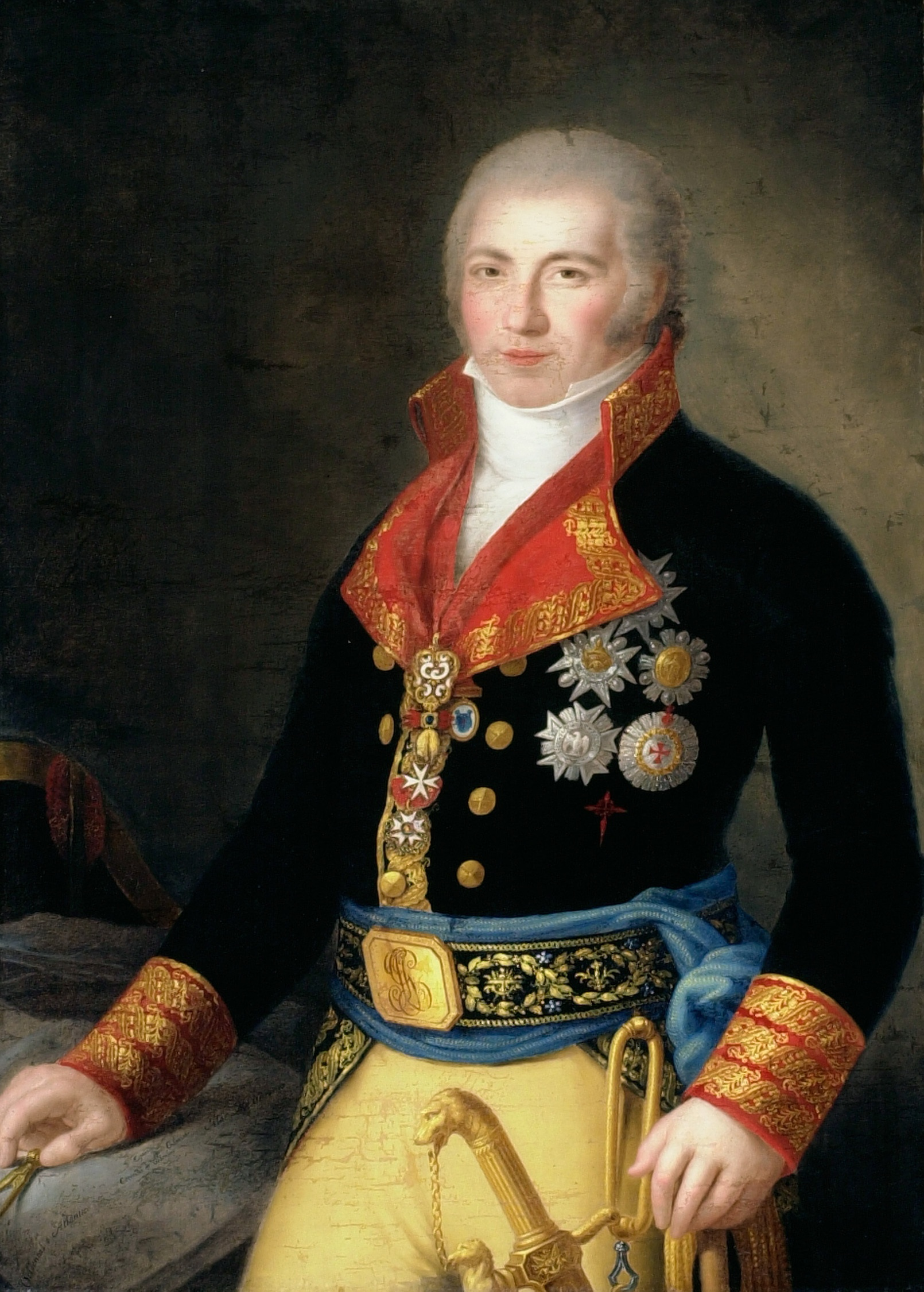
Manuel Godoy, Prince of Peace, Duke of Sueca, Duke of la Alcudia, Count of Évoramonte, Baron of Mascalbó, Prime Minister of Charles IV of Spain

King Charles IV also granted to Manuel Godoy the Duchy of Alcudia, the Barony of Mascalbó and the title of Prince of the Peace. The granting of the latter was an exception in Spanish noble history; since the Middle Ages, no one had held the princely dignity in Spain except the heir of the crown, who did so through three titles: Prince of Asturias, Gerona and of Viana.

He was granted the Portuguese county of Évoramonte, which was due to his marriage to the Countess of Chinchón. However, he was exiled in 1808 when Spain came under Bonaparte rule, and he was not authorized to return to Spain until 1844.

Godoy was also, by papal concession, Prince of Bassano, a title he obtained after acquiring the Italian fief of Bassano di Sutri, located between Rome and Viterbo, during his long exile in Rome.

It seems that he was also "Marqués de Álvarez", as it is named in different documents, although it is a title that was never used by his successors, nor has anyone attempted to rehabilitate it, nor is it stated in the Cast of Greatness and Titles Nobiliarios Españoles or in the Directory of the Diputación de la Grandeza. He was also "Lord of Soto of Rome" and "Viscount of High Andalusia".

== Title holders ==
	Title	Period
Created by Charles IV
I	Manuel Godoy y Álvarez de Faria Rios	1792-1808
II	Carlota Godoy y Borbón	1830-1886
III	Carlos Ruspoli y Álvarez de Toledo	1887-1936
IV	Camilo Carlos Ruspoli y Caro	1940-1975
V	Carlos Oswaldo Ruspoli y Morenés	1975–2016
VI	Luis Carlos Ruspoli y Sanchiz	2018

== History of the dukes ==
I Duke: Manuel Godoy, I Duke of Sueca, I Duke of la Alcúdia and I Baron of Mascalbo. He also received the title of Prince of Peace (which was expropriated by King Ferdinand VII in 1808), Prince of Bassano (pontifical), and I Count of Évoramonte (Portuguese title). He married: Doña María Teresa de Borbón y Vallabriga, XV Countess of Chinchón, who was the eldest daughter of the Cardinal-Infante Don Luis de Borbón y Farnesio. His daughter succeeded him:

II Duke: Carlota Godoy y Bourbon (1800–1886), II Duchess of Sueca, twice gandee of Spain, I marquess of Boadilla del Monte. He married in Rome on November 8, 1821, with Camilo Rúspoli and Khevenhüller-Mestch (1788–1864), Roman prince, son of Francesco Ruspoli, III prince of Cerveteri, and of the countess Maria Leopoldina de Khevenhüller-Metsch. Her son succeeded grandson her:

III Duke: Carlos Rúspoli y Álvarez de Toledo, Godoy y Silva-Bazán (1858–1936), III Duke of Sueca, III Duke of la Alcudia, XVII Count of Chinchón, IV Count of Évoramonte, in Portugal. Grandee of Spain 1st class. He married Carmen Caro and Caro, of the Marquesses of the Romana. His son succeeded him:

IV Duke: Camilo Rúspoli y Caro, Alvarez de Toledo y Caro (1904–1975), who reunites all the titles, both of Manuel Godoy, and of the Infanta Maria Teresa, by which he became the IV Duke of Sueca, IV Duke of la Alcudia, XVIII Count of Chinchón, and VI Marquess of Boadilla del Monte. Grandee of Spain 1st class. He married Belén Morenés and Arteaga, XVIII Countess of Bañares. His son succeeded him:

V Duke: Carlos Rúspoli y Morenés, Caro y Artega (1932–2016), V Duke of Sueca, V Duke of la Alcudia, XIX Count of Chinchón. Grandee of Spain 1st class. Without issue. His nephew succeeded him:

VI Duke: Luis Ruspoli and Sanchiz, Morenés y Nuñez-Robres (1963), VI Duke of Sueca, VI Duke of la Alcudia, XX Count of Chinchón. Grandee of Spain 1st class. VIII Marquis of Boadilla del Monte and III Baron of Mascalbó. He married Maria Alvarez de las Asturias Bohorques and Rumeu, of the Dukes of Gor.

== Family tree ==
Manuel Godoy y Álvarez de Faria Rios, I Duke of Sueca and la Alcudia (1767-1851)
Carlota de Godoy y Borbón, II Duchess of Sueca (1800-1886)
Adolfo Ruspoli y Godoy, II Duke of la Alcudia (1822-1914)
Carlos Ruspoli y Álvarez de Toledo, III Duke of Sueca and Alcudia (1858-1936)
Carlos Ruspoli y Caro, IV Duke of Sueca and Alcudia (1904-1975)
Carlos Ruspoli y Morenés, V Duke of Sueca and Alcudia, XIX Count of Chinchón (1932-2016)	Luis Ruspoli y Morenés, VII Marquis of Boadilla del Monte (1933-2011)
Luis Ruspoli y Sanchiz, VI Duke of Sueca and Alcudia, XX Count of Chinchón (2016)

== See also ==
- List of current grandees of Spain
