= Duke of la Alcudia =

Dukedom of Spain

Dukedom of la Alcudia
- Creation date: 4 July 1792
- Created by: Charles IV of Spain
- Peerage: Spanish nobility
- First holder: Manuel Godoy and Álvarez de Faría Ríos
- Last holder: Luis Carlos Ruspoli y Sanchiz
- Present holder: Carlos Ruspoli y Álvarez de las Asturias Bohorques
- Heir presumptive: Luis Ruspoli y Álvarez de las Asturias Bohorques, Baron of Mascalbó
- Remainder to: the 1st Duke's heirs lawfully begotten. For his marriage with the daughter of the Infante don Luis
- Seat: Palace of Infante don Luis

Duke of la Alcudia (Spanish: Duque de la Alcudia) is a title of Spanish nobility, Grandee of Spain 1st class. It was created by King Charles IV of Spain in 1792 for Manuel Godoy, who was the Prime Minister of Spain from 1792 to 1797 and from 1801 to 1808. Its name refers to the Valle de Alcudia in the Province of Ciudad Real in Spain.

It is used as a waiting title by the first-born of the house of Sueca and Chinchón.

== Manuel Godoy ==
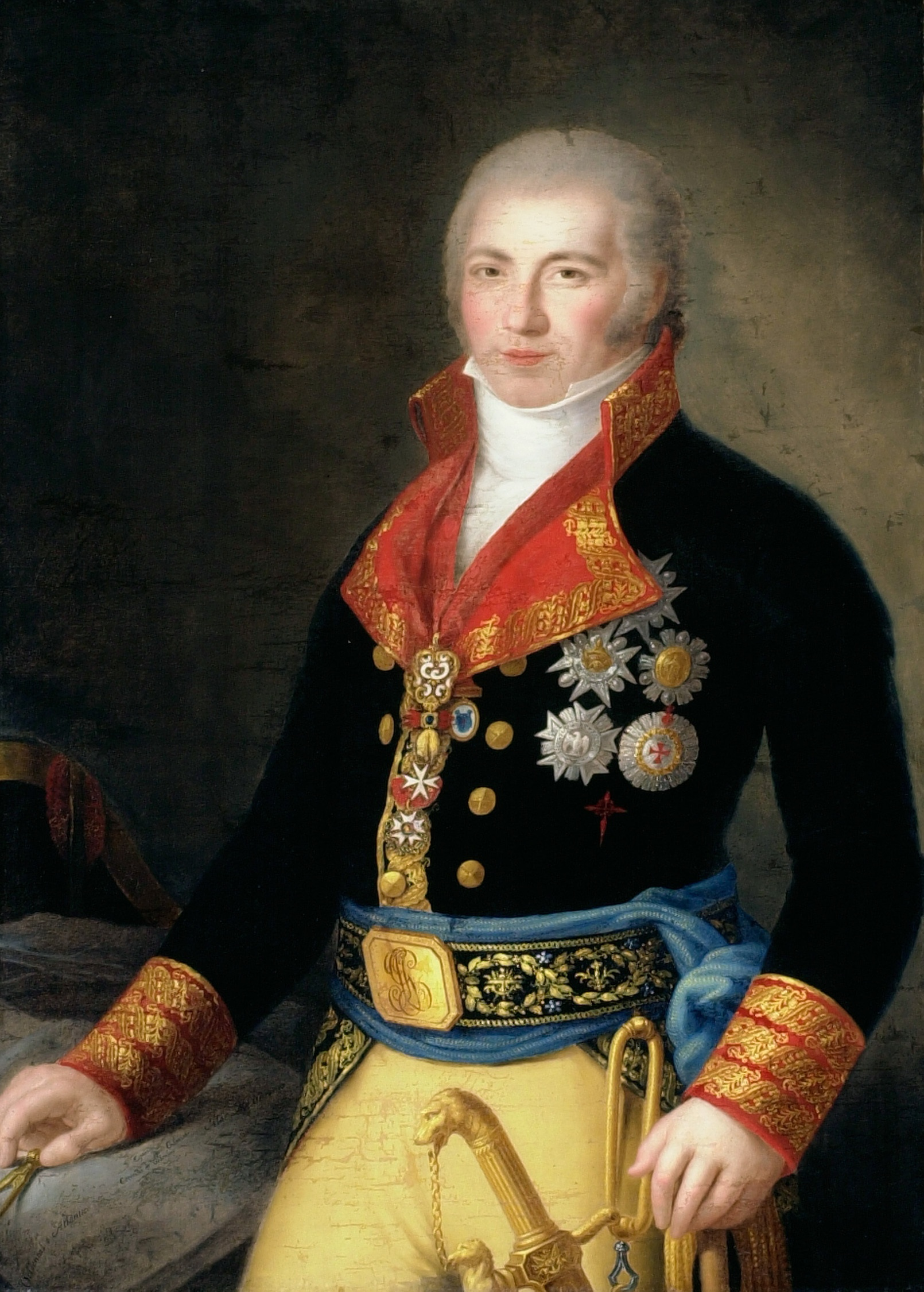
Manuel Godoy, Prince of the Peace, 1st Duke of la Alcudia, 1st Duke of Sueca, Count of Évoramonte, Baron of Mascalbó, Prime Minister of Charles IV of Spain

King Charles IV also granted to Manuel Godoy the Duchy of Sueca, the Barony of Mascalbó and the title of Prince of the Peace. The granting of the latter was an exception in Spanish noble history; since the Middle Ages, no one had held the princely dignity in Spain except the heir of the crown, who did so through three titles: Prince of Asturias, Gerona and of Viana.

He was granted the Portuguese county of Évoramonte, which was due to his marriage to the Countess of Chinchón. However, he was exiled in 1808 when Spain came under Bonaparte rule, and he was not authorized to return to Spain until 1844.

Godoy was also, by papal concession, Prince of Bassano, a title he obtained after acquiring the Italian fief of Bassano di Sutri, located between Rome and Viterbo, during his long exile in Rome.

It seems that he was also "Marqués de Álvarez", as it is named in different documents, although it is a title that was never used by his successors, nor has anyone attempted to rehabilitate it, nor is it stated in the Cast of Greatness and Titles Nobiliarios Españoles or in the Directory of the Diputación de la Grandeza. He was also "Lord of Soto of Rome" and "Viscount of High Andalusia".

== Title holders ==
1. Manuel Godoy y Álvarez de Faria Rios (1792–1851)
2. Adolfo Ruspoli y Godoy (1853–1914)
3. Carlos Ruspoli y Álvarez de Toledo (1915–1936)
4. Camilo Carlos Ruspoli y Caro (1951–1958)
5. Carlos Oswaldo Ruspoli y Morenés (1958–2016)
6. Luis Carlos Ruspoli y Sánchiz (2016-2019)
7. Carlos Ruspoli y Alvarez de las Asturias Bohorques (2019)

== History of the dukes ==
I Duke: Manuel Godoy, I Duke of la Alcudia, and later, I Duke of Sueca and I Baron of Mascalbó. He also received the title of Prince of the Peace (which was expropriated by King Ferdinand VII in 1808), Prince of Bassano (pontifical), and I Count of Évoramonte (Portuguese title). He married: Doña María Teresa de Borbón y Vallabriga, XV Countess of Chinchón, who was the eldest daughter of the Cardinal-Infante Don Luis de Borbón y Farnesio. The first duke's grandson succeeded him:

II Duke: Adolfo Ruspoli y Godoy, Khevenhueller-Metsch and Bourbon (1822–1914), II Duke of la Alcudia, Grandee of Spain 1st class and III Count of Évoramonte, in Portugal. He married in 1857 with Rosalía Álvarez de Toledo y Silva, daughter of the Duke of Medina Sidonia. His son succeeded him:

III Duke: Carlos Rúspoli y Álvarez de Toledo, Godoy and Silva-Bazán (1858–1936), III Duke of la Alcudia, III Duke of Sueca, XVII Count of Chinchón, IV Count of Évoramonte, in Portugal. Grandee of Spain 1st class. He married Carmen Caro and Caro, of the Marquesses of the Romana. His son succeeded him:

IV Duke: Camilo Rúspoli y Caro, Álvarez de Toledo and Caro (1904–1975), who reunites all the titles, both of Manuel Godoy, and of the Infanta María Teresa, by which he became the IV Duke of la Alcudia, IV Duke of Sueca, XVIII Count of Chinchón, and VI Marquess of Boadilla del Monte. Grandee of Spain 1st class. He married Belén Morenés and Arteaga, XVIII Countess of Bañares. His son succeeded him:

V Duke: Carlos Rúspoli y Morenés, Caro and Arteaga (1932–2016), V Duke of la Alcudia, V Duke of Sueca, XIX Count of Chinchón. Grandee of Spain 1st class. Without issue. His nephew succeeded him:

VI Duke: Luis Ruspoli and Sánchiz, Morenés and Núñez-Robres (1963), VI Duke of la Alcudia, VI Duke of Sueca, XX Count of Chinchón. Grandee of Spain 1st class. VIII Marquis of Boadilla del Monte and III Baron of Mascalbó. He married María Álvarez de las Asturias Bohorques and Rumeu, of the Dukes of Gor.

== Family tree ==
Manuel Godoy, 1st Duke of Alcudia; 1767–1851
Carlota de Godoy, 2nd Duchess of Sueca; 1800–1886
Adolfo Ruspoli, 2nd Duke of Alcudia; 1822–1914
Carlos Ruspoli, 3rd Duke of Alcudia; 1858–1936
Camilo Ruspoli, 4th Duke of Alcudia; 1904–1975
Carlos Ruspoli, 5th Duke of Alcudia; 1932–2016	Luis Ruspoli, 7th Marquess of Boadilla del Monte; 1933–2011
Luis Carlos Ruspoli, 6th Duke of Alcudia; 1963

== See also ==
- List of current grandees of Spain
