= Cardinal of Bourbon =

Cardinal of Bourbon or Cardinal de Bourbon may refer to:

- Charles II, Duke of Bourbon (1433–1488), archbishop of Lyon
- Louis de Bourbon-Vendôme (1493–1557), archbishop of Sens
- Charles, Cardinal de Bourbon (born 1523) (1523–1590), archbishop of Rouen
- Charles, Cardinal de Bourbon (born 1562) (1562–1594), archbishop of Rouen
- Infante Luis of Spain (1727–1785)
- Luis María de Borbón y Vallabriga (1777–1823)
