= Camilo Ruspoli, 4th Duke of Alcudia and Sueca =

Carlos Ruspoli y Caro

4th Duke of Alcudia and Sueca
- Predecessor: Prince Carlos Ruspoli
- Successor: Prince Carlos Ruspoli
- Tenure: 1936–1958 (ceded to son)
- Tenure: 1936-1975
- Born: 5 June 1904; Madrid, Spain
- Died: 20 November 1975 (aged 71); Madrid, Spain
- Spouse: María de Belén Morenés y Arteaga, 18th Countess of Bañares (m. 1931)
- Issue: Prince Carlos Ruspoli; Prince Luis Ruspoli; Prince Enrique Ruspoli
Names
- Camilo Carlos Adolfo Ruspoli y Caro
- House: Ruspoli
- Father: Prince Carlos Ruspoli
- Mother: María del Carmen Caro y Caro

Don Camilo Carlos Adolfo Ruspoli y Caro, Álvarez de Toledo y Caro, dei Principi Ruspoli (5 June 1904 – 20 November 1975) was a Spanish aristocrat, son of Carlos Ruspoli, 3rd Duke of Alcudia and Sueca, and first wife Doña María del Carmen Caro y Caro, Álvarez de Toledo y Gomurcio.

He was 4th Duke of Sueca Grandee of Spain First Class, 4th Duke of Alcudia Grandee of Spain First Class with a Coat of Arms of de Godoy and 18th Count of Chinchón Grandee of Spain First Class with a Coat of Arms of de Borbón, 6th Marquis of Boadilla del Monte with a Coat of Arms of Ruspoli after the death of his second cousin Paolo Ruspoli, 5th Marquis of Boadilla del Monte in 1969. And Prince of the Holy Roman Empire.

He died on the same day as Francisco Franco.

== Marriage and children ==
On 7 October 1931 he married, in San Sebastián, Doña María de Belén Morenés y Arteaga, García-Alesson y Echagüe, 18th Countess of Bañares (San Sebastián, 18 August 1906 – Madrid, 30 April 1999), daughter of Don Luis Morenés y García-Alesson, de Toro y Pardo de Rivadeneyra, 14th Marquess of Campoo, 6th Marquess of Bassecourt and wife Doña María de las Mercedes de Arteaga-Silva y Echaguë-Méndez de Vigo, 18th Marchioness of Argüeso, and 17th Countess of Bañares, of the Dukes of the Infantado, and had three sons:

- Carlos Ruspoli, 5th Duke of Alcudia and Sueca
- Luis Ruspoli, 7th Marquis of Boadilla del Monte
- Enrique Jaime Ruspoli, 19th Count of Bañares

== See also ==
- Ruspoli

Spanish nobility
Preceded by Carlos Ruspoli	Duke of Alcudia; 1951–1958 (ceded to son)	Succeeded by Carlos Ruspoli
Preceded by Carlos Ruspoli	Duke of Sueca; 1936–1975	Succeeded by Carlos Ruspoli
Preceded by Paolo Ruspoli	Marqués of Boadilla del Monte; 1969–1975	Succeeded by Luis Ruspoli
