= Count of Chinchón =

Spanish noble title

- Arms of Infante Luis, 13th Count of Chinchón
- Creation date: 9 May 1520 (first creation); 25 April 1794 (second creation)
- Created by: Charles V, Holy Roman Emperor (first creation); Charles IV of Spain (second creation)
- Peerage: Spanish nobility
- First holder: Fernando de Cabrera y Bobadilla (first creation); Luis María de Borbón y Vallabriga (second creation)
- Last holder: Carlos Ruspoli y Morenés
- Present holder: Luis Carlos Ruspoli y Sanchíz
- Heir apparent: Carlos Ruspoli y Alvarez de las Asturias Bohorques, Duke of Alcudia
- Remainder to: the 1st Count's heirs lawfully begotten
- Subsidiary titles: Marquis of San Martín de la Vega
- Extinction date: 1785 (first creation)
- Seat: Palace of Infante don Luis (Boadilla del Monte)
- Former seat: Castle of Chinchón

Count of Chinchón (Spanish: Conde de Chinchón) is a title of Spanish nobility. It was initially created on 9 May 1520 by King Charles V, Holy Roman Emperor (Charles I of Spain), who granted the title to Fernando de Cabrera y Bobadilla.

== History ==
The title, and its dominion over the territory of twenty towns including Chinchón itself, remained in the Cabrera family until 1683. At that point, the Italian aristocratic Savelli family acquired the county.

In 1738, José Sforza-Cesarini-Savelli, 11th Count of Chinchón, sold the territory and the title to King Philip V of Spain's son, Philip, 12th Count of Chinchón. He ceded the county on 28 May 1761 to his younger brother, Luis, 13th Count of Chinchón. However, Luis and his successors would lose the rights to the Spanish throne following a battle of succession amongst his brothers (Charles III of Spain was the victor).

The title was recreated on 25 April 1794 by Charles IV of Spain for Luis' son, Luis María de Borbón y Vallabriga, who took the title of 14th Count of Chinchón. His sister later became the 15th Countess of Chinchón and when she died in 1828, she was succeeded by her daughter, Carlota de Godoy. The Italian Ruspoli family subsequently acquired the title through the marriage of Camillo Ruspoli with Carlota de Godoy.

== List of titleholders ==
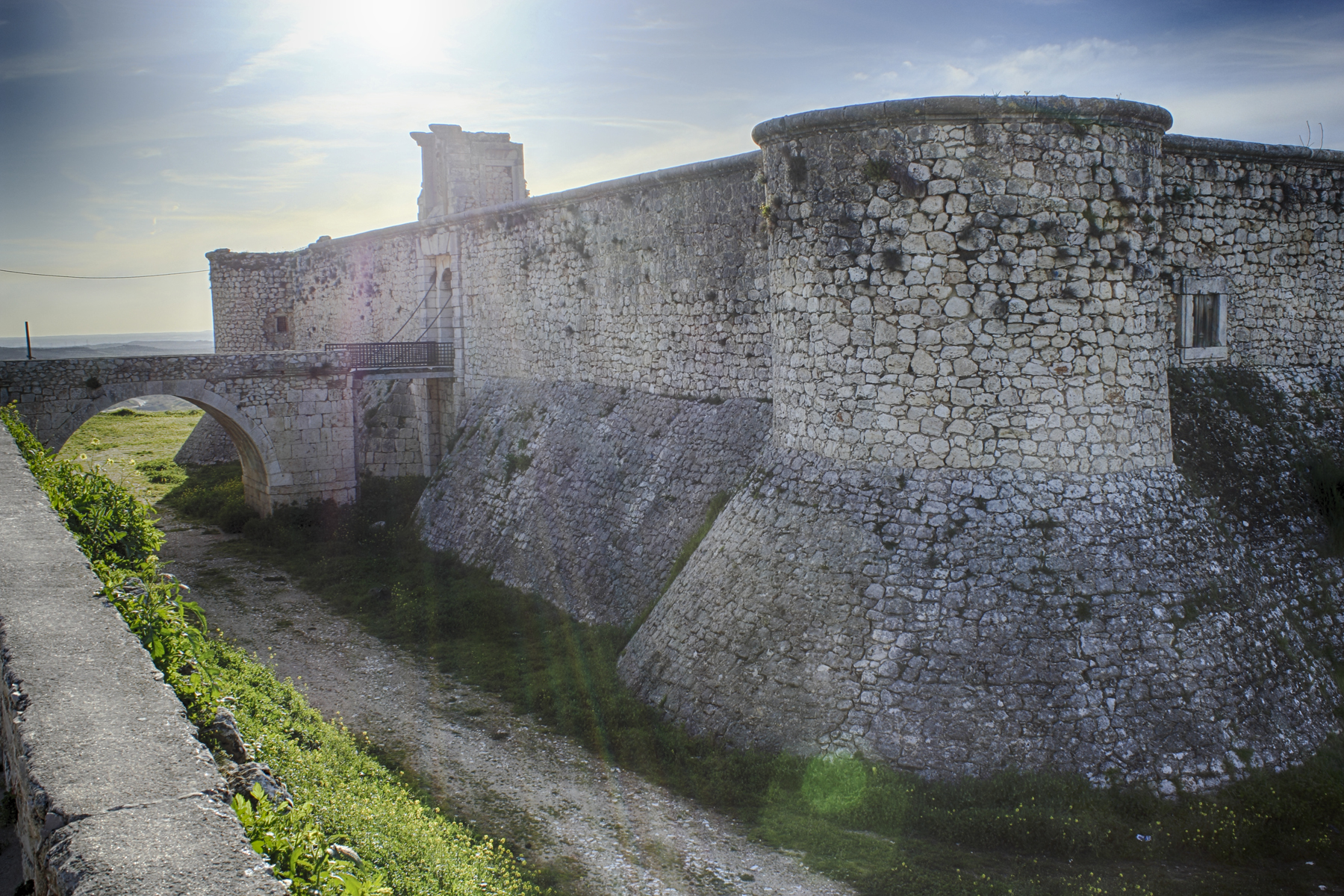
Castle of Chinchón

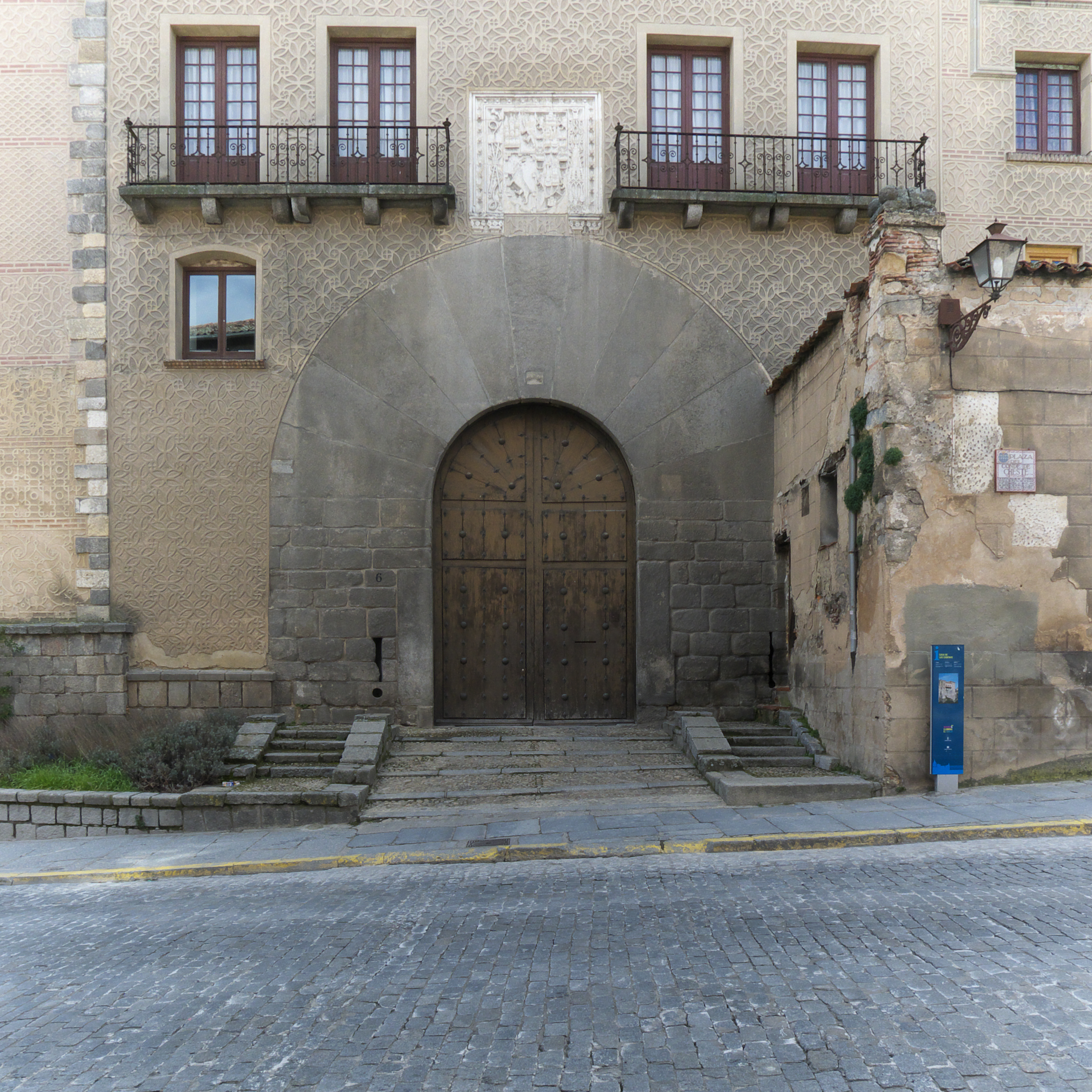
Palace of the Counts in Segovia

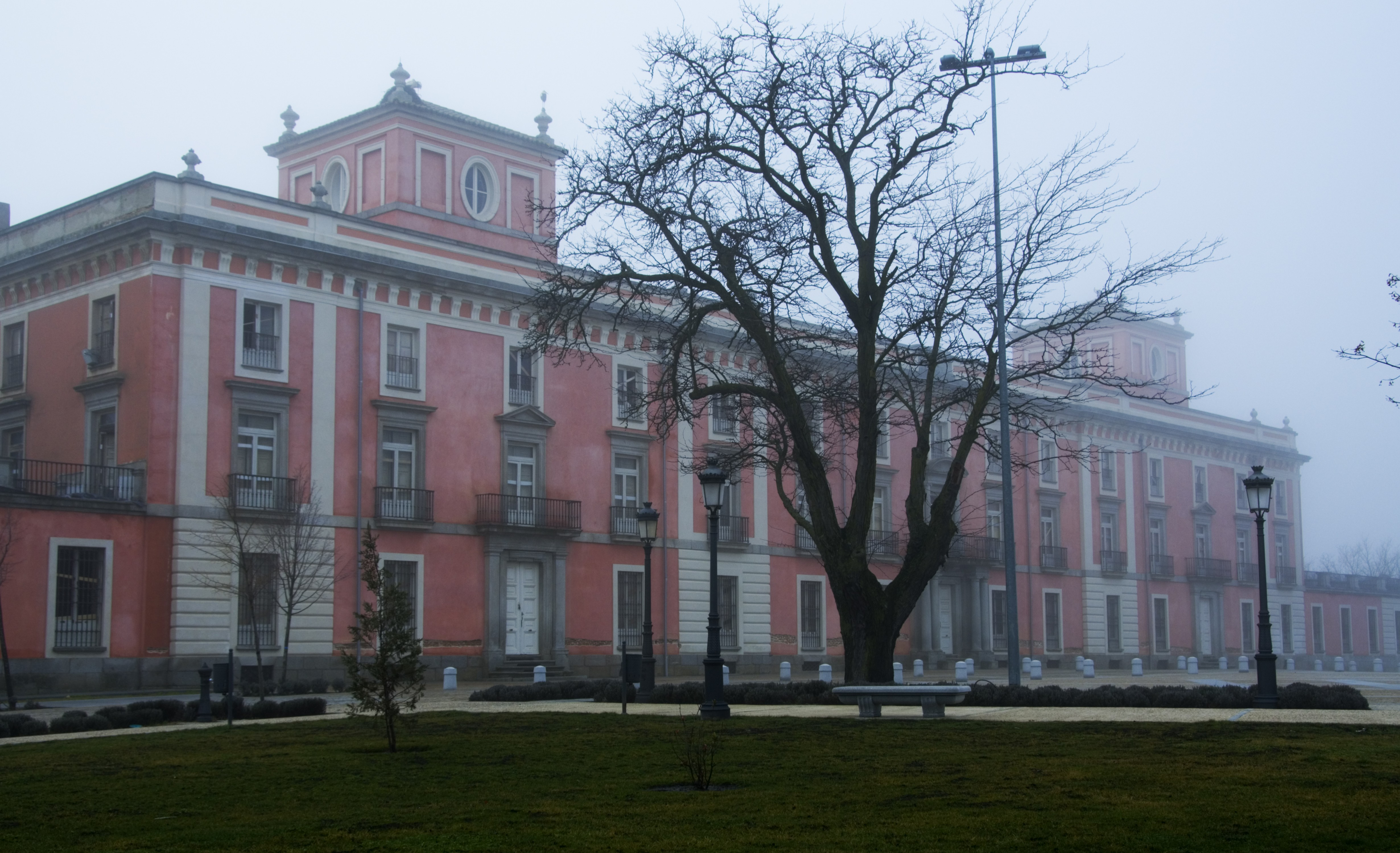
Palace of Infante don Luis (Boadilla del Monte)

	Titular	Periodo
Lords of Chinchón Created by Isabel I of Castile
I	Andrés de Cabrera	1489-1511
II	Fernando de Cabrera y Bobadilla (I conde)	1511-1521
Counts of Chinchón 1st creation, by Carlos I of Spain in 1520
I	Fernando de Cabrera y Bobadilla	1520-1521
II	Pedro Fernández de Cabrera y Bobadilla	1521-1575
III	Diego Fernández de Cabrera y Bobadilla	1575-c.1600
IV	Luis Jerónimo Fernández de Cabrera y Bobadilla	c.1600-1647
V	Francisco Fausto Fernández de Cabrera y Bobadilla	1647-1665
VI	Inés de Castro Cabrera y Bobadilla	1665-1665
VII	Francisca de Cárdenas Cabrera y Bobadilla	1666-1669
VIII	Francisca de Castro Cabrera y Bobadilla	1669-1683
IX	Julio Savelli y Peretti	1683-1712
X	Juan Jorge Sforza Cesarini Savelli	1712-1729
XI	José Sforza Cesarini Savelli	1729-1738
Disposal authorized by Philip V of Spain
XII	Philip of Spain	1738-1761
Disposal authorized by Charles III
XIII	Luis of Spain	1761-1785
2nd creation by Charles IV in 1794
XIV	Luis María de Borbón y Vallabriga	1794-1803
XV	María Teresa de Borbón y Vallabriga	1803-1828
XVI	Carlota de Godoy y Borbón	1828-1886
XVII	Carlos Luis Rúspoli y Álvarez de Toledo	1886-1936
XVIII	Camilo Carlos Adolfo Rúspoli y Caro	1936-1975
XIX	Carlos Oswaldo Rúspoli y Morenés	1975-2016
XX	Luis Carlos Ruspoli y Sanchíz	2016

== The dominion of Chinchón ==
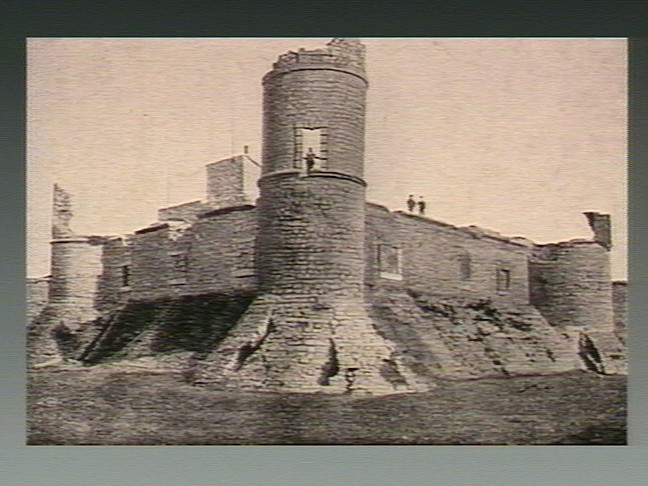
The ruins of the Castle of Chinchon, Spain

This extensive state was granted in perpetuity by the Catholic Monarchs by Royal Order given at Toledo on 20 July 1489, and endorsed by Fernando Álvarez de Toledo, his secretary, in favor of Andrés de Cabrera and Beatriz de Bobadilla, the first Marquis of Moya. The señorío included twenty villages and numerous places, with 1,200 vasallos, that had been dismembered shortly before the jurisdiction of the city of Segovia and incorporated to Corona. The villas in it included Valdelaguna, Chinchón, Valdeconejos, Bayona de Tajuña, San Martin de la Vega, Ciempozuelos and Seseña, all in the sexmo of Valdemoro; And in that of Casarrubios, those of Moraleja de Enmedio, Moraleja la Mayor, Serranillos, La Cabeza, Zarzuela, Puebla de Mari Martín, Tiracentenos, Sacedón, Cienvallejos, Odón, Brunete, Quijorna and Vega Sagrilla, with all their lands

And pastures, and with "civil and criminal jurisdiction high and low, a mere and mixed empire, and separately by itself and on their own in them and each of them, mayors, sheriff, clerk and crier, gallows and pillory, Chain of scourge, and the other insignia of our righteousness. "

On July of that year, the Marquises of Moya had given power to Martin de Alarcon, commander of the Membrilla, to take possession of these villas and jurisdiction on his behalf. The Catholic Monarchs issued a Royal Decree on 6 July ordering all of them to give possession to the said Marquises as new lords. The city of Segovia strongly opposed this dismemberment and moved several lawsuits against the counts of Chinchón, demanding the suppression of the mercy and maintaining the right of all the pastors of its community of city and earth to use of the pastures of the señorío. These lawsuits lasted for 112 years and during that time it was provided that the meadows, ejidos and watering places included in the donation to the marquises of Moya were reduced to the common pasture of the Segovians. On 12 June 1592, through the mediation of Bishop Andrés Pacheco, a concord was signed between this consistory and Diego Fernandez de Cabrera and Bobadilla, III Count of Chinchón, which ended the litigation and was confirmed by King Felipe II in Illescas on 29 May of the same year and at San Lorenzo del Escorial on 17 July 1793.3

The first marquises of Moya linked the señorío de Chinchón, along with the perpetual offices of mayor and guard of the Reales Alcázares de Segovia and treasurer of his mint, in a mayorazgo that they founded in the head of Fernando de Cabrera and Bobadilla, his Second son, that in 1520 was created I count of Chinchón.

== House of Cabrera and descendants ==
Arms of the Counts of Chinchón of the Cabrera family

• I Count: Fernando de Cabrera y Bobadilla, 1st Count of Chinchón, mayor and perpetual guard of the Royal Alcazar of Segovia and treasurer of the mint of this city, knight of Santiago and commander of Montemolín. He fought against the comuneros with the degree of great captain, died in 1521 and was buried with his wife in the disappeared church of Our Lady of Grace of Chinchón, and later transferred to the new one of the Assumption.

He married Teresa de la Cueva, a native of Cuéllar, daughter of Francisco I Fernandez de la Cueva and Mendoza, II Duke of Alburquerque, II Count of Ledesma and II of Huelma, and Francisca de Toledo, his wife, daughter of the first dukes Of Alba.

In 1521, his son succeeded him:

• II Count: Pedro Fernandez de Cabrera y Bobadilla, natural and II Count of Chinchón, butler of King Felipe II and minister of his Councils of State, War, Italy and Aragon.4 He possessed the perpetual offices of his father, to which he added those of Ensign Major of Segovia5 and general treasurer of the Kingdom and Crown of Aragon, with place in this council and in the one of Italy, also by interest of inheritance.

He married Mencía de Mendoza and Cerda, daughter of Diego Hurtado de Mendoza, I Count of Mélito and Aliano (titles of the kingdom of Naples), and of Ana de la Cerda, his wife, Miedes, Galve, Pastrana and Mandayona; Granddaughter of Cardinal Pedro Gonzalez de Mendoza, archbishop of Toledo, and of Mencía de Lemos, and maternal of Inigo López de la Cerda, of the counts of Medinaceli, and of Brianda de Castro.

In 1575 his son succeeded

• III Count: Diego Fernández de Cabrera y Bobadilla (nc1535), III Count of Chinchón, treasurer of the Crown of Aragon and the Mint of Segovia, second lieutenant of this city and mayor of his Royal Alcazar, patron and general protector of the Franciscan Order, all in perpetuity. It served to the King in the relief of Mazalquivir (1563) and in the wars with France, being in Batalla de San Quintín (1557).

It happened to his father in the general treasury of Aragon, perpetual office by which he was born member of the Supreme Council of that crown, with voice also of Italy. He held the position when the Alterations of Aragon took place, and "it was unpleasant to the Aragonese, because they feared that it did not correspond to their wills".

He married Ines Pacheco, his second cousin, a native of Escalona, who was baptized on 10 July 1537, daughter of Diego López Pacheco, III Marquis of Villena, III Duke of Escalona, III Count of Xiquena and VI of San Esteban de Gormaz, and Of Luisa de Cabrera and Bobadilla, III marquesa de Moya; Granddaughter of ... and mother of Juan Perez de Cabrera and Bobadilla, II Marquis of Moya, and Ana de Mendoza, of the Dukes of the Infantado.

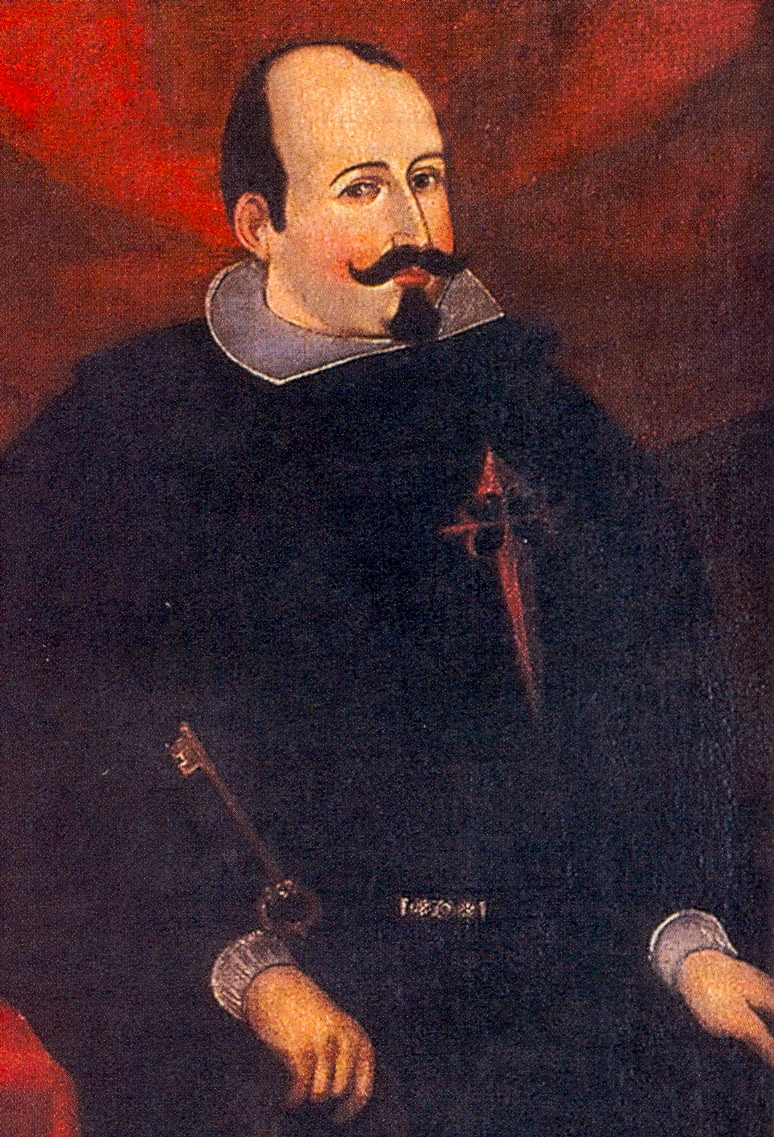
Luis Jerónimo Fernández de Cabrera y Bobadilla

Around 1600 his son succeeded

• IV Count: Luis Jerónimo Fernández de Cabrera y Bobadilla (1586-1647), IV Count of Chinchón, Viceroy of Peru, Commander of Campo de Criptana in the Order of Santiago. Born in Madrid, he was baptized in San Nicolás on 20 October 1586, and died in the same town on 28 October 1647.

It was the last one of his house that possessed the dignity of general treasurer of Aragon, with place in the Council of this crown and voice also in the one of Italy. He entered to practice it by Real Despacho of 18 November 1612, after fulfilling the minimum age required of 25 years; He renounced it about 1625, and S.M. It was again granted to Juan de Mendoza and Luna, III marquis de Montesclaros, by Royal Office of 8 January 1627.15

He married twice: first with Ana Osorio, who had no succession, daughter of Pedro Álvarez Osorio, VIII Marquis of Astorga, IX Count of Trastamara and VIII of Santa Marta.

And the second time he married Francisca Enríquez de Ribera, a native of Seville. This lady, being viceroy of Peru, cured of fevers in 1629 thanks to the treatment with

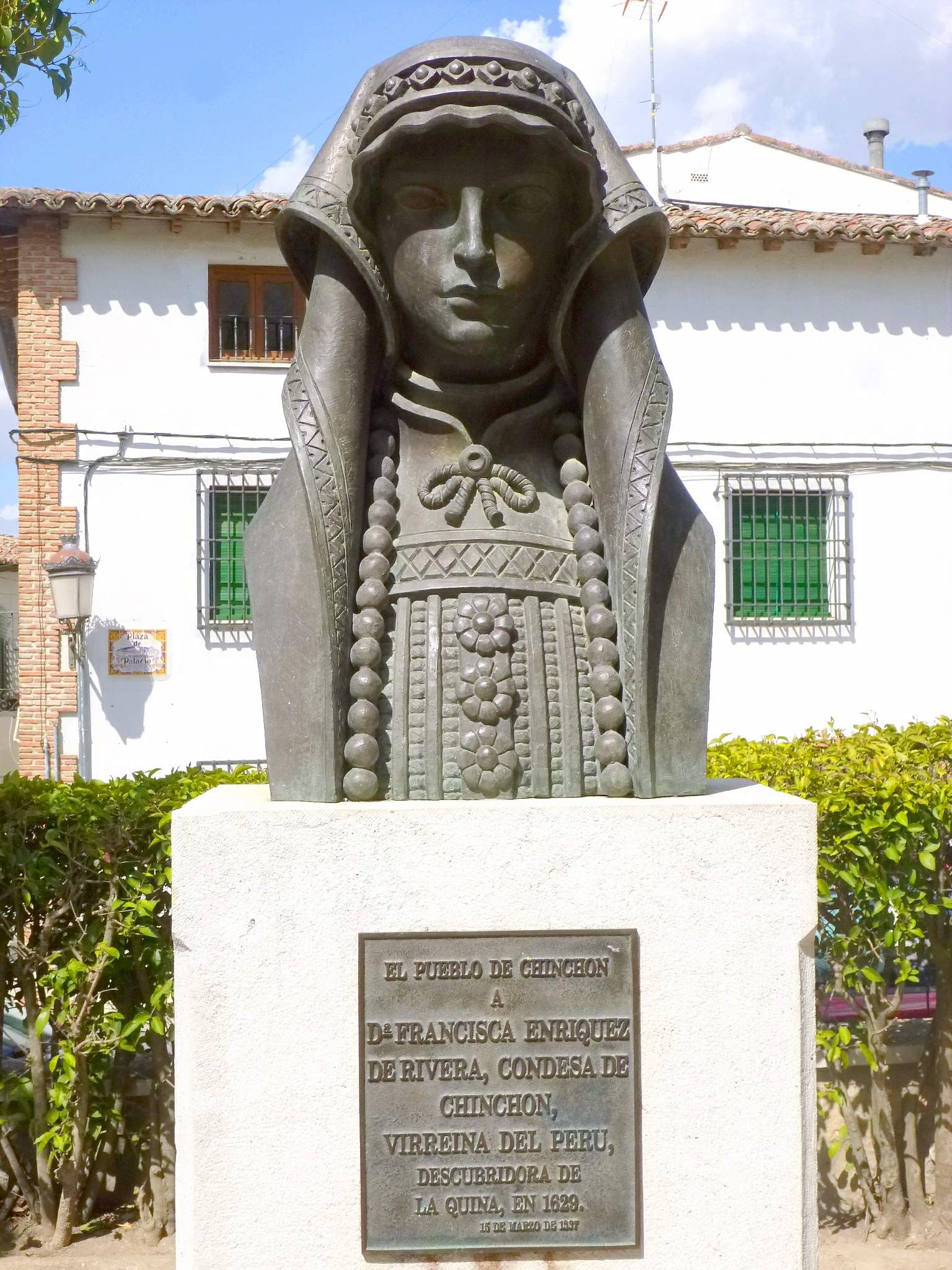
Francisca Enríquez de Rivera, Countess of Chinchón Virreina del Perú

quina bark. His case became famed and contributed to the dissemination of this indigenous medicine of the Indies, which in his memory was called chinchona. She was the sister of Inés de Guzmán, a woman of Andrés de Castro (of the counts of Lemos, cousin of her husband) and mother of the VI and the VIII Countess of Chinchón. Daughter of Perafán de Ribera and Inés Enríquez Tavera de Saavedra, heiress of the house and mayorazgo of Saavedra and I:st Countess de la Torre, lady of honor of the Queen of France and lady of honor of the one of Spain; Granddaughter of Perafán de Ribera, descendant of the adelantados of Andalusia, and Antonia de Guzmán.

In 1647 he succeeded his only son, born of the second marriage:

• V Count: Francisco Fausto Fernández de Cabrera y Bobadilla, V Count of Chinchón, I Marquis of San Martín de la Vega. He was born on 25 January 1629, in the place of San Bayaque, corregimiento de Saña and Kingdom of Peru, 14 and died on 3 October 1665.16 In 1636, when he was still a child and in the life of his father, King Philip IV granted him The title of waiting of marquess of San Martin de la Vega, on one of the towns of the sexmo of Valdemoro that integrated the señorío of Chinchón.

He married Juana de Cordoba and Velasco, the natural daughter of Luis de Velasco and Tovar, the Mudo, I Viscount of Sauquillo and I Marquis of Fresno, knight of the Order of Santiago and commander of Portezuelo in that of Alcantara, and granddaughter of Constable Juan Fernandez de Velasco and Tovar, V Duque de Frías, and Juana de Córdoba and Aragon, his second wife.18 They had no offspring.

In October 1665 happened to him to his cousin

• VI Countess: Inés de Castro Cabrera y Bobadilla (c. 1635-1665), VI Countess of Chinchón, II Marquesa de San Martín de la Vega, Queen of the Marian Queen of Austria, a member of the Second Count of Chinchón, daughter of the Comendador Andrés de Castro and granddaughter of the V Counts of Lemos. She was the second cousin of her predecessor for the line of succession of the house, which was the paternal of both, but also her carnal cousin, for their mothers were sisters. And he survived only two months, for he died in Madrid on 27 December 1665.16 At this time he came into possession of the mayorazgo and jurisdictions, but did not title.

He married in the Royal Palace of Buen Retiro, on 11 November 1657,16 with Jose Alejo de Cárdenas Ulloa y Zúñiga (c.1630-1665), XI Count of Puebla del Maestre, X de Nieva and Villalonso, II Marquis Of Bacares, VI of La Mota and V of Auñón, lord of the house of Valda and added in Azcoitia, patron of the church of Santa Maria la Real of this town and of the convent of San Felipe el Real of Madrid, elect extraordinary ambassador From SMC In France (1685), butler of King Charles II and the gentleman of his Chamber with entry, son of Diego de Cárdenas y Herrera, X conde de la Puebla del Maestre, I marqués de Bacares and III de Auñón, knight of Santiago, assistant and Master of the general field of Seville, and Mariana de Ulloa Zúñiga and Velasco, his wife, IX Countess of Nieva and V Marquesa de la Mota.

In 1666 his daughter succeeded

• VII Countess: Francisca de Cárdenas Cabrera y Bobadilla (1660-1669), VII Countess of Chinchón, XII of Puebla del Maestre, XI de Nieva and Villalonso, IV Marquesa de Bacares, VII de la Mota, VI de Auñón and III de San Martín De la Vega, girl of the Queen mother Mariana of Austria. She died on 23 October 1669, at the age of nine, 16 and was buried in the convent of Preachers of Our Lady of Atocha.

In 1669 his carnal aunt, his mother's sister, succeeded him:

• VIII Countess: Francisca de Castro Cabrera y Bobadilla, VIII Countess of Chinchón, IV Marquesa de San Martín de la Vega. He married twice: first with Francisco de Guzman († 1672), son of Pedro de Guzmán, III marquis de la Algaba and VI of Ardales, VI conde de Teba, and in second nuptials with Enrique de Benavides and Bazán, marquis de Bayona. The VIII Countess died without descent on 22 February 1683.16

In 1683 his third cousin succeeded

Arms of Sforza Cesarini

• IX Count: Julio Savelli and Peretti, IX Count of Chinchón, III Prince of Albano and II of Venafro, II Duke of Ariccia, Marquis of San Martino, Count of Celano, Baron of Pescina, perpetual marshal of the Holy Roman Church, Lord of San Rufino, San Benedetto dei Marsi, Aschi, Cocullo, Venere, Cerchio, Lecce dei Marsi, Gioia dei Marsi, Biseglia, San Sebastiano, Sperone, Ortucchio, Torre in Pietra, Palidoro, Tor Lupara, Montana, Grotta Scrofana, Stazzano and Castel Cretone, Toisón de Oro. Top affiliated as tataranieto II Count of Chinchón: great-grandson of Leonor de la Cerda and grandson of the I princes of Venafro. Some sources consider him to be great of Spain, concessionaire of a dignity of such supposedly created by King Philip IV towards 1683.2

He married twice: first with Anna Aldobrandini, his carnal cousin, daughter of Pietro Aldobrandini, Duke of Carpineto, and Carlotta Savelli, his wife, who was the sister of Julio's father; Granddaughter of Gian Francesco Aldobrandini, general of the Holy Roman Church, the offshoot of a minor branch of the Aldobrandini established in Florence, and of Olimpia Aldobrandini, of the major branch, princess of Rossano, who was sister of Cardinal camerlengo Pietro Aldobrandini and niece carnal Of Pope Clement VIII, 20 and maternal of the I princes of Albano, already mentioned.

And secondly he married Caterina Giustiniani, daughter of Andrea Giustiniani, I Prince of Bassano, and Maria Flaminia Pamphili. Of the first she had a legitimate son:

In 1719 his nephew grandson succeeded

•X Count: Juan Jorge Sforza Cesarini Savelli (Rome 1678 - Pamplona 1729), 21 X Count of Chinchón. No descendants.

In 1729 his nephew Carnal happened

• XI Count: José Sforza Cesarini Savelli (1705-1774), 11th Count of Chinchón, prince of Santa Flora, Genzano and Valmontone, Duke of Segni, etc., knight of the Golden Fleece (1738). Last county holder of the downline of the first concessionaire. He married Maria Francisca Giustiniani, of the princes of Bassano, and they had numerous descendants. Three of their sons gave birth to the Sforza-Cesarini lines: the firstborn of the princes of Santa Flora and Genzano, the dukes of Segni, and the counts of Celano.

== House of Borbón and descendants ==
Alienation in favor of the Duke of Parma (1738)

The title and state of count of Chinchón was sold in 1738 by the XI count, Jose Sforza Cesarini Savelli, with license of King Felipe V, in favor of the

• XII Count: Infante de España Don Felipe de Borbón, XII Count of Chinchón (son of the King and Isabel de Farnesio, his second consort), who later became Duke of Parma, Plasencia and Guastalla. He married Princess Luisa Isabel of France, also of the house of Bourbon, daughter of the Kings Luis XV of France and Maria Leszczynska, its first consort, of the real house of Poland, and had descendants in which follows the house of Parma.

Alienation in favor of the infant Don Luis (1761)

The Duke of Parma again sold the county of Chinchón 28 May 1761, with license of its brother King Carlos III, in favor of a whole brother and smaller of both:

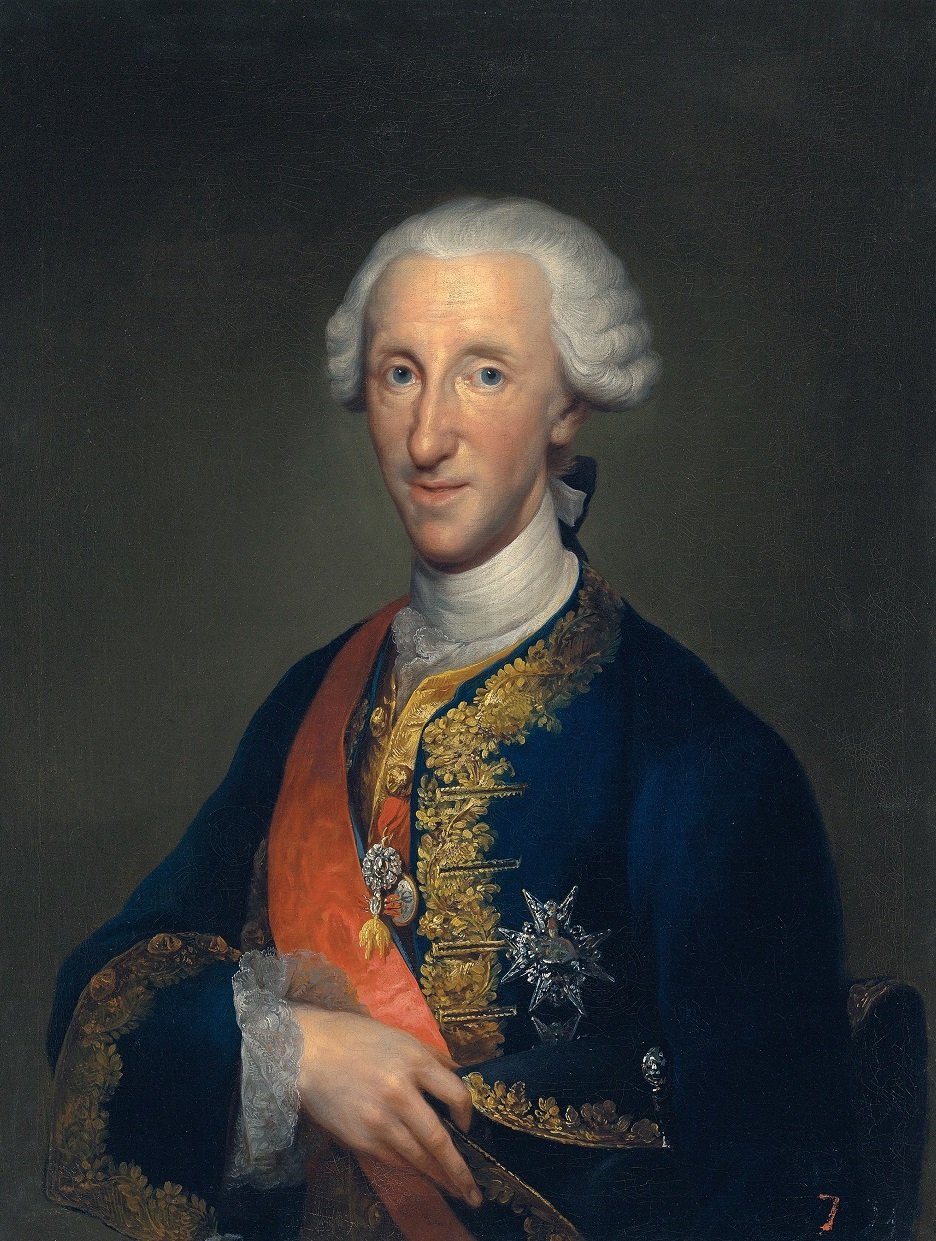
Portrait of Infante Luis of Spain, XIII Count of Chinchón

• XIII Count: Luis of Bourbon and Farnese. He had been archbishop of Toledo and Seville and cardinal of the title of Santa Maria della Scala, but resigned his ecclesiastical positions and obtained the resignation of the clerical state to marry Maria Teresa Of Vallabriga and Rozas, 1 daughter of Luis de Vallabriga and Maria Josefa de Rozas y Melfort, III Countess of Castelblanco.

=== Second Creation (1794) ===
The second creation of the county was made effective by Royal Decree of Carlos IV given 25 April 1794. This is the current date of creation according to the Diputación Permanente de Títulos del Reino, also mentioning the date of 1520 as the Primitive creation.

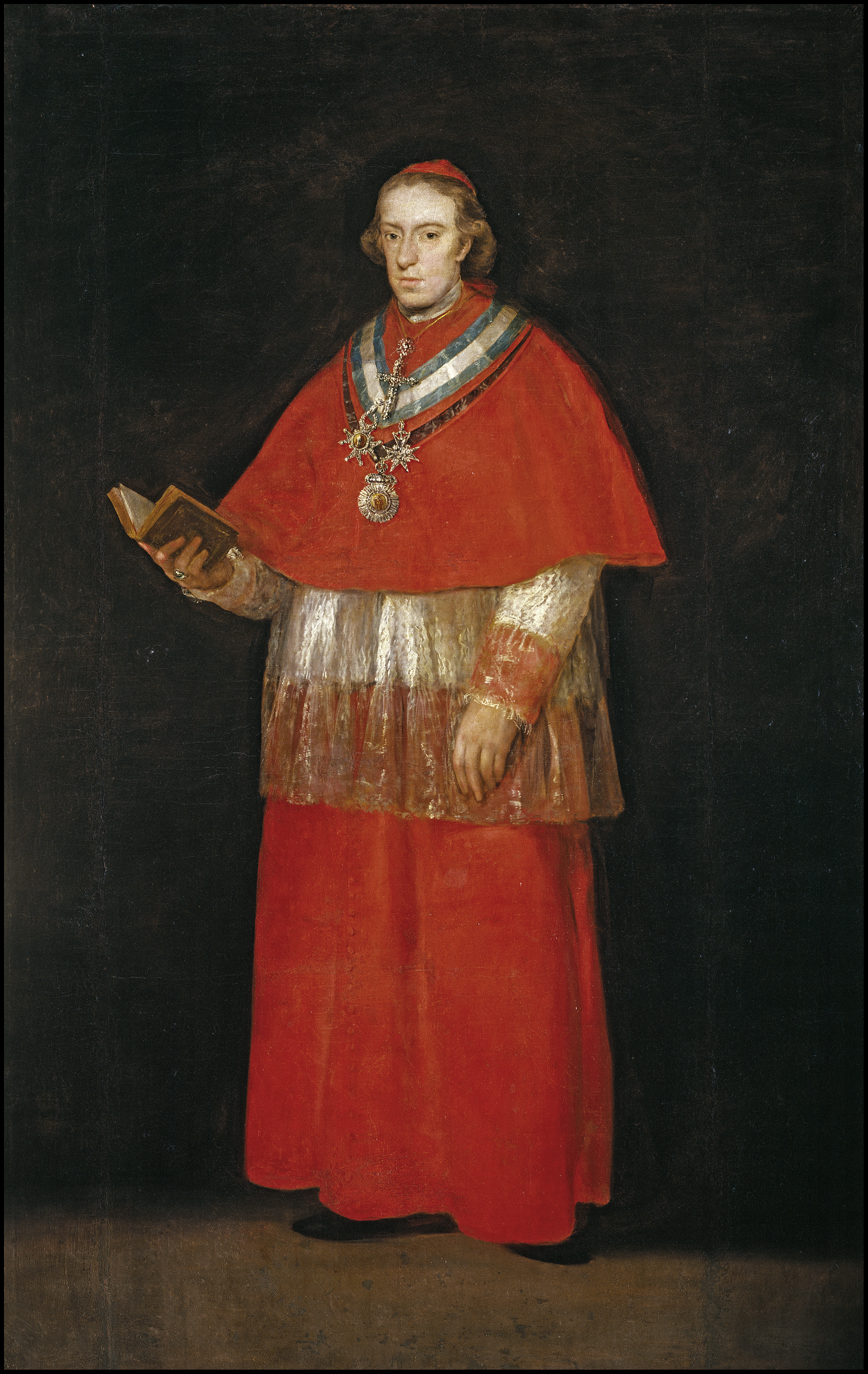
Luis María de Borbón y Vallabriga, XIV Count of Chinchón, Archbishop of Seville and Toledo, Cardinal

• XIV Count: Luis María Cardinal de Borbón y Vallabriga, Farnesio y Rozas, XIV conde de Chinchón, 24 concessionaire of the greatness of Spain in 1799, Marquis de San Martín de la Vega, son morganático of the infant Don Luis. He was like his father archbishop of Seville and Toledo, cardinal of the title of Santa Maria della Scala and knight of the Golden Toisón. No descendants.

The 1 July 1803 yielded the county to its sister

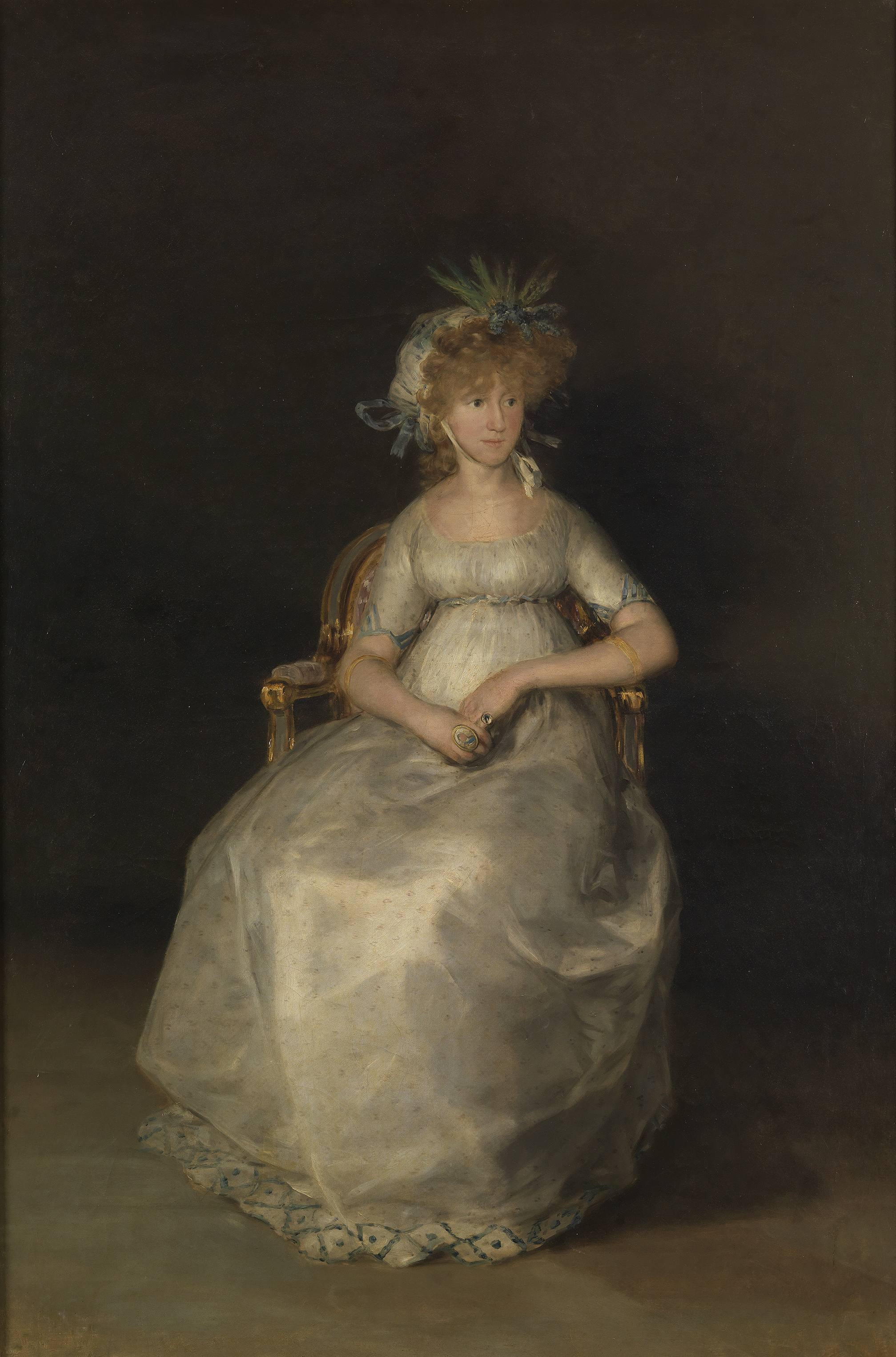
Maria Teresa de Borbon y Vallabriga, XV Countess of Chinchón

• XV Countess: Maria Teresa de Borbón y Vallabriga, XV Countess of Chinchón, great of Spain, I Countess of Boadilla del Monte (title that was elevated to marquesado in the person of its daughter Carlota). He married Manuel Godoy and Álvarez de Faria, Prince of Peace, I Duke of Alcudia and I of Sueca, both with greatness, I Baron de Mascalbó, I Prince of Bassano (Pontifical title) and I Count of Evoramonte (title From Portugal). This marriage was declared void.

His only daughter succeeded him:

• XVI Countess: Carlota Luisa Manuela de Godoy y Borbón, XVI Countess of Chinchón, II Duchess of Sueca, twice gandee of Spain, I marquess of Boadilla del Monte. King Ferdinand VII restored half of the property seized to his father. He inherited the magnificent collection of works of art of his uncle Cardinal Luis María Cardinal de Borbón y Vallabriga, Farnesio y Rozas, as well as all the paintings of his aunt María Luisa de Borbón and Vallabriga, both brothers of his mother. He married in Rome on 8 November 1821, with Camilo Rúspoli and Khevenhüller-Mestch (1788-1864), Roman prince, leader of the dragon squadron of Pope Leo XII, knight of the Order of Malta, master of Granada and great cross of Carlos III, son of Francesco Ruspoli, III prince of Cerveteri, and of the countess Maria Leopoldina de Khevenhüller-Metsch. his son grandson her:

Ruspoli coat of arms

•XVII Count: Carlos Luis Rúspoli and Álvarez de Toledo (1858-1936), XVII Count of Chinchón (by cession of his grandmother, former Countess, and resignation of his father Adolfo Rúspoli), III Duke of Alcudia and III of Sueca, three times Grandee of Spain, IV count of Evoramonte. He married twice: first with Carmen Caro and Caro, from the Counts of Caltavuturo,

He was succeeded by his son from the first marriage

• XVIII Count: Camilo Carlos Adolfo Rúspoli y Caro, XVIII Count of Chinchón, IV Duke of Alcudia and IV of Sueca, three times grandee of Spain, V Marquis of Boadilla del Monte. He married Belén Morenés and Arteaga, the eighteenth Countess of Bañares.

He was succeeded by his son

•XIX Count: Carlos Oswaldo Rúspoli and Morenés (1932-2016), XIX Count of Chinchón, V Duke of Alcudia and V of Sueca, three times grandee of Spain. He was born in San Sebastián on 5 August 1932, and died a widower and without descendants in Madrid on 25 October 2016. His nephew succeeded him:

•XX Count: Luis Carlos Ruspoli y Sanchíz, Morenés y Núñez-Robres (1963 –), XX Count of Chinchón, VI Duke of la Alcudia, VI Duke of Sueca, VIII Marquess of Boadilla del Monte and III Baron of Mascalbó, three times grandee of Spain. Married in Madrid, 1992 with Doña María Álvarez de las Asturias Bohorques y Rumeu, de Silva y Cruzat, daughter of Don Luis Álvarez de las Asturias Bohorques y Silva, Goyeneche y Mitjans, son of the Dukes of Gor, and Doña María Rumeu y Cruzat, de Armas y Suárez de Argudín, daughter of the Marqueses of Casa Argudín.

== Family Trees ==
=== House of Cabrera and descendants ===
Fernando de Cabrera y Bobadilla, I Count of Chinchón († 1521)
Pedro de Cabrera y Bobadilla, II Count of Chinchón († 1575)
Diego de Cabrera y Bobadilla, III Count of Chinchón	Teresa de la Cueva, Countess of Lemos († 1602)	Mariana de la Cerda, Countess of la Somaglia
Luis Jerónimo de Cabrera y Bobadilla, IV Count of Chinchón (1589-1647)	Andrés de Castro Cabrera y Bobadilla († 1647)	Margarita Cavazzi, Princess of Venafro († 1613)
Francisco de Cabrera y Bobadilla, V Count of Chinchón (1629-1665)	Inés de Castro, VI Countess of Chinchón († 1665)	Francisca de Castro, VIII Countess of Chinchón († 1687)	Cardenal Francisco Peretti, II Prince of Venafro (1595-1693)	María Feliche Peretti, Princess of Albano, III Princess of Venafro (1603-1650)
Francisca de Cárdenas, VII Countess of Chinchón (1629-1665)	Margarita Savelli, Duchess of Citanova († 1690)	Julio Savelli, III Prince of Albano, IX Count of Chinchón (1626-1712)
Livia Cesarini, Duchess Sforza Cesarini († 1712)
Cayetano Sforza Cesarini, II Duke Sforza Cesarini (1674-1727)	Juan Jorge Sforza Cesarini, X Count of Chinchón (1678-1729)
José Sforza Cesarini, III Duke Sforza Cesarini, XI Count of Chinchón (1705-1744)
Felipe Sforza Cesarini, IV Duke Sforza Cesarini (1727-1764); Con sucesión en los duques Sforza Cesarini.

=== House of Borbón and descendants ===
Philip V of Spain (1683-1746)
Philip I of Parme, Duke of Parme, XII Count of Chinchón (1720-1765)	Luis of Spain, Infante of Spain, XIII Count of Chinchón (1727-1785)
Ferdinand I, Duke of Parme (1751-1802); With succession in Dukes of Parma.	Luis de Borbón, Cardinal Regent; XIV Count of Chinchon (1777-1823)	María Teresa de Borbón, Princess of the Peace, XV Countess of Chinchón (1780-1828)
Carlota de Godoy, II Duchess of Sueca, XVI Countess of Chinchón (1800–1886)
Adolfo Ruspoli, II Duke of Alcudia (1822–1914)
Carlos Ruspoli, III Duke of Alcudia and Sueca, XVII Count of Chinchón (1858–1936)
Carlos Ruspoli, IV Duke of Alcudia and Sueca, XVIII Count of Chinchón (1904–1975)
Carlos Ruspoli, V Duke of Alcudia and Sueca, XIX Count of Chinchón (1932-2016)	Luis Ruspoli, VII Marquis of Boadilla del Monte (1933-2011)
Luis Ruspoli, VI Duke of Alcudia and Sueca, XX Count of Chinchón (2016)

== See also ==
- Chinchón
- The Countess of Chinchon
