= Luis María de Borbón y Vallabriga =

Spanish cardinal

His Eminence Luis María de Borbón y Vallabriga
- Cardinal Archbishop of Toledo; Primate of Spain
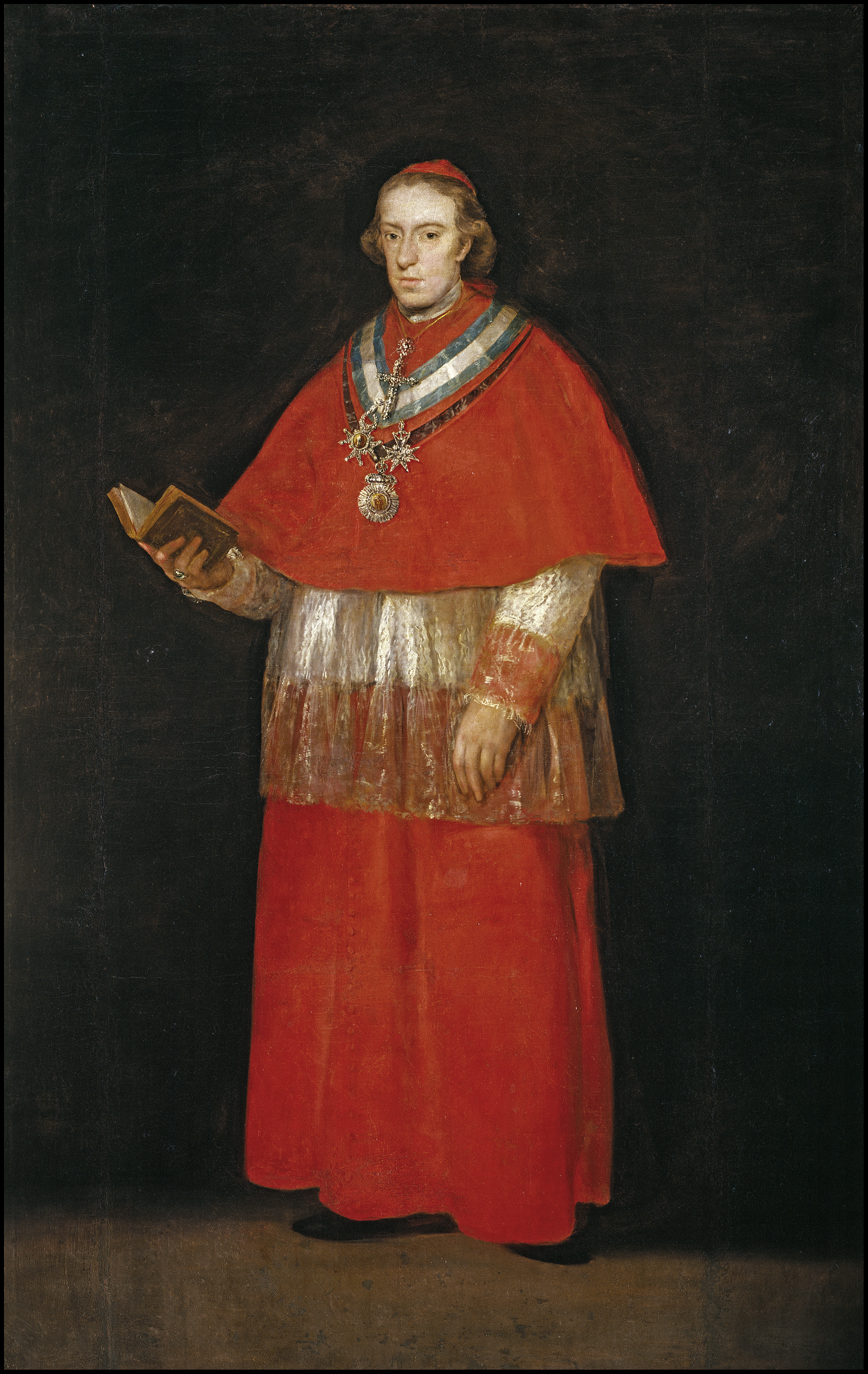
- Portrait by Francisco Goya
- Church: Catholic Church
- Archdiocese: Toledo
- In office: 1800–1814
- Predecessor: Francisco Antonio de Lorenzana
- Successor: Pedro Inguanzo y Rivero
- Other posts: Administrator of Seville (1800–1814); Cardinal-Priest of Santa Maria della Scala (1800–1823)

Orders
- Consecration: 2 June 1799 by Antonino de Sentmenat y Cartellá
- Created cardinal: 20 October 1800 by Pope Pius VII
- Rank: Cardinal-Priest

Personal details
- Born: 22 May 1777 Cadalso de los Vidrios, Spain
- Died: 19 March 1823 (aged 45) Madrid, Spain
- Buried: Toledo Cathedral
- Parents: Infante Luis of Spain; María Teresa de Vallabriga
- Coat of arms

Don Luis María Cardinal de Borbón y Vallabriga, Farnesio y Rozas (22 May 1777 – 19 March 1823) was the 14th Count of Chinchón (1785–1803), Grandee of Spain First Class (4 August 1799), with a coat of arms of Bourbon, and 1st Marqués de San Martín de la Vega.

He was born in Cadalso de los Vidrios as the son of a morganatic marriage between Luis de Borbón y Farnesio, Infante of Spain, 13th Count of Chinchón, and María Teresa de Vallabriga y Rozas, Español y Drummond.

== Life and career ==
Until Charles III, King of Spain died in 1788, this Borbón offspring was compelled not to use the family name and since 1785 when his father Luis, the king's brother, died, they had to move to the city of Toledo to be educated under the protection of the Archbishop of Toledo Francisco Antonio de Lorenzana y Butrón. He received his doctorate in canon law.

He was appointed to the following posts:

- Knight of the Illustrious Royal Order of Saint Januarius (1793)
- Knight of the Order of Charles III (1793)
- Archbishop of Seville (26 May 1799 – 19 May 1814)
- Archbishop of Toledo (22 December 1799 – 18 March 1823)
- Primate of Spain (1800)
- Cardinal-Priest of Santa Maria della Scala (pro hac vice to title, 20 October 1800)

He was not present in Rome at the time of his elevation to the rank of cardinal, and the galero, biretta, and ring were sent to him.

Between 1820 and 1823, he played an important role in Spanish liberal politics, abolishing the Inquisition, although the Inquisition was restored again after the French invasion of Spain in 1823 to restore absolutist policies.

He was made a Knight of the Order of the Golden Fleece on 9 July 1820. He died in Madrid aged 45, a few weeks before France invaded Spain and restored Ferdinand VII, and some fifteen years after Napoleon's invasion in May 1808.

The Cardinal-Archbishop officiating the ceremonies related to his promotion in the Church was Antonino de Sentmenat y Cartellá.

He had two sisters:

- María Teresa de Borbón y Vallabriga, Farnesio y Rozas, 15th Countess of Chinchón, painted several times by Francisco Goya who was married in 1797 to Manuel Godoy y Álvarez de Faria, Prince of the Peace, and had a daughter, Carlota de Godoy, 2nd Duchess of Sueca;
- María Luisa de Borbón y Vallabriga y Rozas Español y Drummond, later Duchess Consort of San Fernando de Quiroga by marriage, a title dating back from 1815, without issue.

He died of gout in 1823 and was buried in the sacristy of Toledo Cathedral.

== Gallery ==
Coat of arms.

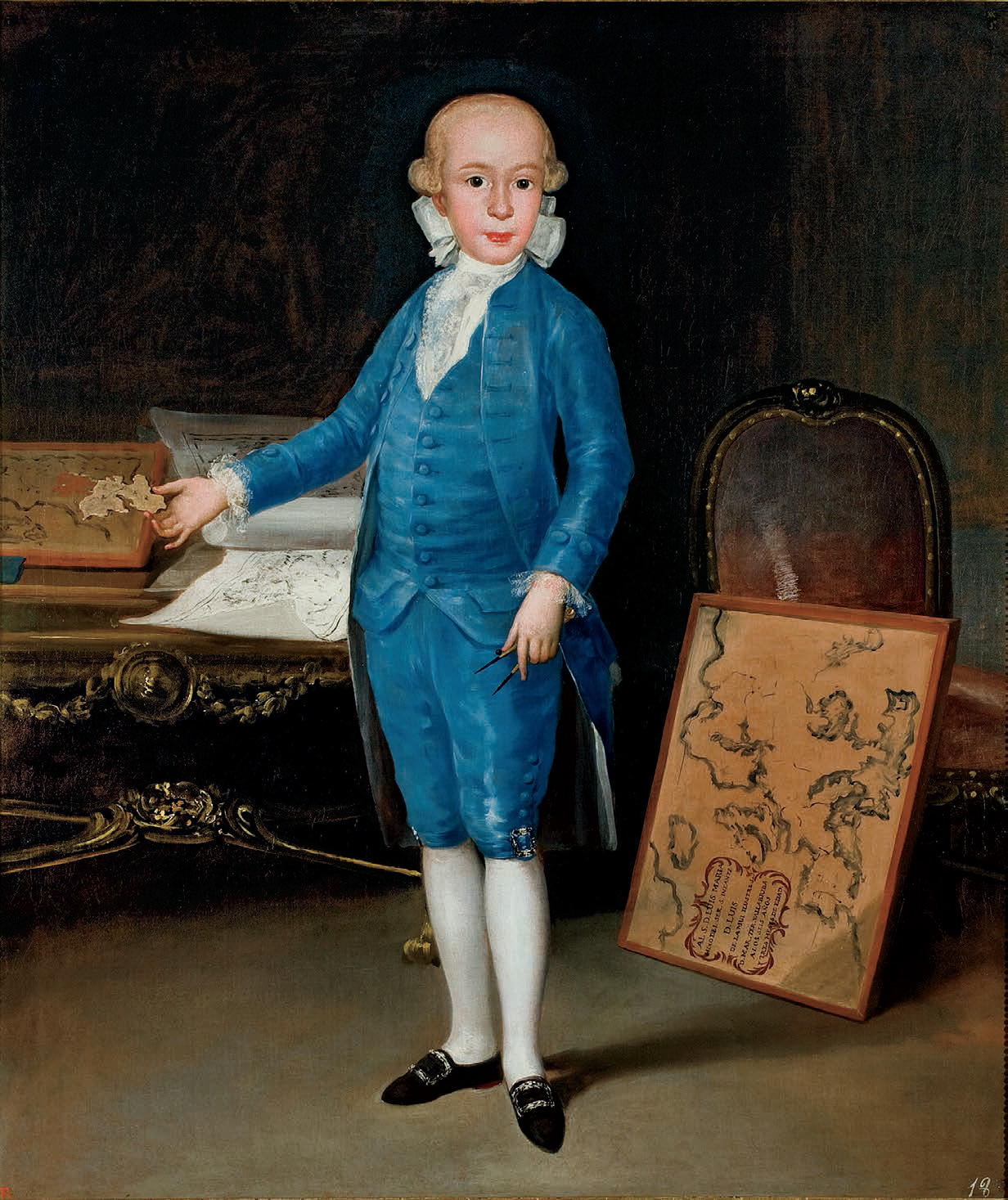
Don Luis María at age 6, as painted by Francisco Goya.

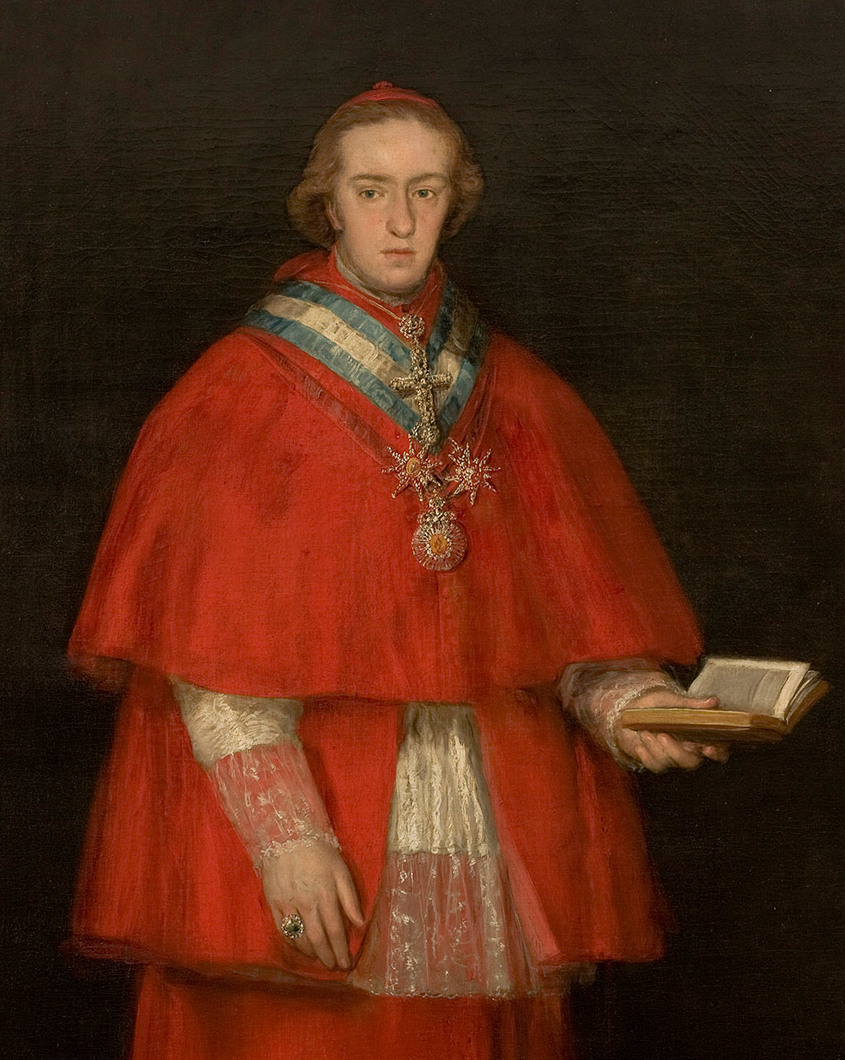
Cardinal Luis Maria de Borbón y Vallabriga, portrait by Francisco Goya, c. 1798-1800
