= Enrique Jaime Ruspoli, 19th Count of Bañares =

Enrique Ruspoli y Morenés
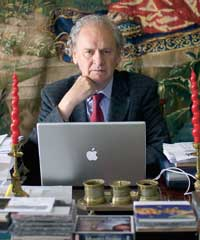
- Enrique Ruspoli y Morenés

19th Count of Bañares
- Reign: 1995–present
- Predecessor: María de Belén Morenés y Arteaga
- Born: February 2, 1935 (age 91); Madrid, Spain
Names
- Enrique Jaime Ruspoli y Morenés
- House: Ruspoli
- Father: Prince Carlos Ruspoli
- Mother: María de Belén Morenés y Arteaga

Don Enrique Jaime Ruspoli y Morenés, Caro y Arteaga, dei Principi Ruspoli (born February 2, 1935) is a Spanish aristocrat, third son of Camilo Ruspoli, 4th Duke of Alcudia and Sueca, and wife Dona María de Belén Morenés y Arteaga, García-Alesson y Echaguë, 18th Countess of Bañares.

He is 19th Count of Bañares with a Coat of Arms of de Zúñiga (Boletín Oficial of March 22, 1995 and Letter of March 30, 1995) and Prince of the Holy Roman Empire. He is a Doctor in Philosophy and a Professor of Philosophy at the Complutense University of Madrid, Gentleman of HH the Pope, Noble Guard, Maestrante of Granada, and Knight of Honour and Devotion of the Sovereign Military Order of Malta.

== Notable published works ==
- La marca del exilio: La Beltraneja, Cardoso y Godoy. ISBN 9780002452885
- Godoy: La lealtad de un gobernante ilustrado. ISBN 9788484603870
- Memorias de Godoy: Primera edición abreviada de memorias críticas y apologéticas para la historia del reinado del señor D. Carlos IV de Borbón. ISBN 9788497347112
- Casa Señoriales de España. ISBN 8425215935

== Additional information ==
=== See also ===
- Ruspoli

=== References ===
- Instituto de Salazar y Castro, Elenco de Grandezas y Titulos Nobiliarios Españoles, Various (periodic publication)

Spanish nobility
Preceded by María de Belén Morenés	Count of Bañares; 1995–present	Succeeded by Incumbent
