= Luis Ruspoli, 7th Marquis of Boadilla del Monte =

Luis Ruspoli y Morenés

7th Marquis of Boadilla del Monte
- Tenure: 1971–2011
- Predecessor: Camilo Ruspoli, 4th Duke of Alcudia and Sueca
- Successor: Luis Carlos Ruspoli, 6th Duke of Alcudia and Sueca
- Born: 28 November 1933; Madrid, Spain
- Died: 25 May 2011 (aged 77); Madrid, Spain
- Spouse: María del Carmen Sanchíz y Núñez-Robres, 13th Marquise of La Casta; Melinda d'Eliassy; Olga Subirana Pita
- Issue: Princess Mónica Ruspoli; Luis Carlos Ruspoli, 6th Duke of Alcudia and Sueca; Princess Maria de Belén Ruspoli; Prince Santiago Ruspoli
Names
- Luis Adolfo Ruspoli y Morenés
- House: Ruspoli
- Father: Camilo Ruspoli, 4th Duke of Alcudia and Sueca
- Mother: María de Belén Morenés y Arteaga, 18th Countess of Bañares

Don Luis Ruspoli dei Principi Ruspoli y Morenés (28 November 1933 – 25 May 2011) was a Spanish aristocrat, second son of Carlos Ruspoli, 4th Duke of Alcudia and Sueca, and wife, María de Belén Morenés y Arteaga, 18th Countess of Bañares.

He was 7th Marquis of Boadilla del Monte, 2nd Baron of Mascalbó.

== Marriages and children ==
He married in Madrid December 2, 1960, and divorced in 1983, Doña María del Carmen Sanchíz y Núñez-Robres (born 1942), 13th Marquise of La Casta, daughter of Hipólito Sánchiz y Quesada, 4th Count of Valdemar, of the Marquises of Vasto, and his wife, Doña María del Pilar Núñez-Robres y Rodríguez de Valcárcel of the Marquises of Montortal and Montenuevo, Counts of Pestagua, and had four children:

- Donna Mónica Ruspoli dei Principi Ruspoli y Sanchíz, (born 1961), married in 1988 with Don Alonso Dezcallar y Mazarredo, Spanish ambassador, and had issue:
  - Doña Mónica Dezcallar y Ruspoli, Mazarredo y Sanchíz (August 9, 1990 –)
  - Doña Belén Dezcallar y Ruspoli, Mazarredo y Sanchíz (September 29, 1994 –)
- Luis Carlos Ruspoli, 6th Duke of Alcudia and Sueca
- Donna María de Belén Ruspoli dei Principi Ruspoli y Sanchíz, (born 1964), married in 1996 with Cesare Passi y Ferrero di Cambiano, Count Passi di Preposulo (born 1950) and had issue:
  - Don Alejandro Passi y Ruspoli, Ferrero di Cambiano y Sanchíz, Count Passi di Preposulo (Madrid, January 6, 1998 –)
  - Donna María del Carmen Passi y Ruspoli, Ferrero di Cambiano y Sanchíz, Countess Passi di Preposulo (Madrid, November 17, 2003 –)
  - Don Luca Passi y Ruspoli, Ferrero di Cambiano y Sanchíz, Count Passi di Preposulo (Madrid, November 20, 2006 –)
- Don Santiago Ruspoli dei Principi Ruspoli y Sanchíz (1971 – 1996), unmarried and without issue.

== Ancestry ==
Ancestors of Luis Ruspoli, 7th Marquis of Boadilla del Monte

16. Camillo Ruspoli, Duke of Sueca
8. Adolfo Ruspoli, 2nd Duke of Alcudia
17. Carlota de Godoy
4. Carlos Ruspoli, 3rd Duke of Alcudia and Sueca
18. Pedro de Alcántara Álvarez de Toledo y Palafox, 17th Duke of Medina Sidonia
9. Rosalía Álvarez de Toledo y Silva Bazán
19. María Joaquina de Silva y Téllez-Girón
2. Camilo Ruspoli, 4th Duke of Alcudia and Sueca
20. Pedro Caro y Salas, 4th Marquiss of La Romana
10. Carlos Caro y Álvarez de Toledo, Count of Caltavuturo
21. María Tomasa Álvarez de Toledo y Palafox
5. María del Carmen Caro y Caro
22. Buenaventura Caro y Caro
11. María de la Encarnación Caro y Gumucio
23. Carmen de Gumucio y Ugarte-Barrientos
1. Luis Ruspoli, 7th Marquis of Boadilla del Monte
24. Antonio Morenés y Pastor, 3rd Baron of las Cuatro Torres
12. Carlos Morenés y Tord, 4th Baron of las Cuatro Torres
25. Catalina de Tord y de Crell
6. Luis Morenés y García-Alesson, 1st Marquis of Bassecourt
26. Carlos García-Alesson y Pinel, 4th Count of the Asalto
13. María Fernanda García-Alesson y Pardo Rivadeneyra, 7th Countess of the Asalto
27. María de los Dolores Pardo de Rivadeneyra y Ruiz de Trocóniz
3. María Belén Morenés y Arteaga, 18th Countess of Bañares
28. Andrés Avelino de Arteaga y Carvajal Vargas, 7th Marquis of Valmediano
14. Andrés Avelino de Arteaga y Silva, 16th Duke of the Infantado
29. Fernanda de Silva y Téllez-Girón,
7. María de las Mercedes de Arteaga y Echagüe, 17th Marquise of Argüeso
30. Rafael Echagüe Bermingham, 1st Count of Serrallo
15. María de Belén Echagüe y Méndez de Vigo
31. María de las Mercedes Méndez de Vigo y Osorio

== Additional information ==
=== See also ===
- Ruspoli

=== Sources ===
- Affonso, Domingos de Araújo; Valdez, Rui Dique Travassos (1938). Livro de Oiro da Nobreza. 3 volumes (in Portuguese). Vol. II. Lisbon.
- Hobbs, Nicolas (2007). "Grandes de España" (in Spanish).
- Instituto de Salazar y Castro. Elenco de Grandezas y Titulos Nobiliarios Españoles (in Spanish). periodic publication.
- "Ruspoli de Godoy Genealogy". 2007.

Spanish nobility
Preceded by Camilo Ruspoli	Marqués of Boadilla del Monte; 1969–2011	Succeeded by Luis Ruspoli y Sanchíz
