= Carlos Ruspoli, 3rd Duke of Alcudia and Sueca =

Carlos Ruspoli y Álvarez de Toledo

3rd Duke of Sueca
- Tenure: 1886–1936
- Predecessor: Carlota Godoy and Bourbon
- Successor: Prince Carlos Ruspoli

3rd Duke of Alcudia
- Tenure: 1914–1936
- Predecessor: Prince Adolfo Ruspoli
- Successor: Prince Carlos Ruspoli
- Born: 1 March 1858; Madrid, Spain
- Died: 10 November 1936 (aged 78); Madrid, Spain
- Spouse: María del Carmen Caro y Caro; Josefa Pardo y Manuel de Villena
- Issue: Princess Rosalía Blanca Ruspoli; Princess María de la Encarnacion Ruspoli; Prince Carlos Ruspoli
Names
- Carlos Luís Ruspoli y Álvarez de Toledo
- House: Ruspoli
- Father: Prince Adolfo Ruspoli
- Mother: Rosalia Álvarez de Toledo y Silva-Bazán

Don Carlos Luis (Carlo Luigi) Ruspoli y Álvarez de Toledo, de Godoy (di Bassano) y Silva-Bazán, dei Principi Ruspoli (1 March 1858 – 10 November 1936) was a Spanish aristocrat, son of Adolfo Ruspoli y Godoy, 2nd Duke of Alcudia, and wife Dona Rosalia Álvarez de Toledo y Silva-Bazán, de Palafox-Portocarrero y Téllez-Girón.

He was 3rd Duke of Sueca (Letter of 31 March 1887), 3rd Duke of Alcudia (Letter of 25 February 1915), with a Coat of Arms of de Godoy, and 17th Count of Chinchón with a Coat of Arms of de Borbón (Letter of 31 March 1887), three times Grandee of Spain First Class and 4th Count of Évoramonte in Portugal de Juro e Herdade with Honours of Relative both in succession of his father, Senator of the Realm by his own right, etc. And Prince of the Holy Roman Empire.

== Marriages and children ==
He married firstly at San Sebastián, on 5 December 1896, his cousin Doña María del Carmen Caro y Caro, Álvarez de Toledo y Gomurcio (Madrid, 18 May 1856/1865 – Madrid, 24 April 1907), daughter of Don Carlos Caro y Álvarez de Toledo, de Salas y Palafox, Count of Caltavuturo and wife and cousin Doña María de la Encarnación Caro y Gomurcio, Caro y Ugarte-Barrientos, both of the Dukes of Montalto, Marquesses of La Romana, etc., descendants of Pedro Caro y Sureda, 3rd marqués de La Romana, and had three children:

- Doña Rosalía Blanca Ruspoli y Caro, Álvarez de Toledo y Caro, dei Principi Ruspoli (Paris, 5 August 1898 – Madrid, 28 June 1926), married at San Sebastián, 16 July 1921 as his first wife her cousin Don Alfonso (Alonso) Cristiano Álvarez de Toledo y Mencos, de Samaniego y Rebolledo (Madrid, 28 November 1896 – Madrid, 2 April 1990), 4th Duke of Zaragoza, 11th Marquess of San Felices de Aragón (Royal Letter of San Sebastián, 16 June 1921), 10th Marquess of Casa Pontejos, 8th Marquess of Lazán, 7th Marquess of Miraflores, 12th Count of Los Arcos, 11th Count of Campo Eril, Grandee of Spain First Class, with a Coat of Arms of Roger de Eril, and had an only daughter
  - Doña María del Rosario Ignacia Álvarez de Toledo y Ruspoli, de Mencos y Caro, 11th Marchioness Casa Pontejos (Madrid, 5 November 1923 – 2017), unmarried and without issue
- Doña María de la Encarnacion Ruspoli y Caro, Álvarez de Toledo y Caro, dei Principi Ruspoli (Madrid, 5 May 1900 – Madrid, 14 February / 5 July 1965), married in Madrid, 16/26 April 1930 Don Mariano del Prado y O'Neill, de Lisboa y Salamanca (Madrid, 15 September 1901 – Madrid, 18 October 1963), 9th Marquess of Acapulco, 10th Marquess of Caicedo 3rd Marquess of Ogijares, 3rd Marquess of Rincon de San Ildefonso and 3rd Count of Buelna, and had seven children:
  - Doña Maria del Carmen del Prado y Ruspoli (1931) She married Don Antonio Zaldó Muriedas. With issue.
  - Don Mariano del Prado y Ruspoli (1933- 1989), 10th Marquess of Acapulco and 4th Count of Buelna. He married Doña Maria Teresa Narváez y Melgar. With issue
  - Don Carlos del Prado y Ruspoli, 11th Marquess of Caicedo. He married Camilla Jessel daughter of Edward Jessel, 2nd Baron Jessel and Helen Vane-Tempest Stewart. With issue.
  - Don Jaime del Prado y Ruspoli (1936-1991) 4thMarquess of Ogijares. He married Irene Martínez y Capriles. With issue.
  - Doña Blanca del Prado y Ruspoli (1939). She married Don Alberto Olalquiaga y Soriano.
  - Don José del Prado y Ruspoli (1940-2008), 4th Marquess of Rincon de San Ildefonso. He married Carlota de Cendra y del Rivero of Marquesses of Casa López. With issue.
  - Doña María Ignacia del Prado y Ruspoli (1945) She married Don Fermín Correas y Rosillo. With issue.
- Camilo Ruspoli, 4th Duke of Alcudia and Sueca

He married secondly in Madrid, 2 July 1911 Doña Josefa Pardo y Manuel de Villena (Madrid, 13 February 1869 – ?), widow of don José de Agrella y ..., ... y ..., daughter of Don Arturo Pardo y de Inchausti, ... y ..., 9th Consort Count of Via Manuel Grandee of Spain First Class, Knight of the Sovereign Military Order of Malta, maestrante of Zaragoza, and wife Dona María Isabel Manuel de Villena y Álvarez de las Asturias-Bohórques, de Bambalere y Guiráldez, 9th Countess of Via Manuel, 13th Marchioness of Rafal, Marchioness of Puebla de Rocamora, Countess of la Granja, 5th Baroness of Monte Villena, Grandee of Spain First Class, without issue.

== See also ==
- Ruspoli

Spanish nobility
Preceded by Adolfo Ruspoli	Duke of Alcudia; 1914–1936	Succeeded by Camilo Ruspoli
Preceded by Carlota de Godoy	Duke of Sueca; 1886–1936	Succeeded by Camilo Ruspoli
