= María Teresa de Borbón, 15th Countess of Chinchón =

María Teresa de Borbón
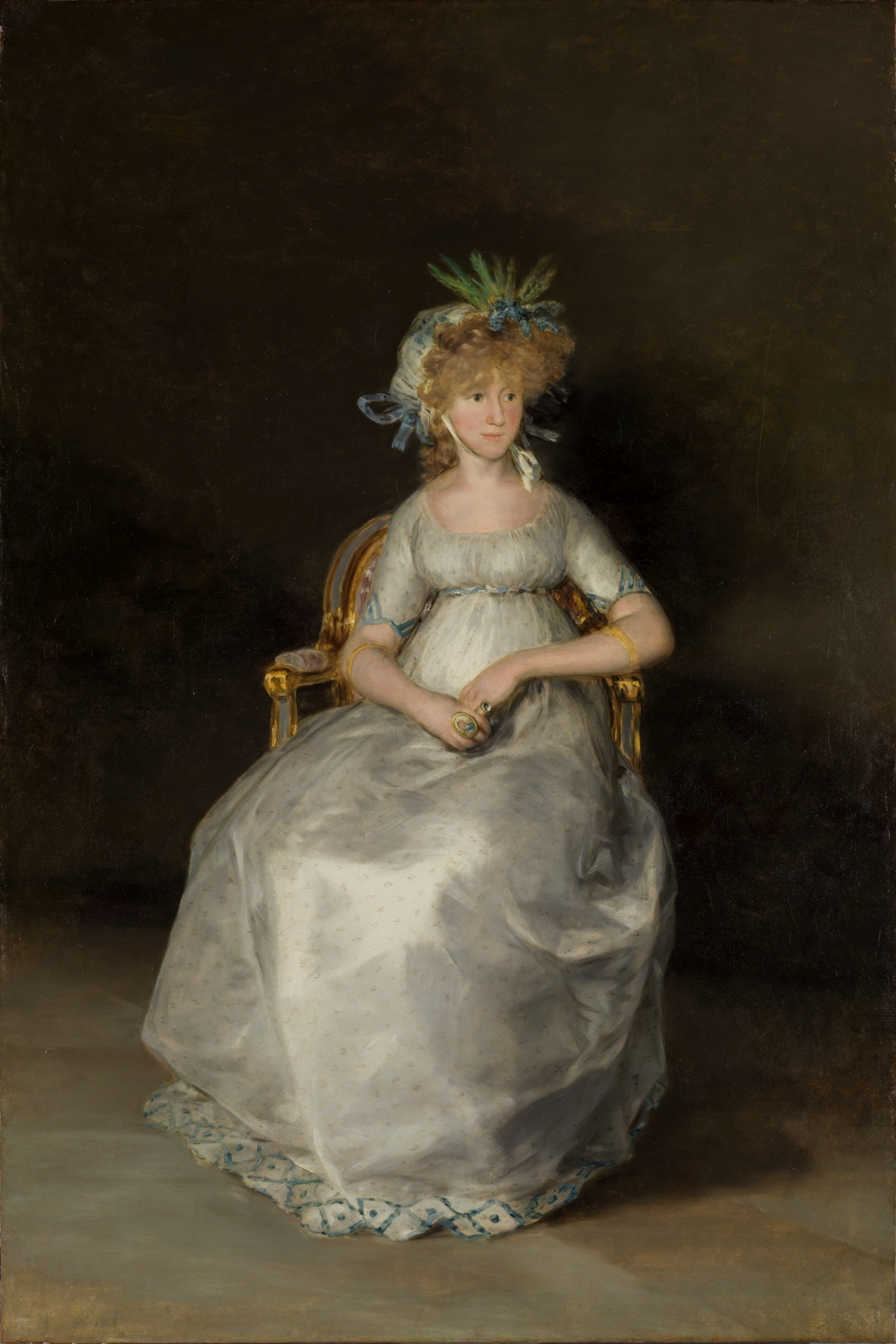
- The Countess of Chinchon, c. 1800

15th Countess of Chinchón
- Tenure: 1823–1828
- Predecessor: Cardinal Luis María de Borbón
- Successor: Carlota de Godoy y Borbón

1st Countess of Boadilla del Monte
- Tenure: 1799–1828
- Successor: Carlota de Godoy y Borbón
- Born: 6 March 1779; Velada, Spain
- Died: 23 November 1828 (aged 49); Paris, Kingdom of France
- Spouse: Manuel Godoy, Prince of the Peace (m. 1797; div. 1808)
- Issue: Carlota de Godoy, 2nd Duchess of Sueca
Names
- María Teresa Carolina de Borbón y Vallabriga
- House: Bourbon
- Father: Infante Luis of Spain
- Mother: María Teresa de Vallabriga

María Teresa de Borbón y Vallabriga, 15th Countess of Chinchón (María Teresa Carolina; 6 March 1779 – 23 November 1828), was a Spanish noblewoman and grandee. She was a patrilineal granddaughter of Philip V of Spain.

== Life and marriage ==
Born in Velada, Toledo, Spain, she was the elder daughter of Infante Luis of Spain and his morganatic wife, the Aragonese aristocrat María Teresa de Vallabriga (5 September 1758 – 16 February 1820). Her father was the 13th Count of Chinchón and a Grandee of Spain First Class.

She had two siblings:

- Luis María de Borbón y Vallabriga, the 14th Count of Chinchón (1785–1803);
- María Luisa de Borbón y Vallabriga y Rozas Español y Drummond, later Duchess Consort of San Fernando de Quiroga by marriage, a title dating back from 1815, without issue (1780–1846)

== Titles ==
Doña María Teresa Carolina de Borbón y Vallabriga, Farnesio y Rozas was:

- the 1st Marquesa of Boadilla del Monte (letters patent of 4 August 1799)
- created the 96th Noble Dame of the Royal Order of Queen Maria Luisa on 10 October 1800 (her younger sister María Luisa was made the 98th Noble Dame on the same day, and her mother was made the 99th Noble Dame on 7 December 1800);
- heir to her brother Luis María's House, and as such the 15th Countess of Chinchón, Grandee of Spain, with the Bourbon coat of arms (letter of 7 March 1804)
- 1st Duchess of Sueca, Grandee of Spain, (letter of 7 March 1804).

== Marriage ==
She was married in the Escorial, Madrid, 2 October 1797, to Don Manuel de Godoy y Álvarez de Faria, 1st Principe de la Paz, 1st Duque de Alcúdia and 1st Duque de Sueca (Badajoz, 12 May 1767 – Paris, 4 October 1851), and had one daughter, Carlota Luisa Manuela.

Maria Teresa had divorced her husband in 1808.

Spanish nobility
New title	Marchioness of Boadilla del Monte; 1799–1828	Succeeded by Carlota de Godoy
Preceded by Luis María de Borbón	Countess of Chinchón; 1823–1828	Succeeded by Carlota de Godoy
