= Infante Luis of Spain =

Infante Luis
- Count of Chinchón
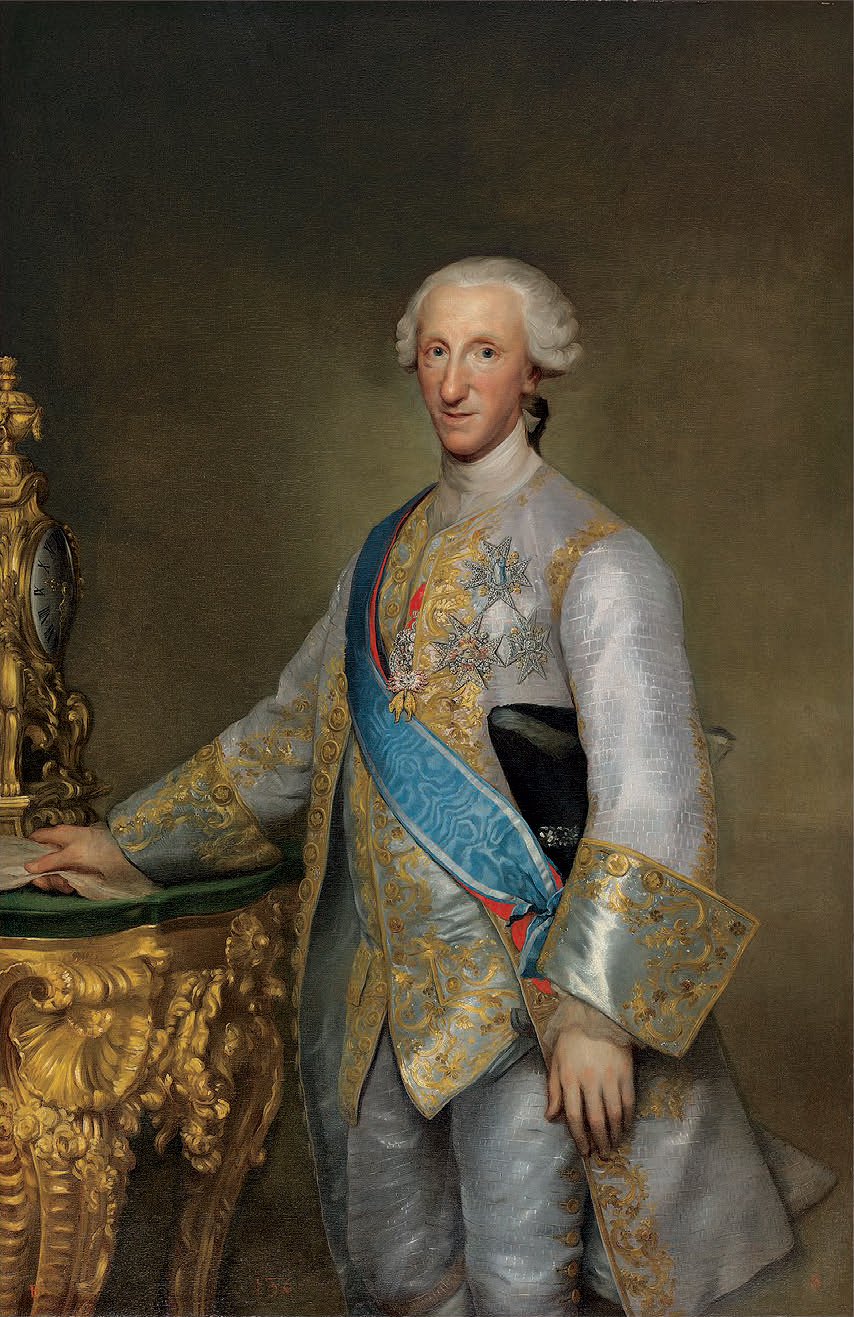
- Portrait by Anton Raphael Mengs, 1776

13th Count of Chinchón
- Tenure: 1761–1785
- Predecessor: Infante Philip of Spain
- Successor: Luis María de Borbón y Vallabriga
- Born: 25 July 1727; Seville, Spain
- Died: 7 August 1785 (aged 58); Palacio de la Mosquera, Arenas de San Pedro, Ávila
- Burial: El Escorial
- Spouse: María Teresa de Vallabriga (m. 1776)
- Issue: Luis María de Borbón, 14th Count of Chinchón; María Teresa de Borbón, 15th Countess of Chinchón; María Luisa de Borbón, Duchess of San Fernando
Names
- Luis Antonio Jaime de Borbón y Farnesio
- House: Bourbon
- Father: Philip V of Spain
- Mother: Elisabeth Farnese
- Religion: Roman Catholicism

Infante Luis, Count of Chinchón (Luis Antonio Jaime de Borbón y Farnesio; 25 July 1727 – 7 August 1785), known as the Cardinal Infante, was a Spanish infante and clergyman. He was a son of Philip V of Spain and his second wife, Elisabeth Farnese. He was cardinal deacon of Santa Maria della Scala, as well as administrator of the temporal affairs, and later also of the spiritual affairs, of the Archdiocese of Toledo, the primatial see of Spain.

He is listed in the Guinness Book of World Records as the youngest-ever cardinal.

== Life ==
=== Early years ===
Luis Antonio Jaime de Borbón y Farnesio was born the youngest son of Philip V, King of Spain, and his second wife, Elisabeth Farnese. While barely eight years of age, Luis was created 699th Knight of the Order of the Golden Fleece in 1735 and named administrator of the temporal affairs of the Archdiocese of Toledo on 10 November of the same year, and on 19 December of that year he was created cardinal deacon of Santa Maria della Scala, although he did not receive the red biretta until 23 March 1736 in Madrid, having previously in that year taken formal possession of the archdiocese on 13 March. On 26 November 1737 he was named administrator of the spiritual affairs of the archdiocese. On 18 December 1754 he abandoned the ecclesiastical life for lack of vocation, renounced his ecclesiastical titles and dignities and assumed the title of 13th Conde de Chinchón (Count of Chinchón) granted by his brother Infante Felipe.

When his older half-brother King Ferdinand VI died without issue in 1759, Luis claimed the throne on the grounds that he was the only surviving son of Philip V still residing in Spain (his older brothers were Charles, King of Naples and Sicily, and Philip, Duke of Parma, both reigning in Italy). However valid his claim, Luis lost the succession to his oldest brother Charles, while Charles's third son became Ferdinand I of the Two Sicilies.

Infante Luis was a patron of the arts and culture, and admirer of musician Luigi Boccherini, architect Ventura Rodríguez and painters Francisco de Goya, Luis Paret y Alcázar, and Charles Joseph Flipart.

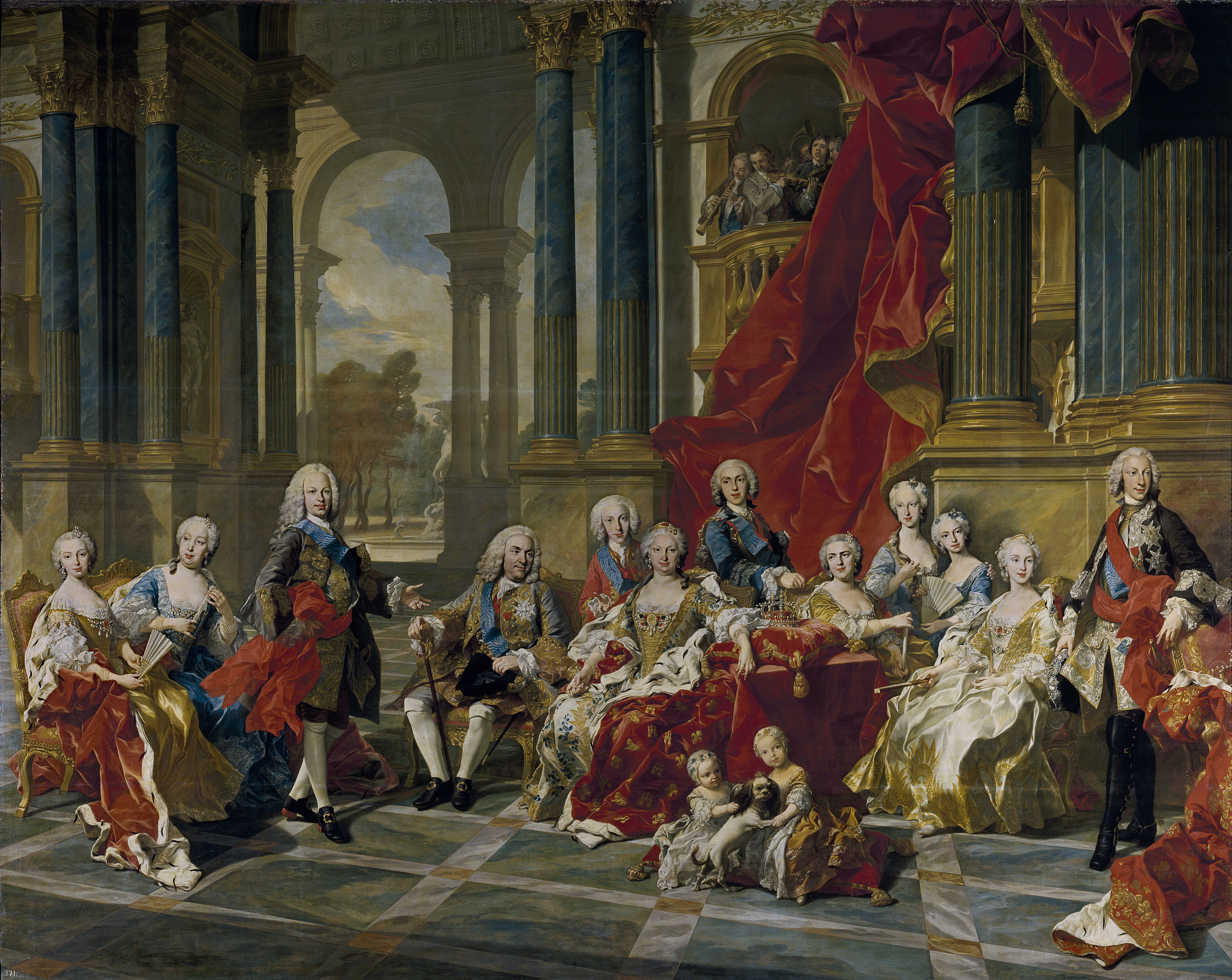
The Family of Philip V; Luis is fifth from left

== Marriage ==
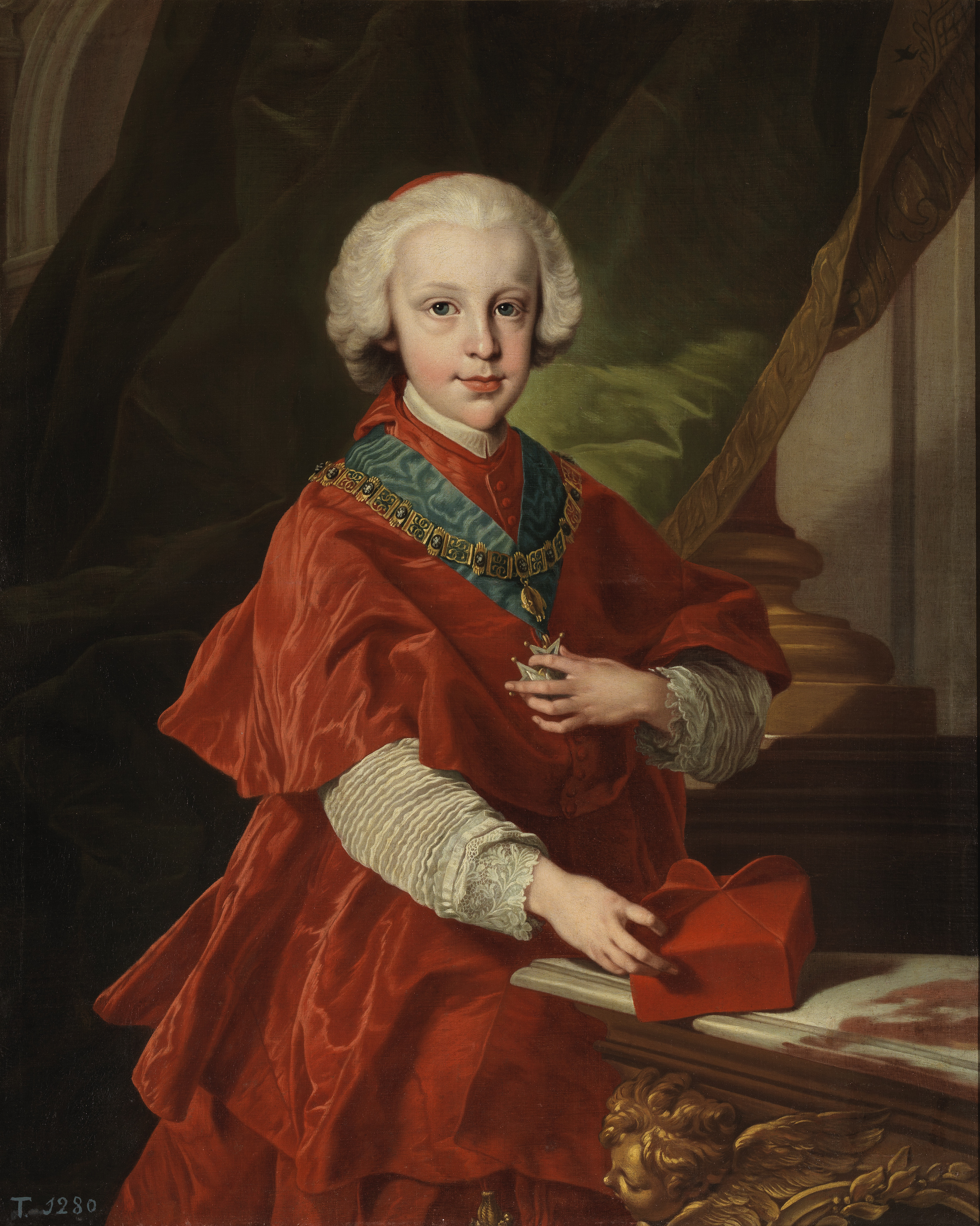
Cardinal Infante Don Luis of Spain, Archbishop of Toledo and Primate of Spain, by Louis Michel van Loo

King Charles III, fearful of his brother, exiled Luis far away from the Court of Madrid. In 1776 at Olias del Rey Luis contracted a morganatic marriage with an Aragonese aristocrat, María Teresa de Vallabriga. This was much to the liking of Charles, because Luis now could not have children with a better claim to the throne.

=== Children ===
Since Luis's children had been born of a morganatic marriage, they could not receive royal titles, and thus the descendants of Charles were the legitimate Spanish heirs (even though the children of Charles had been born in Naples). The couple had four children:

1. Luis María de Borbón y Vallabriga, 14th Count of Chinchón (Cadalso de los Vidrios, 1777 – Madrid, 1823), he renounced his title and became Cardinal, Archbishop of Toledo;
2. a stillborn;
3. María Teresa de Borbón y Vallabriga, 15th Countess of Chinchón; married in the Escorial, Madrid, 2 October 1797 Manuel de Godoy y Álvarez de Faria, 1st Principe de la Paz, 1st Duque de Alcúdia and 1st Duque de Sueca (Badajoz, 12 May 1767 – Paris, 4 October 1851), and had issue, an only daughter Carlota Luisa Manuela.
4. María Luisa de Borbón y Vallabriga (Toledo, 21 March 1780 – Paris, 1 December 1846), 98th Noble Dame of the Royal Order of Queen María Luisa on 10 October 1800, married in 1817 Joaquín José de Melgarejo y Saurín, de Rojas y Ruíz-Dávalos (Cox, Alicante, 23 January 1780 – Madrid, 9 April 1835), 3rd Marqués de Melgarejo and 1st Duke of San Fernando de Quiroga Grandee of Spain First Class with a Coat of Arms of de Melgarejo, 39th Minister of External Affairs of Spain (12 September 1819 – 18 March 1820), without issue. She was the last surviving grandchild of Philip V of Spain.

Charles had a great deal of appreciation and devotion to his younger brother, and even during his exile, Luis was treated quite well by the Spanish court. Luis loved his brother equally as much, which is why Luis later accepted Charles as king and accepted his exile. Despite this, Luis remained bitter and saddened by the fact that he lost the opportunity to be king. Luis died disgraced and in internal exile in 1785.

Arms of the Infante Luis of Spain, as Cardinal and Archbishop of Toledo

Coat of Arms of the Infante Luis after he abandoned the ecclesiastical life

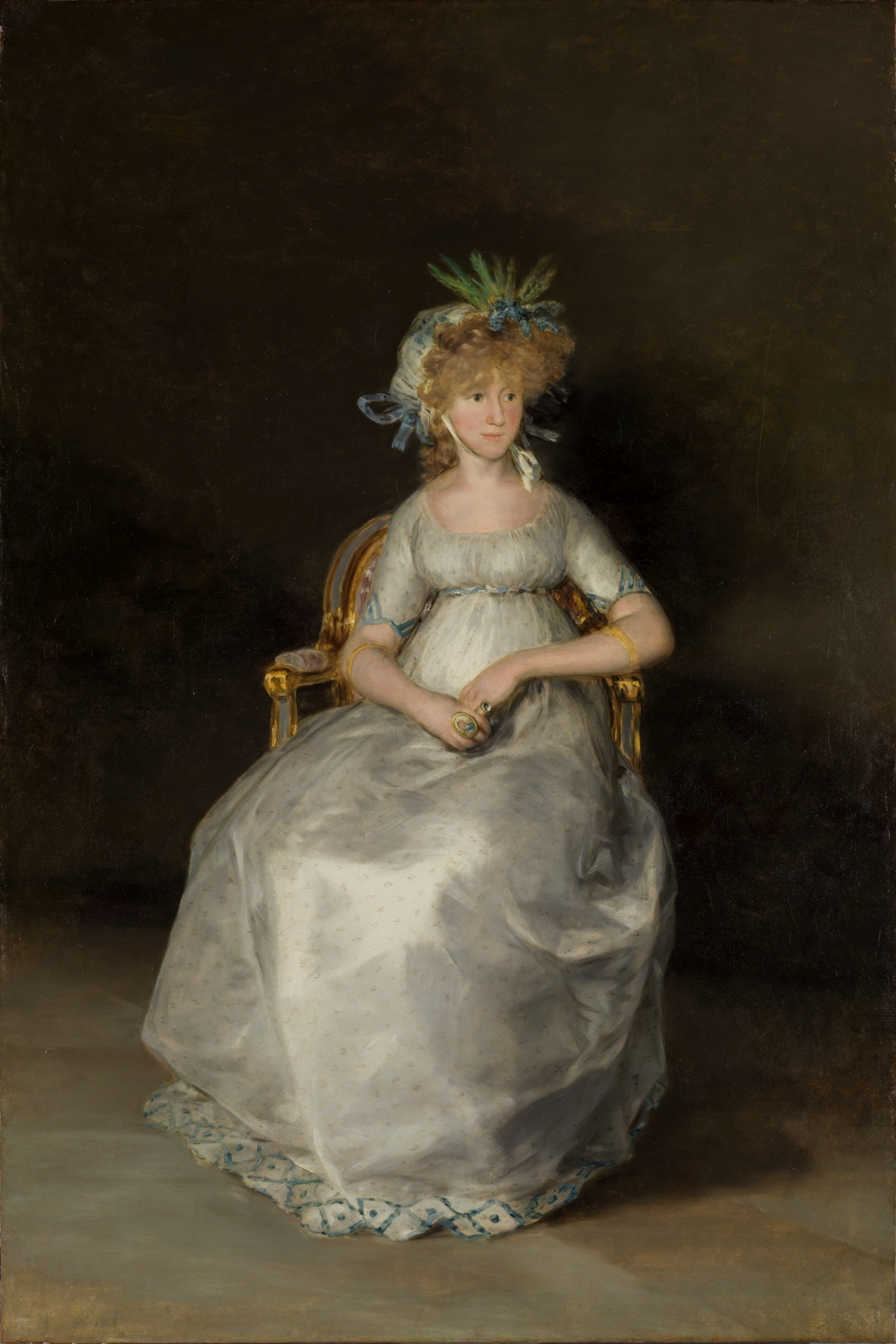
Dona María Teresa – eldest daughter

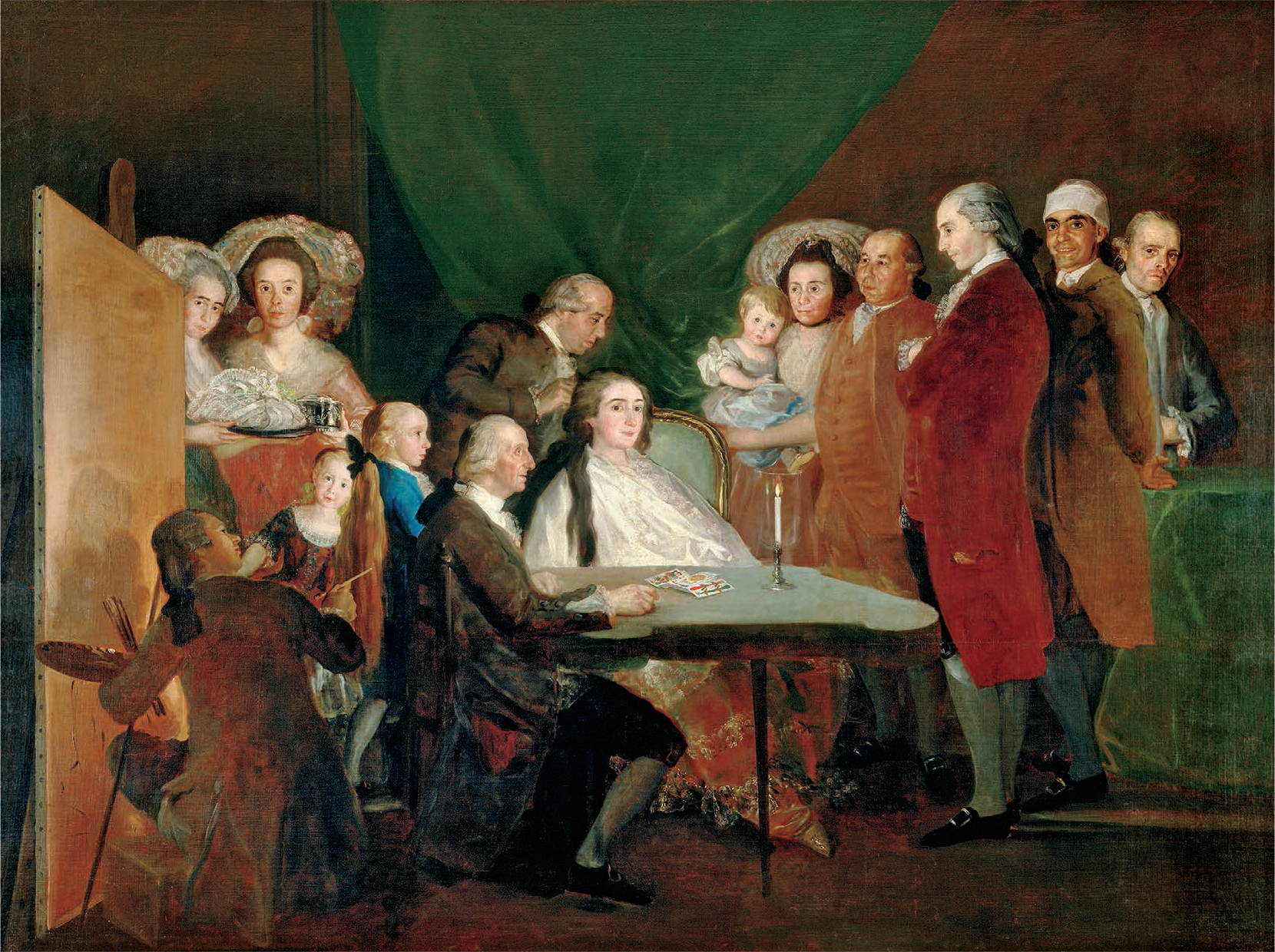
The family of Infante Don Luis, as painted by Goya in 1784

== Ancestors ==
Ancestors of Infante Luis of Spain

8. Louis XIV of France
4. Louis, Dauphin of France
9. Maria Theresa of Austria
2. Philip V of Spain
10. Ferdinand Maria, Elector of Bavaria
5. Maria Anna Victoria of Bavaria
11. Henriette Adelaide of Savoy
1. Infante Luis of Spain
12. Ranuccio II Farnese, Duke of Parma
6. Odoardo Farnese, Hereditary Prince of Parma
13. Isabella d'Este
3. Elisabeth Farnese
14. Philip William, Elector Palatine
7. Dorothea Sophie of Neuburg
15. Elisabeth Amalie of Hesse-Darmstadt
