= Carlota de Godoy, 2nd Duchess of Sueca =

Spanish noble

Carlota de Godoy y Borbón
- Duchess of Sueca
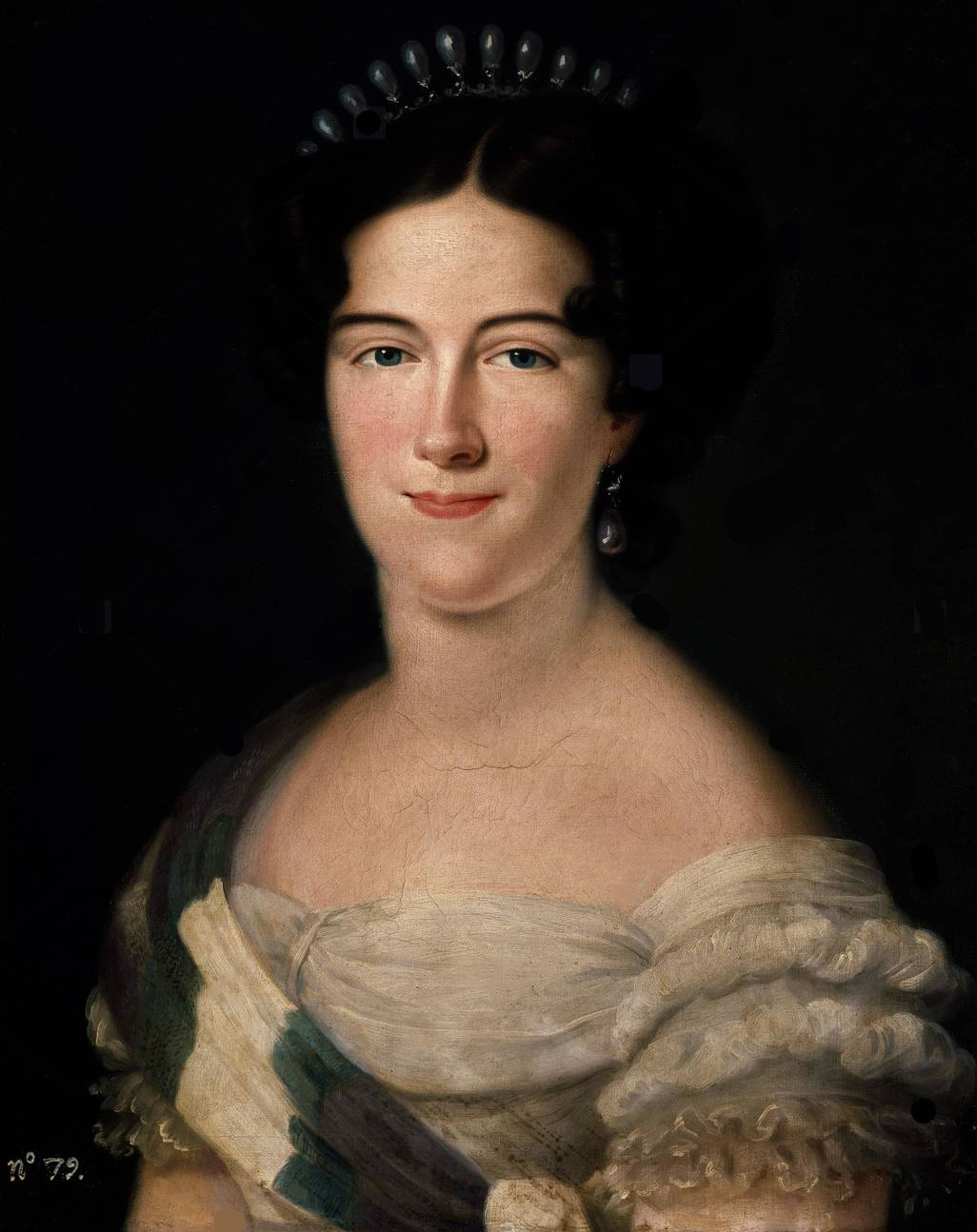
- Carlota de Godoy y Borbón, 1817

2nd Duchess of Sueca
- Tenure: 1851–1886
- Predecessor: Manuel de Godoy y Álvarez de Faria Rios
- Successor: Prince Carlos Ruspoli
- Born: 7 October 1800; Madrid, Spain
- Died: 13 May 1886 (aged 85); Paris, France
- Spouse: Prince Camillo Ruspoli (m. 1821; died 1864)
- Issue: Prince Adolfo Ruspoli; Prince Luigi Ruspoli
- Carlota Luisa Manuela de Godoy y Borbón
- House: Godoy; Ruspoli (by marriage)
- Father: Manuel de Godoy y Álvarez de Faria Rios
- Mother: Doña María Teresa Carolina de Borbón y Vallabriga

Carlota de Godoy y Borbón, 2nd Duchess of Sueca, twice Grandee of Spain (in full, Spanish: Doña Carlota Luisa Manuela de Godoy (di Bassano) y Borbón, segunda duquesa de Sueca, segunda marquesa de Boadilla del Monte, segunda condesa de Evoramonte, com honras de parente (Portugal), dama de la Orden de María Luisa y de la Orden de Santa Isabel de Portugal; 7 October 1800 – 13 May 1886) was a Spanish aristocrat, daughter of Manuel de Godoy and his first wife, Doña María Teresa Carolina de Borbón y Vallabriga, Farnesio y Rozas.

She inherited her mother's titles and / or representations and all of her father's Spanish and Portuguese titles and / or representations, and was the 97th Noble Dame of the Royal Order of Queen María Luisa on 10 October 1800, 2nd Countess de Évora Monte in Portugal de Juro e Herdade with Honours of Relative, 2nd Duchess of Sueca (Letter of 18 July 1830), three times Grandee of Spain First Class (Royal Cedule of 14 March 1831), 16th Countess de Chinchón with a Coat of Arms of de Borbón (Letter of 1831), 2nd Marchioness of Boadilla del Monte (Confirmation of 22 October 1852 and Letter of 30 April 1853, which she had previously obtained already, through the cession of her mother, and which she gave to her son Luis), Señora de Chinchón and of the eleven villages of this State, of Boadilla del Monte and its jurisdictions, lady of numerous villages and jurisdictions, Dame of the Order of Saint Isabel Queen of Portugal.

== Marriage and children ==
She wasn't authorized by the King of Spain to marry into a Royal House, but instead it was permitted that she married in Madrid on November 18/8, 1821, Don Camillo (Camilo) Ruspoli y Khevenhüller-Metsch, Marescotti-Capizucchi y Liechtenstein, dei Principi Ruspoli (Rome, 30 March 1788 – Florence, 30 July 1864), Chief of Squadron of the Dragoon Regiment of Pope Leo XII, Knight of Justice of the Order of St. John of Jerusalem, Maestrante of Granada, Grand Cross of the Order of Charles III, Gentleman of the Chamber of the Emperor of Austria, authorised by the Kings of Spain to use his wife's titles, third son of Francesco, Principe Ruspoli y Marescotti-Capizucchi, Cesi y Sacchetti and second wife H.Ill.H. Countess Leopoldina von Khevenhüller-Metsch y Liechtenstein, de Metsch y Dietrichstein-Weichselstädt zu Hollenburg und Finkenstein, and had issue, two sons, ancestor of the Line II of the Principi Ruspoli:

- Adolfo Ruspoli, 2nd Duke of Alcudia
- Luigi Ruspoli, 3rd Marquis of Boadilla del Monte

== See also ==
- Ruspoli

Spanish nobility
Preceded by Manuel de Godoy	Duchess of Sueca; 1851–1886	Succeeded by Carlos Ruspoli
Preceded by María Teresa de Borbón	Countess of Chinchón; 1828–1886	Succeeded by Carlos Ruspoli
Preceded by María Teresa de Borbón	Marchioness of Boadilla del Monte; 1828–1886	Succeeded by Luigi Ruspoli
