= Count of Bañares =

Spanish nobility title

- Creation date: 1485
- Created by: Catholic Monarchs of Spain
- Peerage: • Zúñiga (House of Béjar and Plasencia) • Pimentel (House of Benavente) • Téllez-Girón (House of Osuna) • Arteaga, marquises of Argüeso (minor line of the dukes of El Infantado, former marquises of Valmediano) • Morenés, marquises of Bassecourt (minor line of the barons of the Cuatro Torres) • Ruspoli, princes of Holy Roman Empire (minor line of the princes of Cerveteri, with the Barony of Marescotti, of the Count house of Vignanello, and Ruspoli junction, with the Marquisate of Cerveteri)
- First holder: Álvaro de Zúñiga y Guzmán
- Present holder: Enrique Rúspoli y Morenés, (XIX Count since 1995)

The Count of Bañares is a nobility title of the Kingdom of Spain, created by Enrique IV of Castile in 1469 and confirmed by the Catholic Monarchs in 1485 in favor of Álvaro de Zúñiga y Guzmán, I Duke of Arévalo, I Duke of Béjar and I Duke of Plasencia (title granted over the previous Count of Plasencia, of which he was its II Count).

His name refers to the municipality of Bañares, in La Rioja.

The title was reinstated by King Alfonso XIII in 1917, in favor of María de las Mercedes de Arteaga y Echagüe, XVII Marquise of Argüeso, XIV Marquise of Campoo, XIV Countess of Villada.

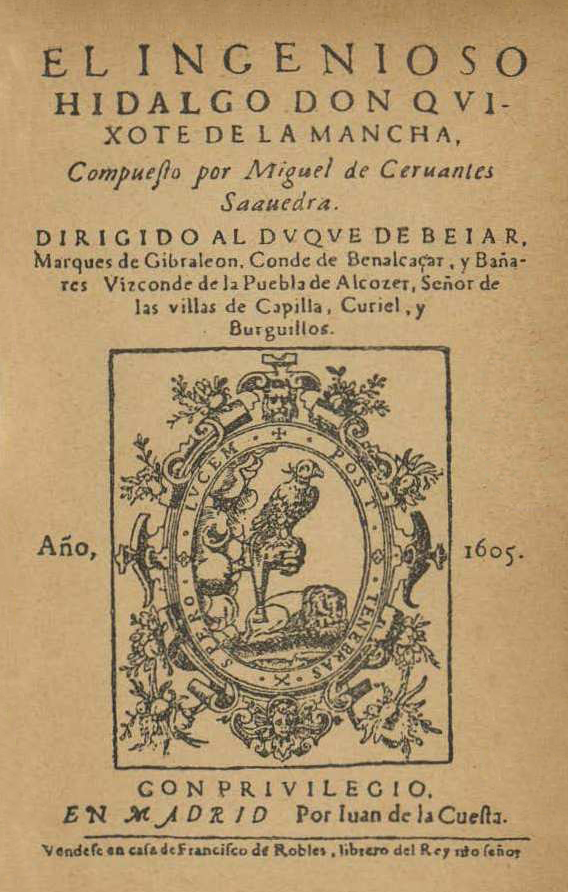
Don Quixote dedicated to the Count of Bañares.

== Counts of Bañares ==
	Holder	Time period
Concessed by the Catholic Monarchs
I	Álvaro de Zúñiga y Guzmán	1469–1478
II	Pedro de Zúñiga y Manrique de Lara	1478–1484
III	Álvaro de Zúñiga y Pérez de Guzmán	1484–1532
IV	Teresa de Zúñiga y Manrique de Lara	1532–1565
V	Francisco de Zúñiga y Sotomayor	1565–1591
VI	Francisco Diego López de Zúñiga Sotomayor y Mendoza	1591–1601
VII	Alfonso López de Zúñiga y Pérez de Guzmán	1601–1619
VIII	Francisco López de Zúñiga y Mendoza	1619–1636
IX	Alfonso López de Zúñiga y Mendoza	1636–1660
X	Juan Manuel López de Zúñiga y Mendoza	1660–1664
XI	Manuel López de Zúñiga y Sarmiento de Silva	1664–1686
XII	Juan Manuel López de Zúñiga y Castro	1686–1747
XIII	Joaquín López de Zúñiga y Castro	1747–1777
XIV	María Josefa Pimentel y Téllez-Girón	1777–1834
XV	Pedro de Alcántara Téllez-Girón y Beaufort Spontin	1834–1844
XVI	Mariano Téllez-Girón y Beaufort Spontin	1844–1882
Rehabilitation by Alfonso XIII
XVII	María de las Mercedes de Arteaga y Echagüe	1917–1934
XVIII	María Belén Morenés y Arteaga	1934–1995
XIX	Enrique Rúspoli y Morenés	present holder

== Family tree ==
Álvaro de Zúñiga, 1st Duke of Béjar and Plasencia; 1410–1588
Pedro de Zúñiga, 2nd Count of Bañares (1430–1484)
Álvaro de Zúñiga, 2nd Duke of Béjar, 3rd Count of Bañares; 1455–1531	Francisco de Zúñiga, 1st Marquis of Ayamonte d. 1525
Teresa de Zúñiga, 3rd Duchess of Béjar, 5th Count of Bañares; 1502–1565
Francisco de Zúñiga Sotomayor, 4th Duke of Béjar, 5th Count of Bañares; 1530–1591
Francisco Diego de Zúñiga, 5th Duke of Béjar, 6th Count of Bañares; 1560–1601
Alfonso Diego de Zúñiga, 6th Duke of Béjar, 7th Count of Bañares; 1578–1619
Francisco Diego de Zúñiga, 7th Duke of Béjar, 8th Count of Bañares; 1596–1636
Alfonso de Zúñiga, 8th Duke of Béjar, 9th Count of Bañares; 1621–1660	Juan Manuel de Zúñiga, 9th Duke of Béjar, 10th Count of Bañares; 1622–1660
Manuel Diego de Zúñiga, 10th Duke of Béjar and 11th Count of Bañares; 1657–1668	Manuela de Zúñiga, Countess Duchess of Benavente d. 1712
Juan Manuel de Zúñiga, 11th Duke of Béjar and Plasencia, 12th Count of Bañares; 1680–1747	Antonio Francisco Pimentel, 10th Count Duke of Benavente d. 1743
Joaquín de Zúñiga, 12th Duke of Béjar and Plasencia, 13th Count of Bañares; 1715–1771	Francisco Pimentel, 11th Count Duke of Benavente; 1707–1763
María Josefa Pimentel, Duchess of Osuna, 12th Countess Duchess of Benavente, 13th Duchess of Béjar and Plasencia, 14th Countess of Bañares; 1752–1834
María Joaquina Téllez-Girón, Marchioness of Santa Cruz; 1784–1817	Francisco de Borja Téllez-Girón, 10th Duke of Osuna; 1785–1820	Pedro de Alcántara Téllez-Girón, 2nd Prince of Anglona; 1786–1851; With succession to Dukes of Osuna and Béjar.
Fernanda de Silva, Marchioness of Valmediano; 1808–1879	Pedro de Alcántara Téllez-Girón, 11th Duke of Osuna, 14th Duke of Béjar and Plasencia, 15th Count of Bañares; 1810–1844	Mariano Téllez-Girón, 12th Duke of Osuna, 15th Duke of Béjar and Plasencia, 16th Count of Bañares; 1814–1882	Tirso Téllez-Girón, Duke of Uceda; 1817–1871
Andrés Avelino de Arteaga, XVI Duke of El Infantado (1833–1910)
María de las Mercedes de Arteaga, XVIII Marchioness of Argüeso, XVII Countess of Bañares (1869–1948)	Joaquín de Arteaga, XVII Duke of El Infantado (1870–1947); With succession in the Duchy of El Infantado.
María Belén Morenés, Duchess of Sueca, XVIII Countess of Bañares (1906–1999) (1869–1948)	Luis Morenés, XIX Marquis of Argüeso (b. 1903); With succession in the marquises of Argüeso.
Carlos Rúspoli, V Duke of Alcudia and Sueca (b. 1932)	Luis Ruspoli y Morenés, VI Marquis of Boadilla del Monte (1933–2011)	Enrique Rúspoli y Morenés, XIX Count of Bañares (b. 1935)
Luis Rúspoli y Sanchiz, VI Duke of Sueca (b. 1963)
Carlos Rúspoli y Álvarez de las Asturias Bohorques, VII Duke of Alcudia (n. 1993)
