= Costanzi =

Costanzi is a surname. Notable people with the surname include:

- Carlo Costanzi (1705–1781), Italian gem engraver
- Giovanni Costanzi (1674–1754), Italian gem engraver
- Giovanni Battista Costanzi (1704–1778), Italian composer and cellist
- Giulio Costanzi (1875–1965), Italian spaceflight scientist
- Placido Costanzi (1702–1759), Italian painter
- Tommaso Costanzi (1700–1747), Italian gem engraver
