= Gualdi =

Gualdi is an Italian surname. Notable people with the surname include:

- Abbe Gualdi, a pseudonym of Gregorio Leti (1630–1701), Italian historian and satirist
- Domenico Gualdi (born 1974), Italian former professional racing cyclist
- Giovanni Gualdi (born 1979), former Italian male long-distance runner
- Mirco Gualdi (born 1968), Italian former professional racing cyclist
- Nana Gualdi (1932–2007), German singer and actress
- Pietro Gualdi, aka Pedro Gualdi (1808–1857), Italian-born artist, panorama painter, architect and lithographer active in Mexico City
- Pietro Gualdi Lodrini (1716–circa 1784), Italian painter
