= Carlo Sellitto =

Italian painter (1581–1614)

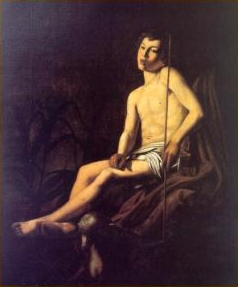
- St. John the Baptist, 1601. 150×125 cm. Private collection.
- Born: 1581; Montemurro, Basilicata, Italy
- Died: 2 October 1614 (aged 32–33); Naples

Carlo Sellitto (1581 – 2 October 1614 in Naples) was an Italian painter of the Baroque period.

One of the most gifted followers of Michelangelo Merisi da Caravaggio (1571–1610), Sellitto played an important role in the spread of Caravaggism to Naples and in the development away from Late Mannerism to a greater naturalism.

The son of a painter and gilder, he was apprenticed briefly to the Piedmontese painter Giovanni Antonio Ardito (c. late 16th century–early 17th) before moving (c. 1591) to the studio of the Flemish painter Louis Croys. By 1608, at the age of 27 years, he had left Croys and had set up his own workshop in the Via Donnalbina, attracting to it such artists as Filippo Napoletano, Giovan Mattea Arciero (b 1591) and Francesco Abbenante (first decade of the 17th century). The talent for portraiture that Sellitto had shown while working with Croys brought him commissions from the court and aristocracy, although none of these documented works has been identified.

Sellitto would have known Caravaggio during the artist's exile in Naples in 1606/1607, but the date indicates that this Baptist (illustrated) was painted several years previously – cf. Caravaggio's own treatment of the theme of John the Baptist.

He died on 2 October 1614 after a brief 6-year independent career.
