= Ratti family =

Italian noble family

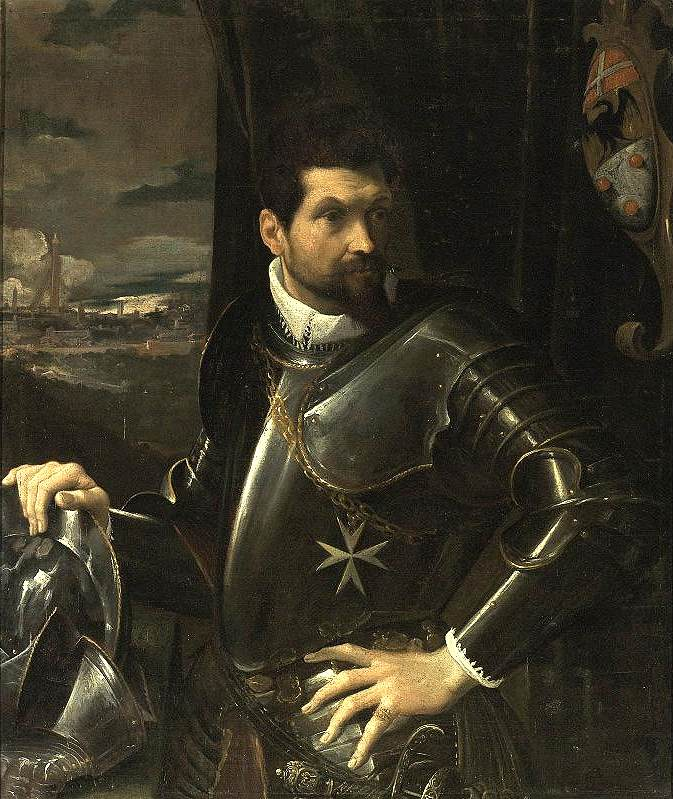
Carlo Alberto Ratti Opizzoni with the Ratti Opizzoni coat of arms (upper right). In 1592 he became a Knight Hospitaller and had a successful military career, actively campaigning against the Turks.

Ratti is a family of chiefly Italian extraction. The earliest evidences of the family are related to Piedmont (11th century) and Liguria (12th century). A minor branch originates from Premana, where it was recorded since the early 15th century. Mentone, Opizzone and Lizoli are the major offshoots of the family. Among the eminent members are Giovanni Agostino Ratti, Carlo Giuseppe Ratti and Pope Pius XI (Ambrogio Damiano Achille Ratti).

== History ==
All major offshoots utilized their own coats of arms and mottos. The earliest known Ratti Mentone offshoot comes from Menton in France. This branch's motto is Virtus beatos efficit (Latin: Boldness makes blissfulness). The Ratti Opizzone (Ratti Oppizzoni or Ratti Opizzoni) branch was recorded in Tortona since 13th century. Its mansion, the Torre Ratti Castle in Piedmont, was built before 1155. It was renovated and expanded in the 14th century and again two centuries later. The castle belonged to Ratti Opizzoni till 1868. The Ratti Opizzone mottoes are Omnia cum tempore (All with time) and Sub tuum praesidium (Under thy protection). In Como a branch of the family devoted itself to silk-spun production since 19th century.
