= Camillo Ruspoli, 2nd Prince of Candriano =

Camillo Ruspoli

Prince of Candriano
- Tenure: 1 October 1920 – 5 September 1949
- Predecessor: Giuseppe Caracciolo
- Successor: None
- Born: 10 January 1882; Rome, Kingdom of Italy
- Died: 5 September 1949 (aged 67); Havana, Cuba
- Spouse: Marie Marguerite Blanc
- Issue: Prince Emanuele Alberto Ruspoli
Names
- Camillo dei Principi Ruspoli
- House: Ruspoli
- Father: Prince Emanuele Ruspoli
- Mother: Laura Caracciolo

Camillo dei Principi Ruspoli (10 January 1882 – 5 September 1949), was the 2nd and last Principe di Candriano and Prince of the Holy Roman Empire, son of Emanuele Ruspoli, 1st Prince of Poggio Suasa, and second wife Laura Caracciolo dei Principi di Torella, Duchi di Lavello, Marchesi di Bella.

His maternal uncle, Giuseppe Caracciolo (1849 – 1920), Patrizio Napolitano, married twice and without issue, was the 1st Prince of Candriano (formerly Marquis of Candriano) (12 May 1893 – 1 October 1920).

== Biography ==
Ruspoli belonged to the noble Roman and Florentine Ruspoli family. He was the sixth son of Emanuele Ruspoli, 1st Prince of Poggio Suasa, a politician, and his second wife, Donna Laura Caracciolo dei Principi di Torella.

In January 1920, Camillo arrived in Havana on the steamship Governor Cobb, from Key West. He bought a citrus farm in Ceballos, Ciego de Ávila, then belonging to the province of Camagüey. He established his residence on Avenida del Río Almendares, no. 8.

In 1920 Ruspoli was a Deputy to Congress, for the province of Avellino. He had been a member of the army as Captain of Engineers and was awarded the Croix de Guerre.

Regarding his position before Mussolini's Government, he stated to Diario de la Marina, on February 5, 1929:

“Every good Italian must honestly recognize that Benito Mussolini is the true savior of Italy. He, using healthy methods of nationalist reconstruction and harmonizing the old struggle between capital and labor, avoided the dissolution of the Kingdom that seemed inevitable due to the nefarious communist doctrines that were rapidly spreading in Italy.”

Camillo presided over the Italian Assistance Society that helped his countrymen living in Havana with economic difficulties, especially children.

According to a 1938 intelligence report compiled by the U.S. War Department, Ruspoli was the leader of a Blackshirts organization in Cuba. Membership consisted of "600 men of Italian blood or sympathy". The organization hosted local radio broadcasts, spoken in both Spanish and Italian.

On April 23, 1942, the Diario de la Marina reported in a brief note, and with distance:

"…The Italian prince Camilo Ruspoli has been arrested and imprisoned as a dangerous foreigner. The police accuse him of being one of the directors of fascism in America. He has lived for years in Cuba where he owns many properties. The prince has a collection of yachts that the police have seized."

On September 4, 1949, Ruspoli died at his Havana residence.

== Marriage and child ==
In Rome, on 29 April 1905, he married Baronne Marie Marguerite Blanc (daughter of French Baron Albert Blanc and wife Natalia Terry y Dorticós) (Madrid, 7 May 1884 – 22 November 1961), by whom he had an only son:

- Don Emanuele Alberto dei Principi Ruspoli (Rome, 24 February 1906 – Paris, 31 August 1929), unmarried and without issue. Died from typhoid fever.

== Notable published works ==
He composed the ballet fantasy Festival of the Gnomes (which was orchestrated, conducted and recorded by Les Baxter in 1951).

== Ancestry ==
Ancestors of Camillo Ruspoli, 2nd Prince of Candriano

16. Alessandro Ruspoli, 2nd Prince of Cerveteri
8. Francesco Ruspoli, 3rd Prince of Cerveteri
17. Prudenza dei Conti Marescotti-Capizucchi
4. Prince Bartolomeo Ruspoli
18. John Sigismond, 2nd Prince of Khevenhüller-Metsch
9. Countess Maria Leopoldina von Khevenhüller-Metsch
19. Princess Maria Amalia of Liechtenstein
2. Emanuele Francesco Ruspoli, 1st Prince of Poggio Suasa
10. Valerio Ratti
5. Carolina Ratti
11. Luigia Masucci
1. Prince Camillo Ruspoli, 2nd Prince of Candriano
24. Nicola Caracciolo, 6th Duke of Lavello
12. Giuseppe Caracciolo, 7th Prince of Torella
25. Teresa Carafa-Cantelmo-Stuart dei Principi di Roccella
6. Camillo Caracciolo dei Principi di Torella
26. Antonio Cristoforo Saliceti
13. Caterina Saliceti
27. Laura Berio dei Marchesi di Salza
3. Laura Caracciolo dei Principi di Torella
14. Count Ivan Loginov
7. Countess Anna Ivanovna Loginova
15. Aleksandra Illin

== See also ==
- Ruspoli

Italian nobility
Preceded by Giuseppe Caracciolo	2nd Prince of Candriano; 1 October 1920 – 5 September 1949	Succeeded by Last
