= Raimondo Ghelli =

Italian painter

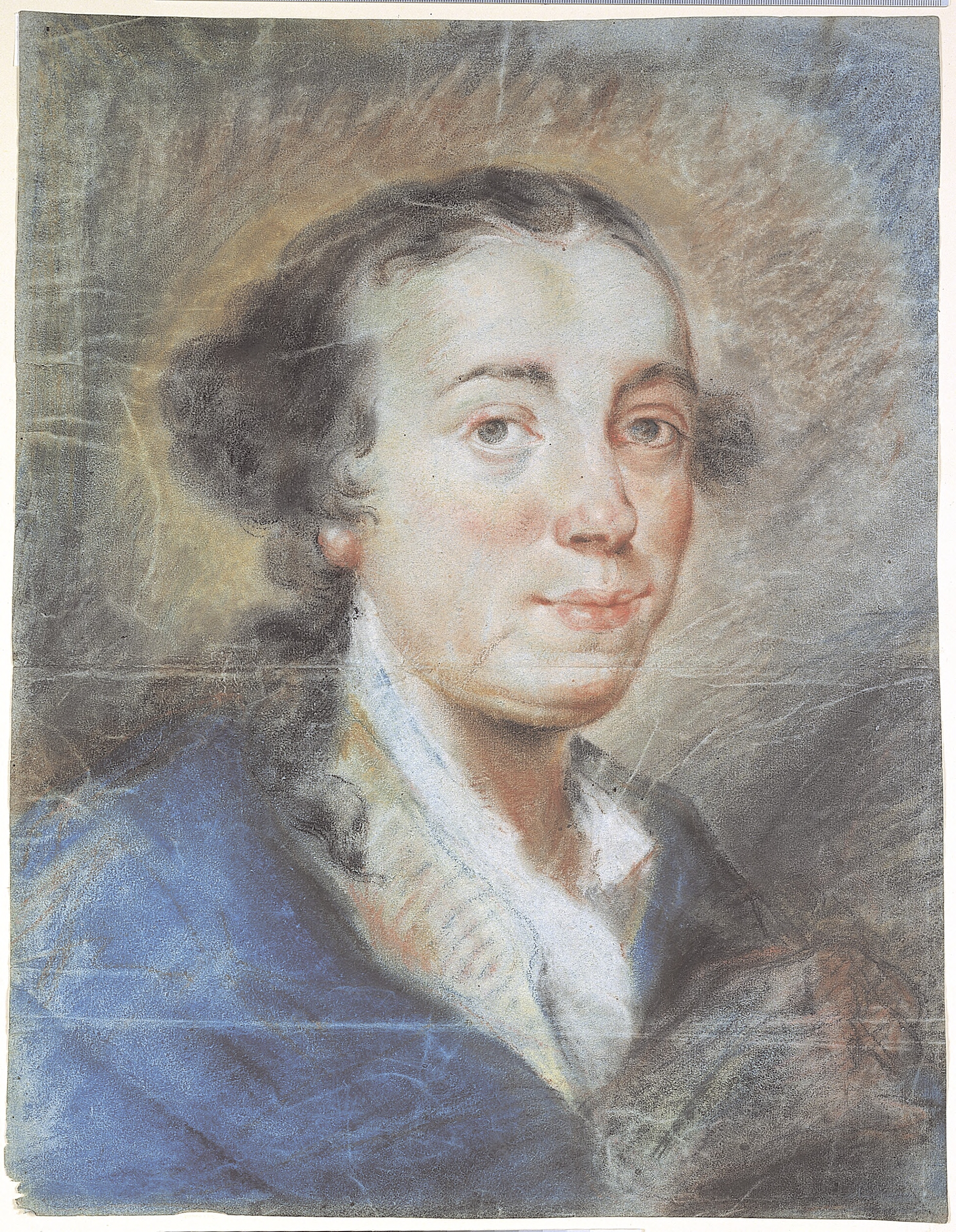
A 1789 pastel portrait of Ghelli by Giuseppe Ratti (National Gallery of Denmark)

Raimondo Ghelli (active second half of 18th century) was an Italian engraver and painter of the 18th century, active in making portraits.

He was a pupil of Giuseppe Ratti in Genoa, and helped engrave many of the portraits for the Vite dei pittori genovesi by Raffaele Soprani. He moved to Ferrara to paint the portrait of Cardinal Riminaldi and also made portraits of G. Parini, Giuseppe Mosti, and Antonio and Feliciano Montecatini. He was active in Ferrara after 1750. He was also an art restorer, and taught his restoration techniques to Margherita Sutter Bernini. Some of his portraits are displayed in the Pinacoteca Nazionale di Ferrara and the Musei Civici di Arte Antica.
