= Pietro Gualdi Lodrini =

Italian painter (1716–1784)

Pietro Antonio Gualdi Lodrini (23 December 1716 – c. 1784) was an Italian painter, mainly active in Bergamo as a painter of sacred subjects during the Rococo or late-Baroque period.

== Biography ==
He was born in Nembro, near Bergamo, and trained in painting portraits under Fra Galgario. After five years, he moved to Rome, where he worked under Placido Costanzi, a pupil of Benedetto Luti. Returning to Bergamo, he painted altarpieces for a number of churches in the region, including: the Chiesa del Carmine, Bergamo; the parish church of Alzano Lombardo; the parish church of Bonate Sopra; the parish church of Spirano; the parish church of Colognola; the church of Bariano; and for the bishop's chapel in Fara Gera d'Adda.
