= Carlo Costanzi =

Italian gem engraver

Carlo Costanzi (1705–1781) was an Italian gem engraver of the late-Baroque period.

He was born to a family of gem-makers and artists in Naples. His father Giovanni and brother Tommaso were also a gem engravers, while his other brother Placido became a painter. Carlo later moved and worked the rest of his life in Rome. He obtained commissions from the major European courts.
