= Tommaso Costanzi =

Italian gem-engraver

Tommaso Costanzi (1700–1747) was an Italian gem engraver of the late-Baroque period.

He was born to a family of gem-makers and artists in Naples. His father Giovanni and brother Carlo were also a gem engravers, while his other brother Placido became a painter. Tommaso later moved and worked the rest of his life in Rome. None of his works survive, but he was noted in documentation by Giovanni Pichler.
