= Carlo Giuseppe Ratti =

Italian painter (1737–1795)

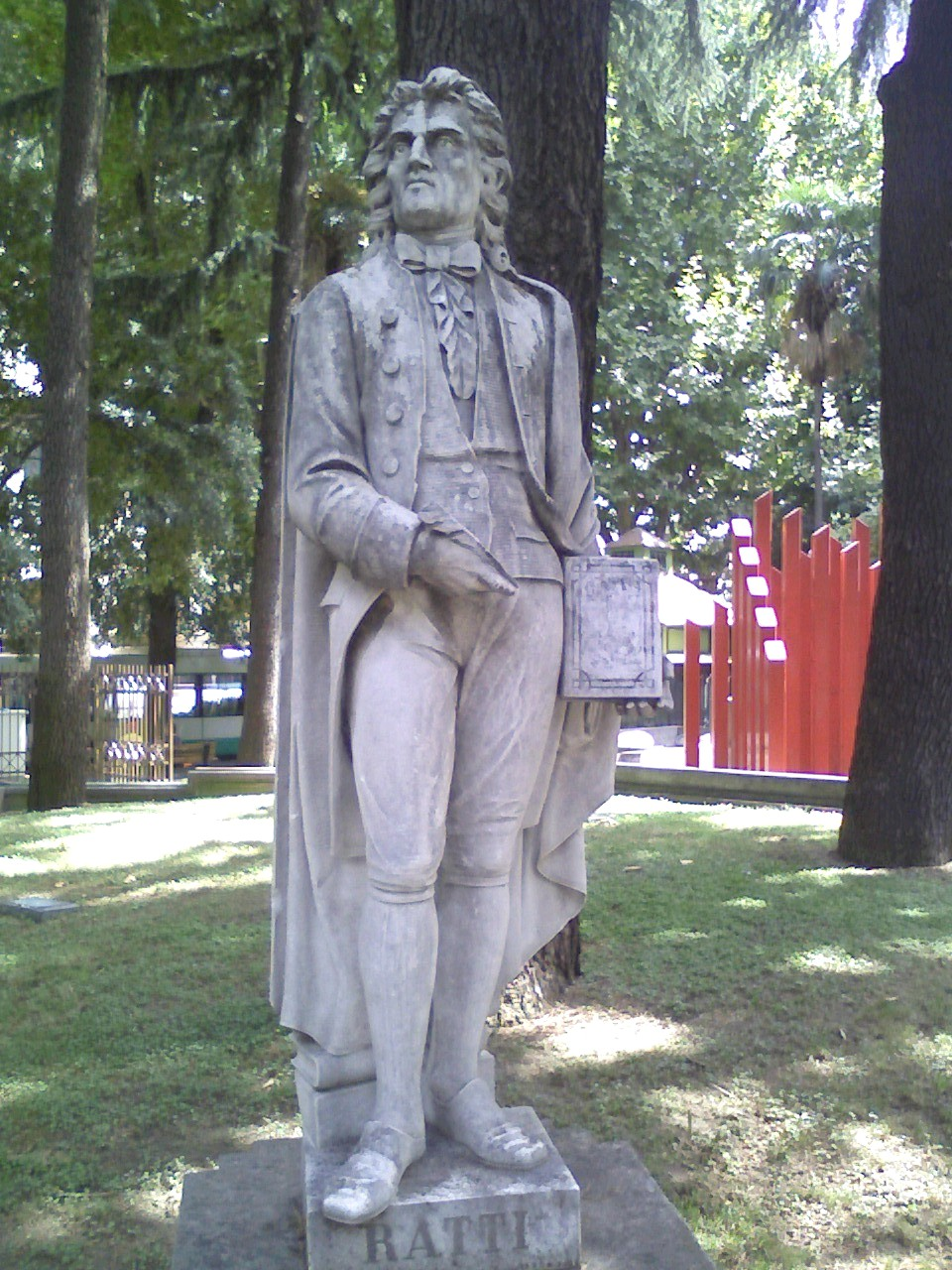
- Statue of Carlo Giuseppe Ratti in Savona
- Born: 27 November 1737; Savona, Republic of Genoa
- Died: 24 September 1795 (aged 57); Genoa, Republic of Genoa
- Education: Placido Costanzi
- Known for: Painting; History of art
- Movement: Baroque; Neoclassicism

Carlo Giuseppe Ratti (27 November 1737 – 24 September 1795) was an Italian art biographer and painter of the late-Baroque period.

== Biography ==
Carlo Giuseppe Ratti was born in Genoa on 27 November 1737. He was the son of the painter Giovanni Agostino Ratti, director of the Scuola di Pittura of the Accademia Ligustica di Belle Arti (founded 1751 ) in Genoa, and received his training from his father and in an apprenticeship with Placido Costanzi in Rome (1756–9). While in Rome he became a close friend and follower of Anton Raphael Mengs, Pompeo Batoni and Johann Joachim Winckelmann; his friendship with them inspired his interest in historiography as part of a theoretical-historical programme to make Genoese art more widely known throughout Europe and to reform and rejuvenate the local artistic tradition through the academy.

With this in mind, Ratti prepared his Istruzione (1766), the first guidebook to Genoa, and Descrizione (1780), an accompanying guide to the Italian Riviera. Both are divided into itineraries that focus attention on selected ‘classical’ works of art from the early 16th century to his own time, with little mention of Genoa’s rich medieval heritage. While much of his information about specific artists and works was based on Raffaele Soprani’s Vite de' pittori, scultori ed architetti genovesi (1674), Ratti wrote a historical-descriptive narrative, as though he were actually walking through Liguria.

His major work, the second edition (1768–9) of Soprani’s Vite, contains his footnoted comments, corrections and additions to Soprani and continues to function as a critical base for modern Genoese art studies. Ratti published also A Life of Rafael Mengs, and Notices of Correggio. He corresponded with Luigi Lanzi, providing information regarding the artworks and painters in Liguria for Lanzi's Storia Pittorica dell'Italia.

In recognition of his scholarship, e was knighted by Pope Pius VI and made director of the Scuola di Pittura of the Accademia Ligustica di Belle Arti in 1775. As director of the Scuola di Pittura, Ratti sought to reform the standard curriculum. His Neoclassical style of painting, blended with influences from the Genoese Baroque tradition, can be seen in his eight scenes from the Lives of St Peter and St. Catherine (c. 1778–82; Savona, oratory of the Santi). One of his pupils was the portraitist Raimondo Ghelli.

== Works ==
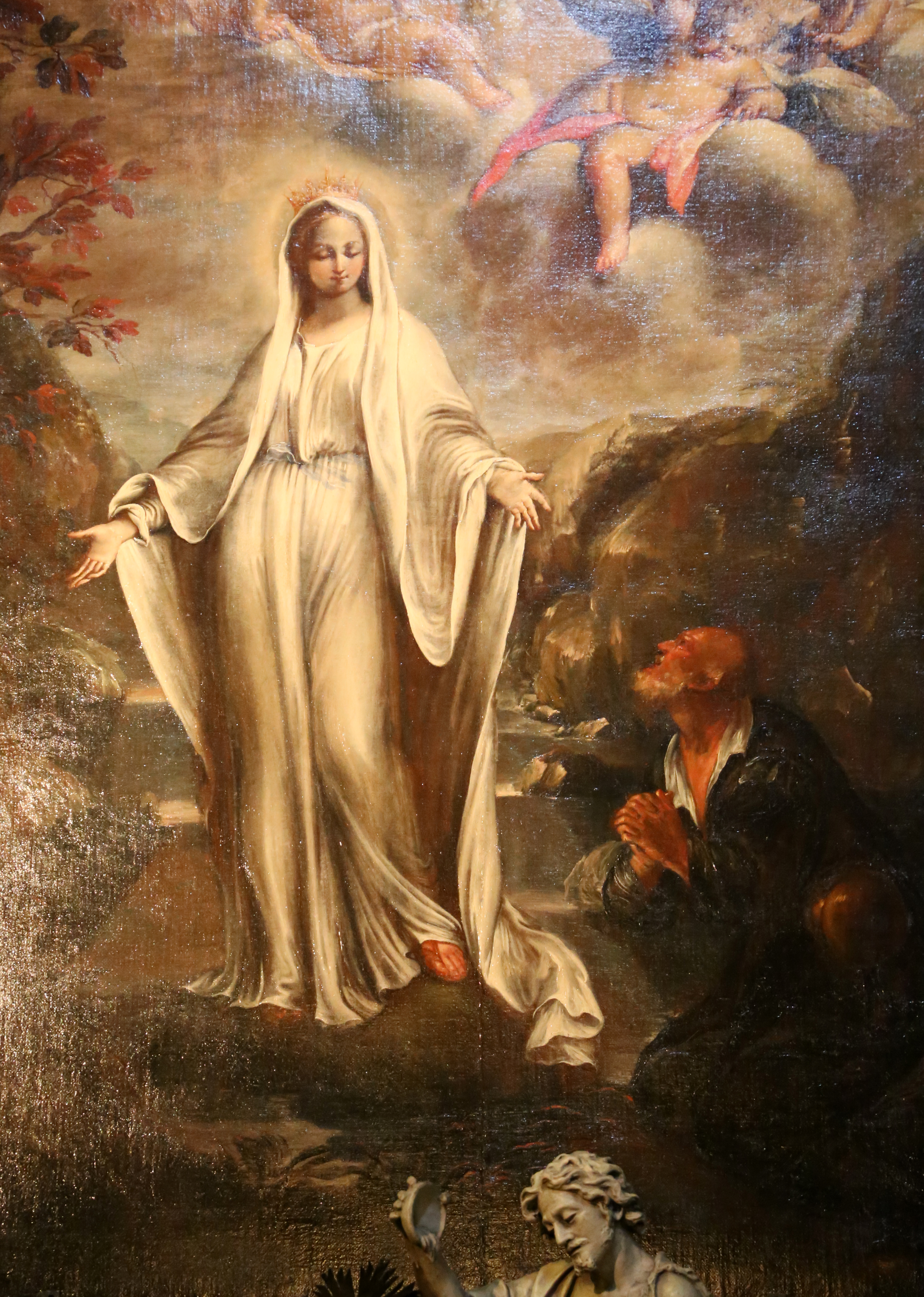
Apparition of the Virgin, San Giovanni Battista in San Domenico, Savona

Writings:

- Storia de' pittori scultori et architetti liguri e de' forestieri che in Genova operarono (1762)
- Ratti, Carlo Giuseppe (1780). L'istruzione di quanto può vedersi di bello in Genova. (first published 1766), Presso Ivone Gravier, sotto la Loggia di Banchi, Genoa.
- Ratti, Carlo Giuseppe (1780). Descrizione delle pitture, scolture e architetture etc., che trovansi in alcune città, borghi, e castelli delle due riviere dello stato Ligure. Presso Ivone Gravier, sotto la Loggia di Banchi, Genoa.
- Notizie Storiche Sincere Intorno La Vita E Le Opere Del Celebre Pittore Antonio Allegri Da Correggio (1781)
- Epilogo della vita del su cavalier Antonio Raffaello Mengs, primo pittor di Camera de Sua Maesta Cattolica (1779)

Paintings:

- Birth of the Virgin, Church of San Giovanni Battista, Savona
- Scenes from the Life of Saints Peter and Catherine, (1782) Oratory of Santissimi Pietro e Caterina, Savona
- Decorations in Sala Minore of the Consiglio of Ducal Palace, Genoa
- Hercules and Cacus e Ercole vince Atlante, Palazzo Rosso
- Annunciation and Trinità e Santi, Basilica of Santa Maria delle Vigne, Genoa
- Scenes from the Life of St Antony Abbott, Oratory of Sant'Antonio Abate, Mele
- Nativity, Commenda di San Giovanni di Pré

== Bibliography ==
- Farquhar, Maria (1855). Ralph Nicholson Wornum (ed.). Biographical catalogue of the principal Italian painters. London: Woodfall & Kinder. p. 142.
- Carlo Giuseppe Ratti. Storia de' pittori scultori et architetti liguri e de' forestieri che in Genova operarono, secondo il manoscritto del 1762, a cura di Maurizia Migliorini, Genova 1997
- De Boni (1840). Biografia degli artisti. Venezia.
- Pesenti (1971). La pittura a Genova e in Liguria dal Seicento al primo Novecento. Genova.
