= Antonio Travi =

Italian painter (1613–1668)

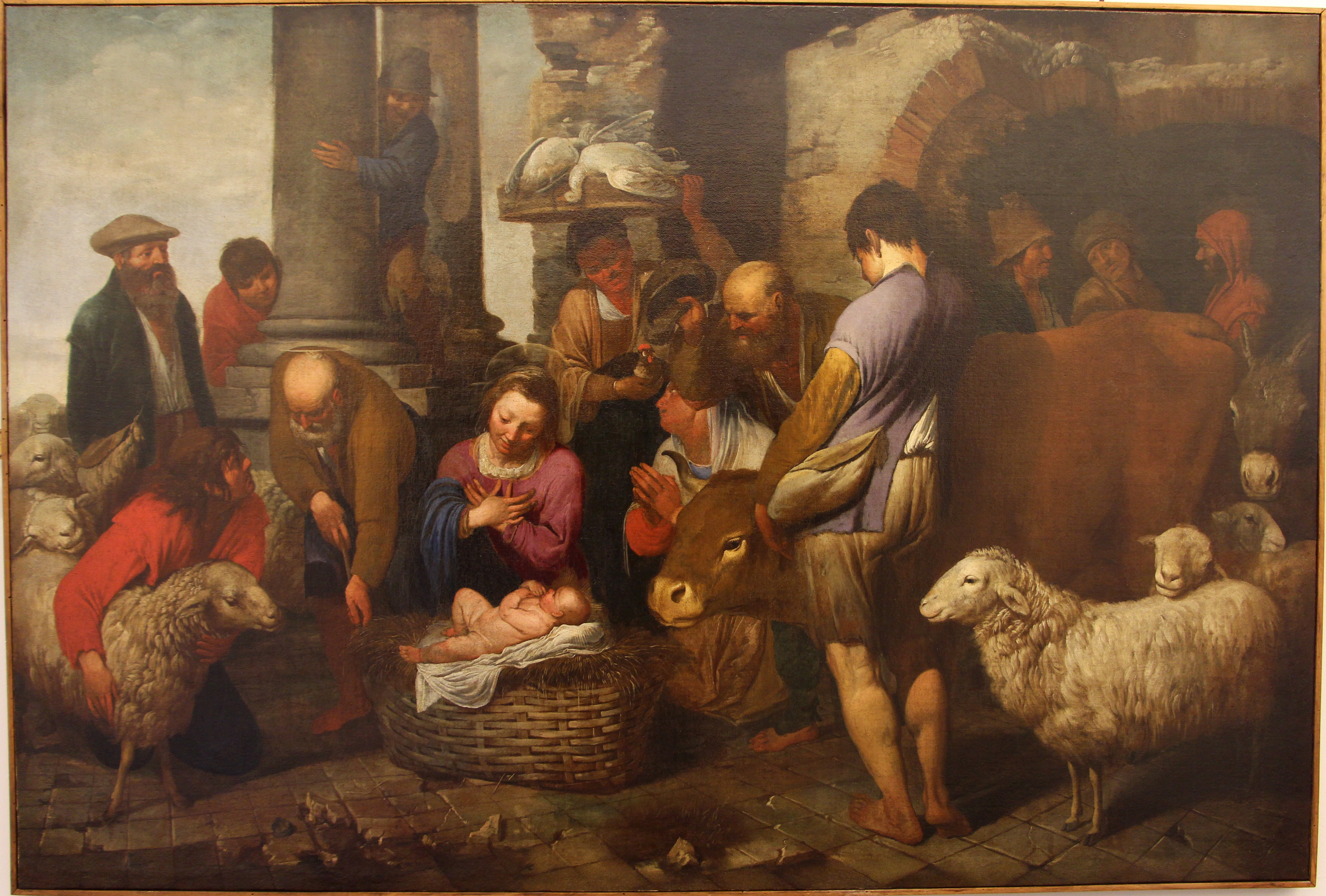
The Adoration of the Shepherds

Antonio Travi (1613–1668) was an Italian painter of the Baroque period. He was born in Sestri, near Genoa, was generally known as Il Sordo di Sestri on account of his deafness. He was originally a color-grinder to Bernardo Strozzi, who instructed him in design, and he afterwards studied landscape painting under Gottfried Wals. His son Antonio was also a landscape painter.
