= Giovanni Costanzi =

Giovanni Costanzi (1674–1754) was an Italian gem engraver of the late-Baroque period.

He was the head of a family of gem-makers and artists in Naples. His sons Carlo and Tommaso were also a gem engravers, while his other son Placido became a painter. Giovanni later moved and worked the rest of his life in Rome. One of his commissions was for Frederick the Great.
