= Pietro Bianchi (painter) =

Italian painter (1694–1740)

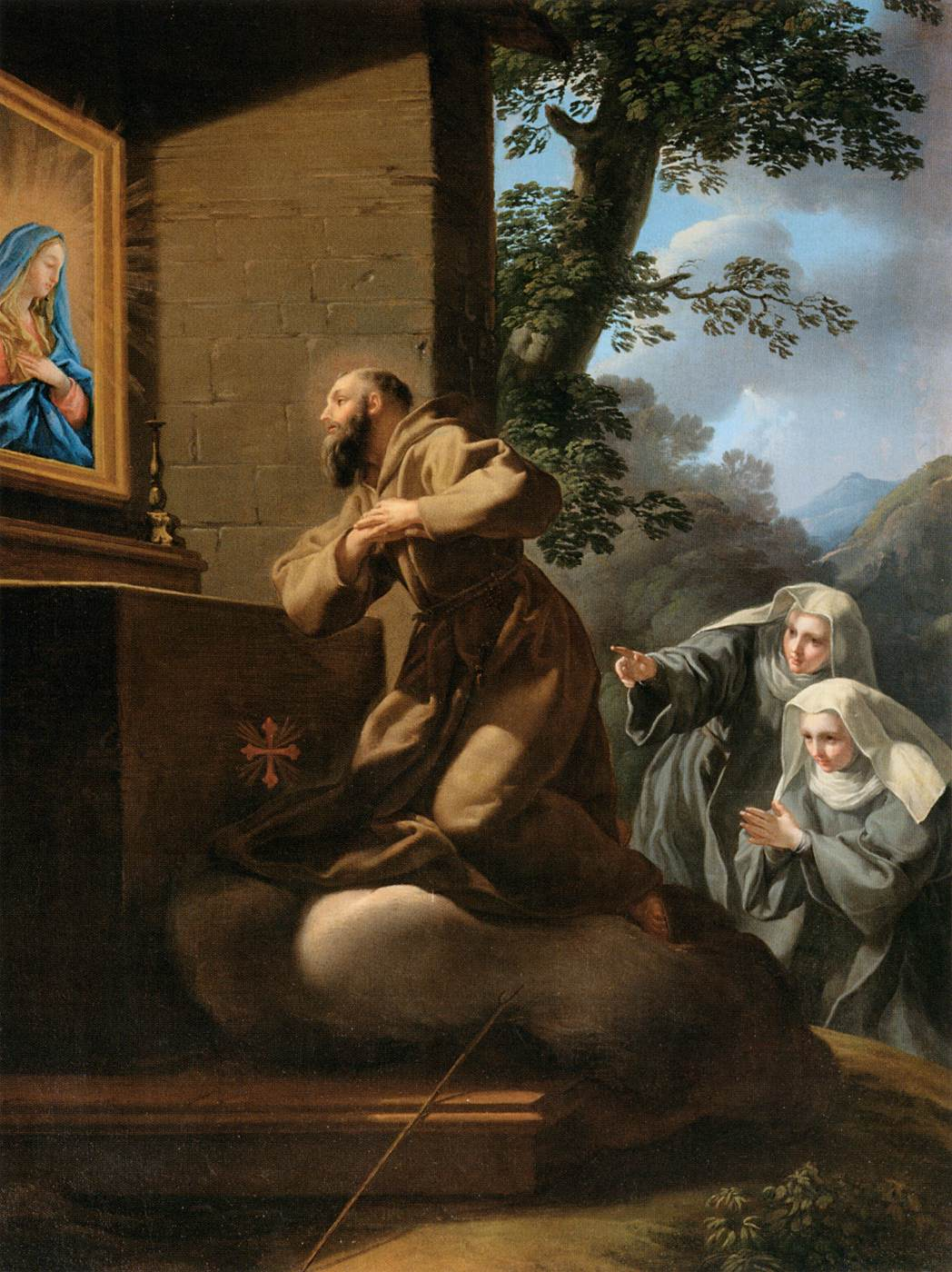
St. Francis of Paola in Ecstasy, c. 1728, oil on canvas, Louvre, Paris

Pietro Bianchi (September 1694 – 2 September 1740) was an Italian painter of the Baroque and early Rococo periods, active in Genoa and Rome. While his work is noted for its quality and beauty, his perfectionism and constant reworking of his paintings meant that his extant output is sparse.

== Biography ==
Pietro's father, Giovanni Bianchi, a cooper, had moved from Sarzana to Rome in 1682. when Pietro was orphaned at the age of two he was taken in by his older sister who was married to an attendant to the household of the Marchese Marcello Sacchetti, who noted the boy Pietro's affinity for drawing. As a boy he was placed as a apprentice to a painter Giacomo Triga, but then passed on to work in the school of the Genoese Giovanni Battista Gaulli called Il Baciccia. There he acquired his nickname "il Creatura di Baciccia" on account of his youth and small stature. In 1707, at age 13, he won a drawing competition sponsored by the Accademia di San Luca. In 1709, when Gaulli died, and he entered the studio of Giuseppe Ghezzi then under Benedetto Luti. He painted both religious stories and still life pictures of animals, flowers, and fruits.

Bianchi was offered a knighthood by Pope Clement XII but refused it, accepting instead a St.Peters Basilica. which resulted in the painting The Immaculate Conception Worshipped by Saints John Crysostom, St. Francis and St. Anthony of Padua, now in the church of Santa Maria degli Angeli at Rome, which was only barely finished at the time of his death and which was eventually executed in mosaic for St Peters. He painted a St. Clara now at Gubbio.

Bianchi died at 46 years of age. Gaetano Sardi was one of his pupils. Giovanni Frossi was another pupil.

== Bibliography ==
- Bryan, Michael (1886). Robert Edmund Graves (ed.). Dictionary of Painters and Engravers, Biographical and Critical. Vol. I: A-K. London: George Bell and Sons. p. 125.
- Soprani, Raffaello (1769). Carlo Giuseppe Ratti (ed.). Delle vite de' pittori, scultori, ed architetti genovesi; Tomo secundo. Genoa: Stamperia Casamara. pp. 292.

== See also ==
- Sebastiano Conca
- Agostino Masucci
- Jacopo Zoboli
- Pompeo Batoni
