= Giovanni Agostino Ratti =

Italian painter (1699–1755)

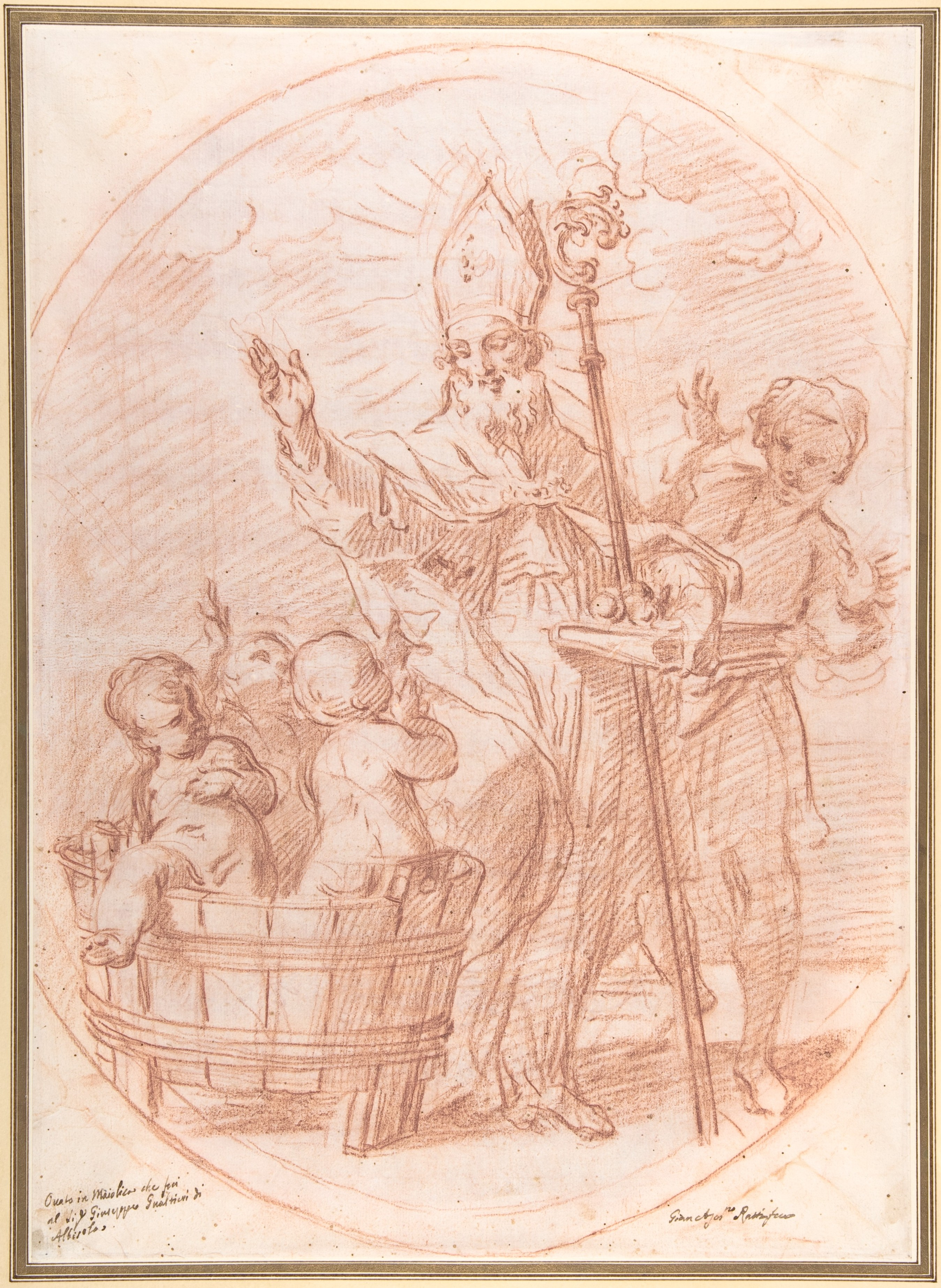
- Saint Nicholas of Bari Resuscitating Three Children Discovered in a Tub of Brine, Metropolitan Museum of Art, New York
- Born: 16 September 1699; Savona, Republic of Genoa
- Died: 11 November 1775 (aged 76); Genoa, Republic of Genoa
- Education: Benedetto Luti
- Known for: Painting
- Movement: Baroque
- Spouse: Maria Rosalia Filipponi (m. 1729)
- Children: Carlo Giuseppe Ratti

Giovanni Agostino Ratti (16 September 1699 – 11 November 1775) was an Italian painter of the late-Baroque period.

== Biography ==
Born in Savona, and active in Genoa, he constructed scenography for the theatre, and cabinets with lively caricatures, which he also engraved. He was clever in church paintings, as may be seen in the church of San Giovanni at Savona, where, besides other subjects of St John the Baptist, there is a much-praised Decollation. He also painted in the church of Santa Teresa in Genoa, and was a follower of Benedetto Luti, whose school he had frequented when in Rome. He was also a good fresco-painter; his works are in the choir of the Conventual church in Casale Monferrato, where he added figures to the quadratura of Giuseppe Natali. But subjects of humor were his forte. In these, he had an exhaustless fancy, fertile and ever-creative. Nothing can be more amusing than his masks, representing quarrels, dances, and such scenes as form the subjects of comedy. Giovanni's son, Carlo Giuseppe Ratti, was an artist and art biographer.

== Bibliography ==
- Lanzi, Luigi (1847). History of Painting in Italy; From the Period of the Revival of the Fine Arts to the End of the Eighteenth Century. Vol. III. Translated by Thomas Roscoe. London: Henry G. Bohn. pp. 287–288.
- Grosso, Orlando (1935). "RATTI, Giovanni Agostino". Enciclopedia Italiana. Rome: Istituto dell'Enciclopedia Italiana.
