= Raffaele Soprani =

Italian nobleman, scholar and art historian

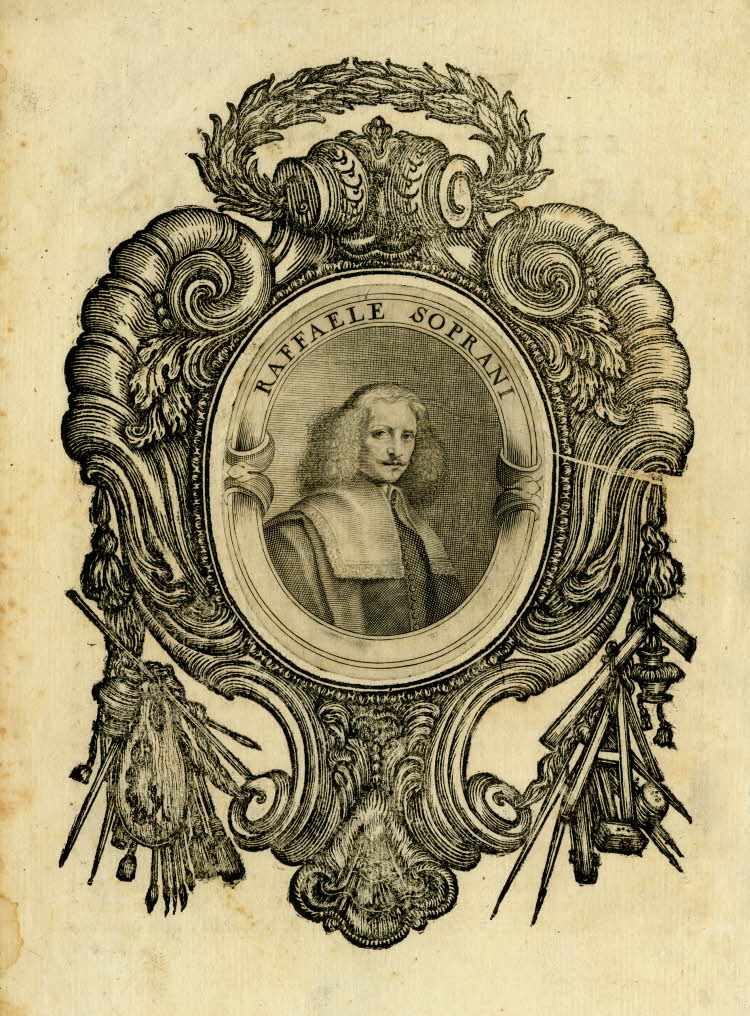
- Portrait of Raffaele Soprani
- Born: January 8, 1612; Genoa, Republic of Genoa
- Died: 2 January 1672 (aged 59); Genoa, Republic of Genoa
- Resting place: Church of San Francesco di Castelletto
- Occupations: Politician, writer, and painter
- Known for: Vite de' Pittori, scultori ed Architetti Genovesi (1674)
- Parent(s): Antonio Maria Soprani and Geronima Oliva

Raffaele Soprani (8 January 1612 – 2 January 1672) was an Italian nobleman and scholar, mainly known for his volume of biographies of Genoese artists and foreign artists working in Genoa, which remains an important source for historians of Genoese art.

== Biography ==
Soprani belonged to a prominent aristocratic family and served twice as a senator of the Republic of Genoa. He received a broad Humanist education that included painting and drawing. He was taught perspective and landscape painting in the workshop of Giulio Benso and was later influenced by the German landscape painter Gottfried Wals. He founded a painting workshop and had a close artistic association with Pellegrino Piola, although he was fundamentally an amateur. In 1640 he married the daughter of the Doge Leonardo Della Torre.

His friendship with Benso, and the popularity of Vasari's biographies, led Soprani to collect informations about Ligurian painters, sculptors, and architects. His first synthesis was complete by about 1657, but he continued to revise the manuscript. The manuscript was interrupted in 1665 for two years while the Florentine publisher Giovanni Battista Brocchi was considering publishing it. In the event it was not published until 1674, two years after the author’s death, enlarged and revised by Giovanni Nicolò Cavanna and illustrated with engravings by Domenico Piola. The book was later revised and republished in two volumes (1768–9) by Carlo Giuseppe Ratti, who added lives of contemporary artists, up to the mid-18th century. Soprani also published books on the writers of Liguria and select biographies.

== Works ==
- Delle vite de' Pittori, scultori ed Architetti Genovesi. Vol. 1. Genoa: nella stamperia Casamara. 1768.
- Li Scrittori della Liguria, e particolarmente della maritima. Genoa: P. G. Calenzani. 1667.
- Vita della Venerabile Suor Tomasa Fiesca. Genoa: Benedetto Celle. 1667.

== Bibliography ==
- Sanguineti, Daniele (2019). "SOPRANI, Raffaele". Dizionario Biografico degli Italiani (in Italian). Vol. 93: Sisto V–Stammati. Rome: Istituto dell'Enciclopedia Italiana. ISBN 978-88-12-00032-6.
- Ostrowski, Jan K. (1992). "Studi su Raffaele Soprani". Artibus et Historiae. 13 (26): 177–189. doi:10.2307/1483438. JSTOR 1483438.
- Theodoli, Olimpia (2003). "Soprani, Raffaele". Grove Art Online. doi:10.1093/gao/9781884446054.article.T079787. ISBN 978-1-884446-05-4.
