= Gottfried Wals =

German painter

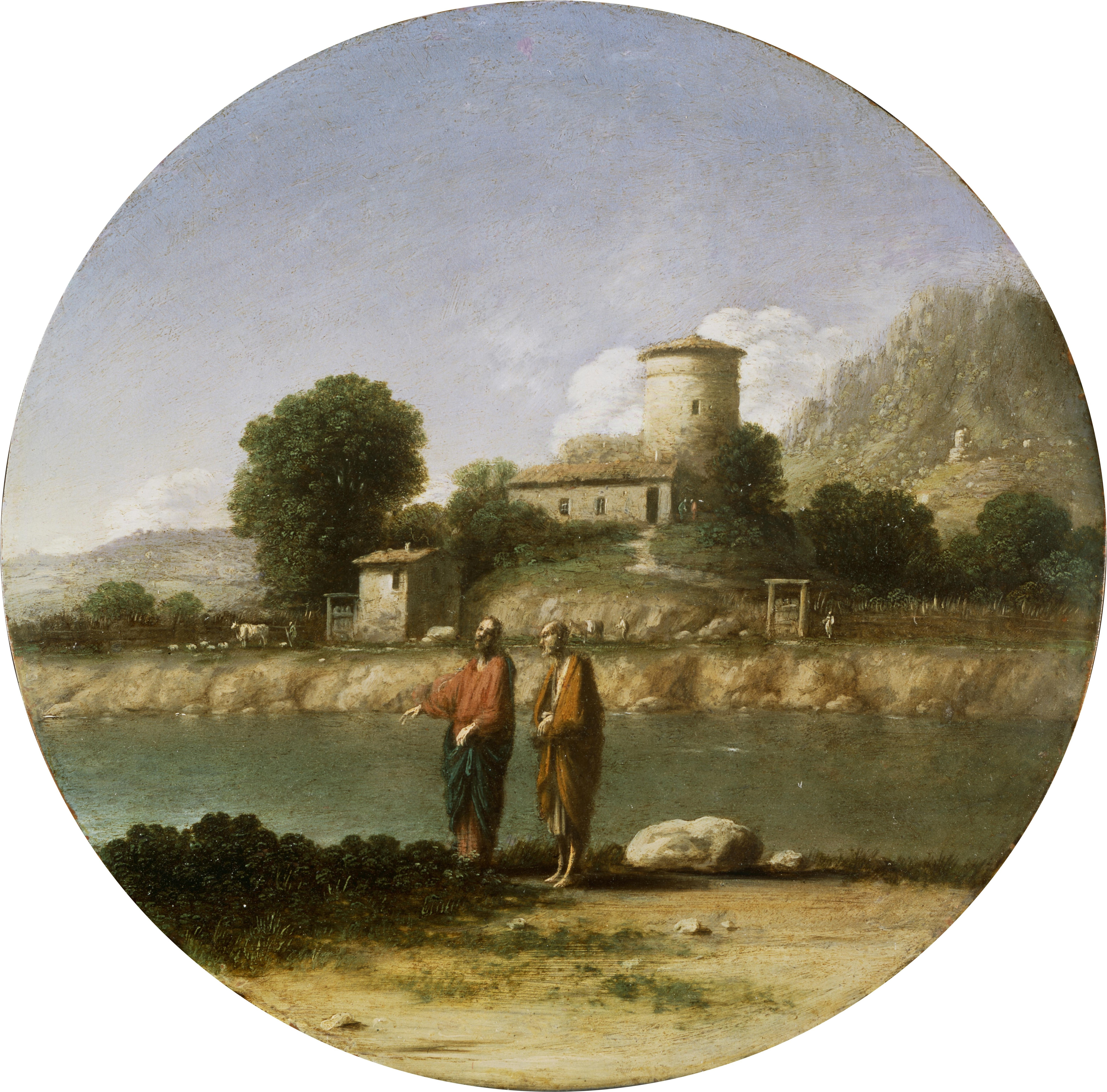
Landscape with Jesus and John the Baptist

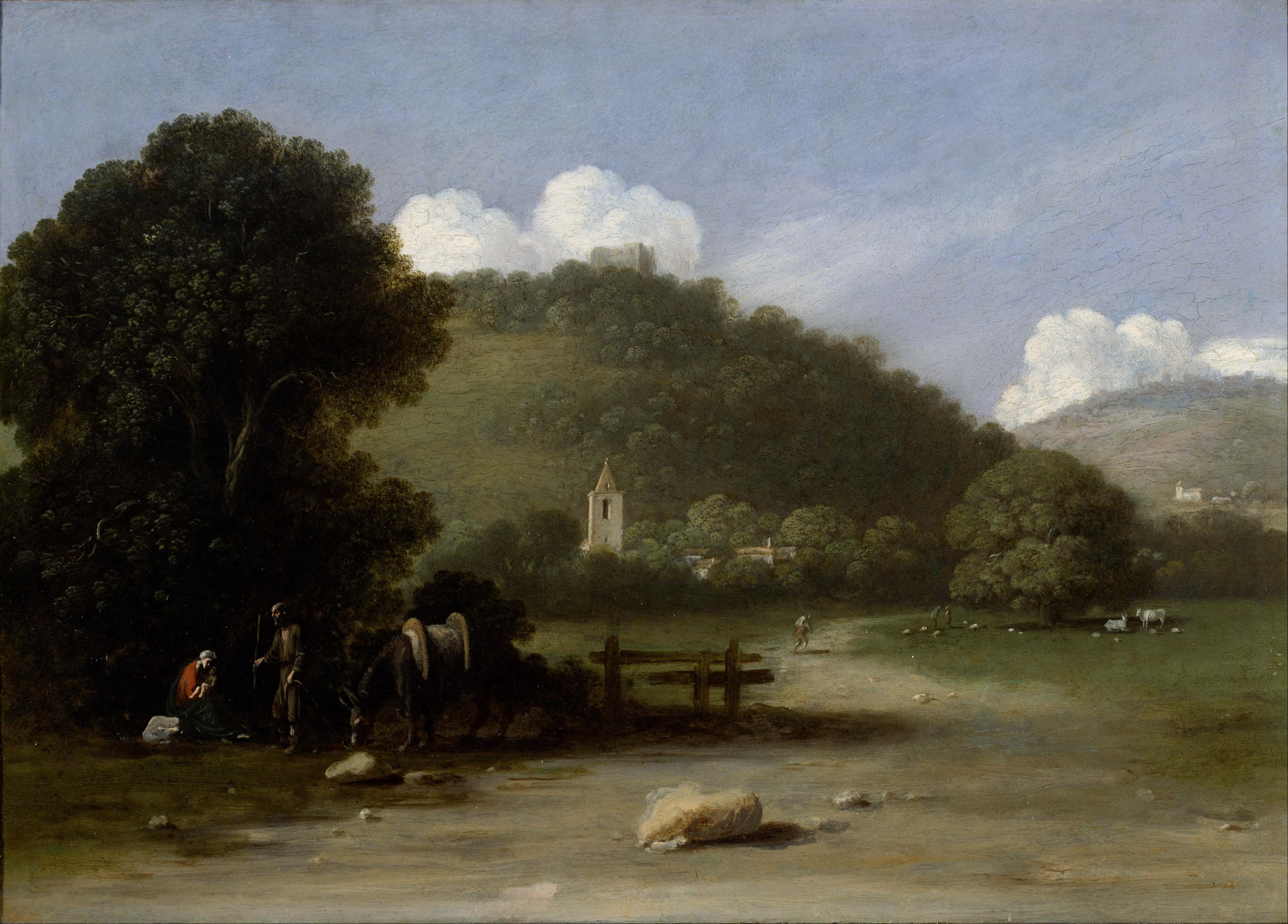
Landscape with the Flight into Egypt

Gottfried Wals, or Goffredo Wals (c. 1595 – 1638) was a German painter who spent most of his career in Italy. He was sometimes referred to as Goffredo Tedesco (Goffredo the German).

== Biography ==
Little is known about his early life, except that he was born in Cologne. He wandered about through numerous Italian cities, including Naples and Genoa; arriving in Rome around 1615. There, he became an assistant to Agostino Tassi, a harsh master who attacked him with blows from a club and was briefly imprisoned in 1616, when Wals filed a complaint.

The following year, he lived with the newly arrived Massimo Stanzione, in the Roman quarter of Trastevere. From 1620 to 1622, Claude Lorrain was an occasional student of his. In 1623, he was back in Genoa with Antonio Travi as his student.

Most of his works were in small format, often circular and painted on copper. His interest in composition and lighting is very marked and often bears resemblance to the works of Filippo Napoletano, who was in turn a follower of Adam Elsheimer.

Few works of his have come down to us. His Catalogue raisonné contains only twenty-five works that have been definitely identified as painted by him. In comparison, it is known that, in 1634, the Belgian-born merchant, Gaspard De Roomer (c.1600–1674) of Naples, owned sixty of his landscapes and fourteen drawings.

He most probably died in Calabria, during or shortly after the earthquake of 27 March 1638, which killed almost 10,000 people.
