= Filippo Napoletano =

Italian painter (died 1629)

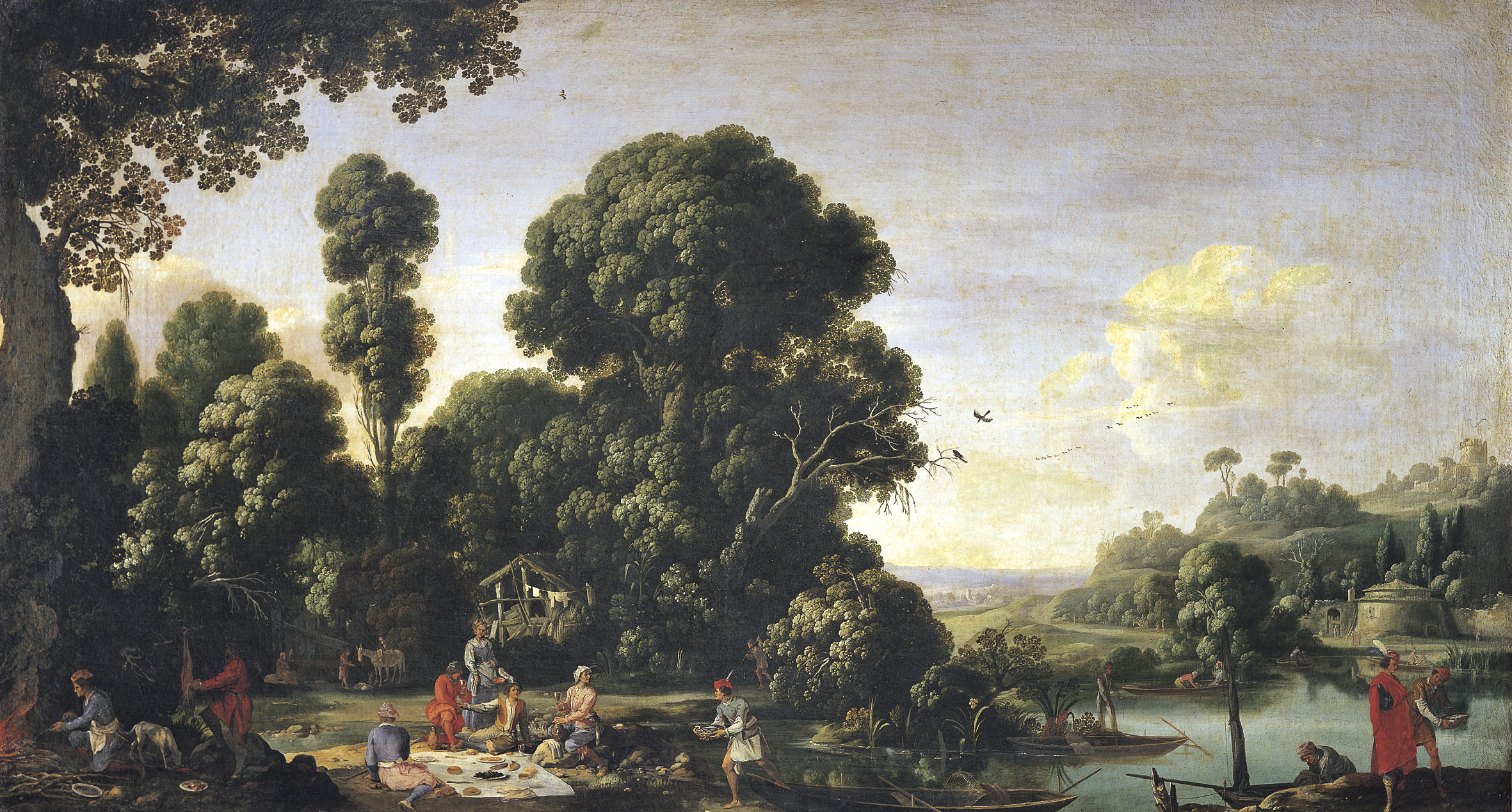
Picnic on the Grass, 1619

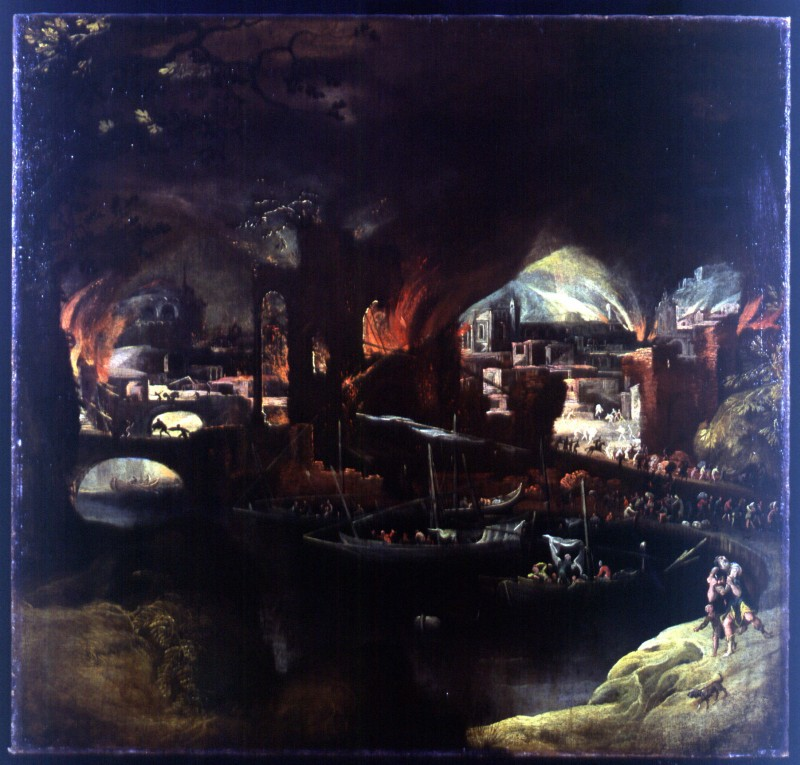
Burning of Troy (Fondazione Cariplo)

Filippo Napoletano, whose real name was Filippo Teodoro di Liagno or Teodoro Filippo de Liagno (c. 1587–1589 – November 1629) was an Italian artist, with a varied output, mainly landscape and genre scenes and also drawings or etchings of diverse, often particular, items such as exotic soldiers, skeletons of animals, or cityscapes.

== Biography ==
Born in Rome, he moved as a child with his family to Naples, where he began his career (1600–1613). He moved to Rome around 1614. He was influenced by successful Flemish landscape painters in Italy such as Paul Bril, Gottfried Wals, and Adam Elsheimer. He became one of the artistic protégés of Cardinal Del Monte.

In 1617 Cosimo II de’ Medici summoned him to Florence, where he worked closely with Jacques Callot. He held the post of court painter to the Medici family and was highly esteemed for his original works with their wealth of dramatic, nocturnal scenes. From notebooks, Filippo is known to have made hundreds of sketches of Tuscan landscapes and towns. After his return to Rome in 1621, he combined easel painting with fresco decorations featuring views of the countryside in the region of Lazio with ancient Roman ruins. Napoletano's eclectic output recalls the nature focus of the Tuscan contemporary Jacopo Ligozzi.

Starting in 1620 he reproduced in etchings part of his collection of animal skeletons owned by Johann Faber, a Bavarian physician-naturalist residing in Rome and a member of the scientific Accademia dei Lincei. In 1622, Napoletano published twelve etchings of caprices (capricci) and military uniforms (which he signed as signed Teodor Filippo de Liagno).

He is described by Giovanni Baglione as possessing a collection, a wunderkammer of bellissime bizzarrie ("beautiful bizarre objects"), including among the objects exotic weaponry; fossilized plants; tiger, lion, and turtle skulls; oriental porcelain and sculpted crockery; a vest made of human skin; a harness for dragging whales on ice; a three-legged flea, Persian uniforms, and antiquities such as Roman coins, bronze lamps, and a few statuettes. After Napoletano's death at Rome in 1628, bidding for such material was made by collectors such as Cardinal Ippolito Aldobrandini (future Clement VIII) and Cassiano dal Pozzo.

== Works ==
- Navires amarrés dans une rade, au pied d'une forteresse rocheuse, pencil, brown ink, brown lavish, black stone, 15.6 by 40.6 cm (6.1 by 16.0 in), Paris, Beaux-Arts de Paris.
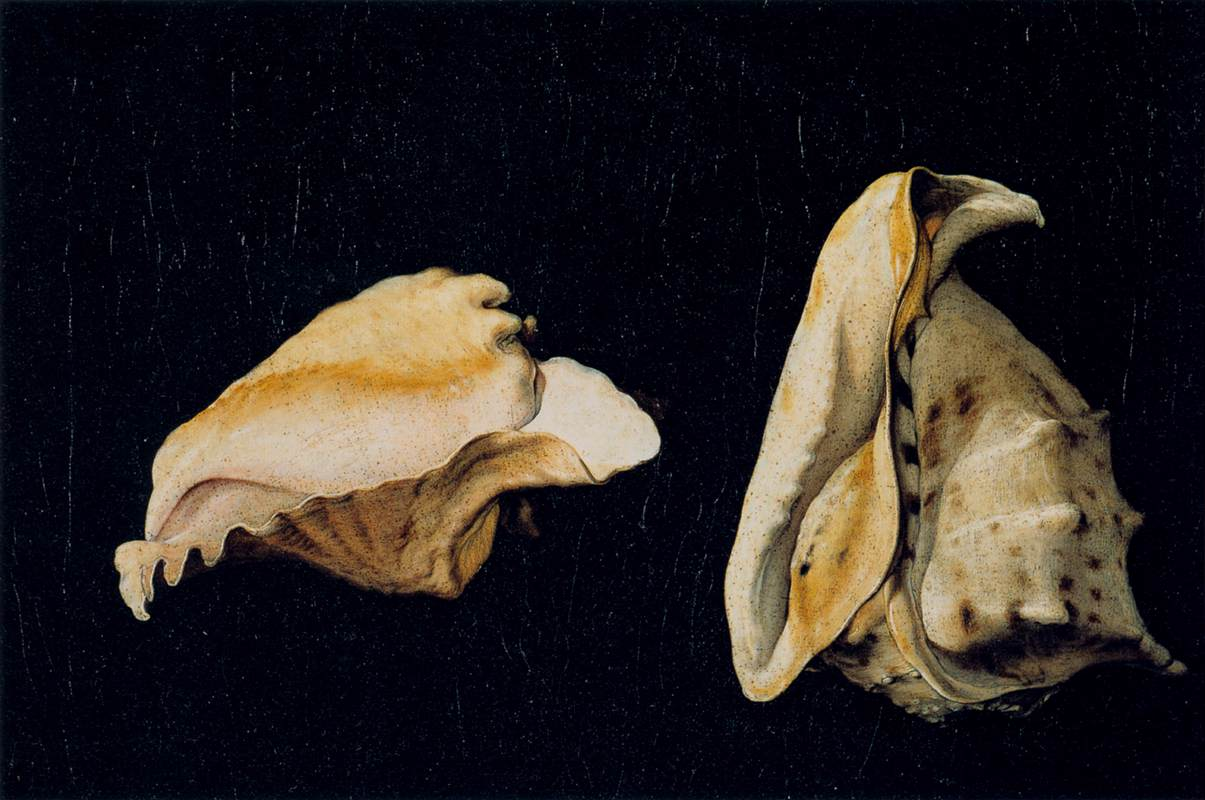
Two Shells, Pitti Palace

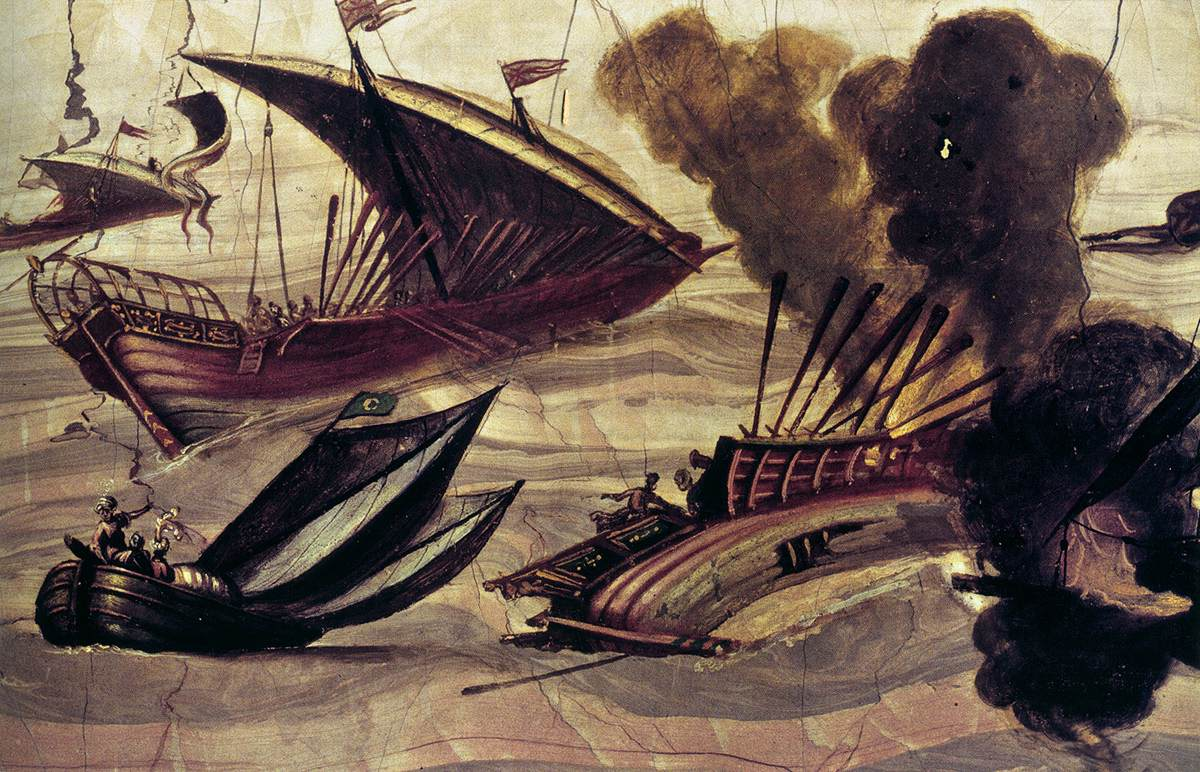
Naval battle, Opificio delle Pietre Dure Museum, Florence

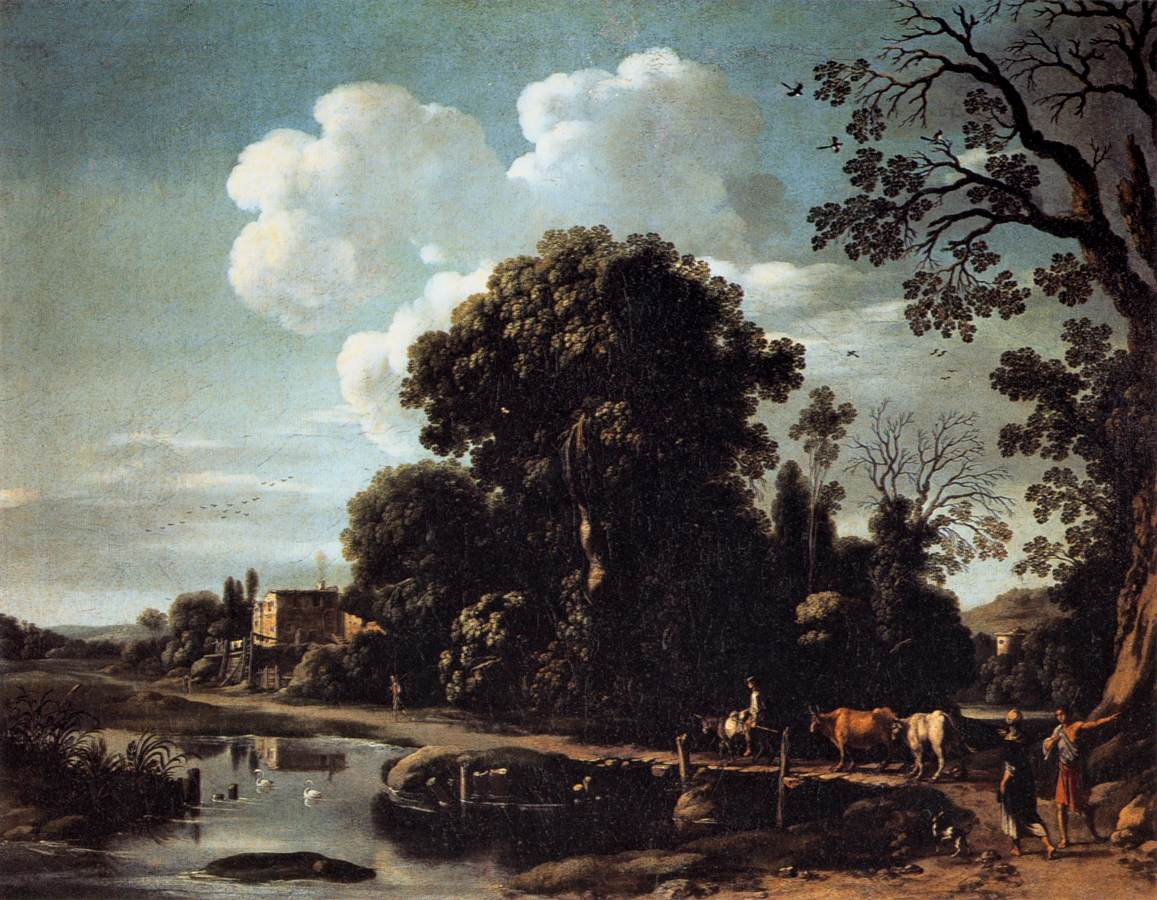
River Landscape, Pitti Palace

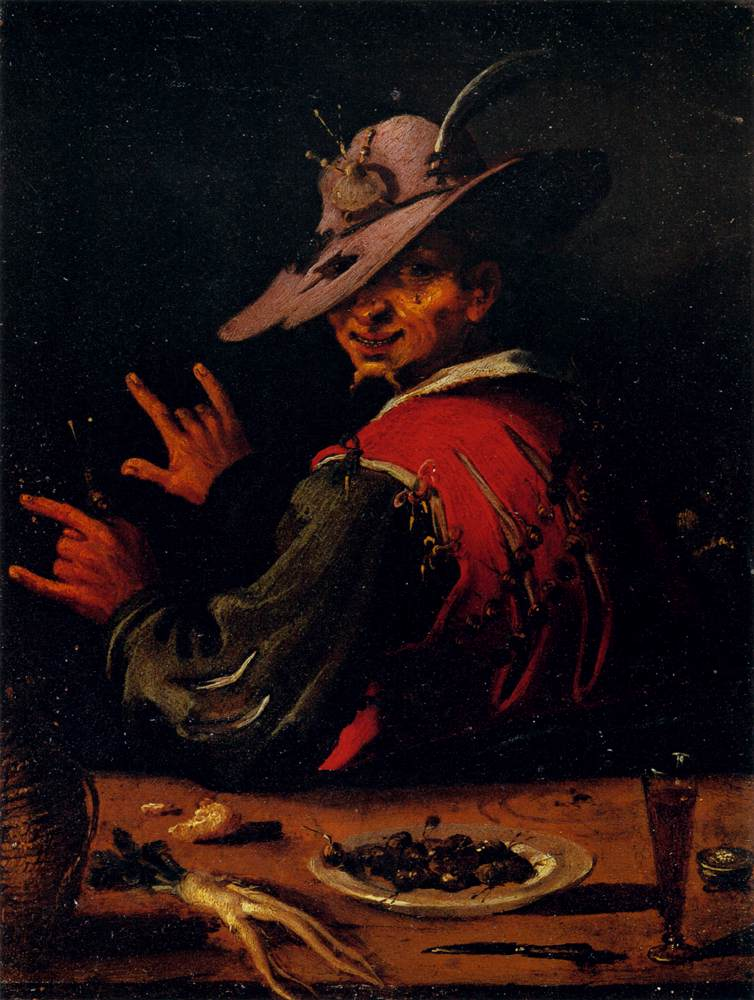
Seller of Snails, Pitti Palace

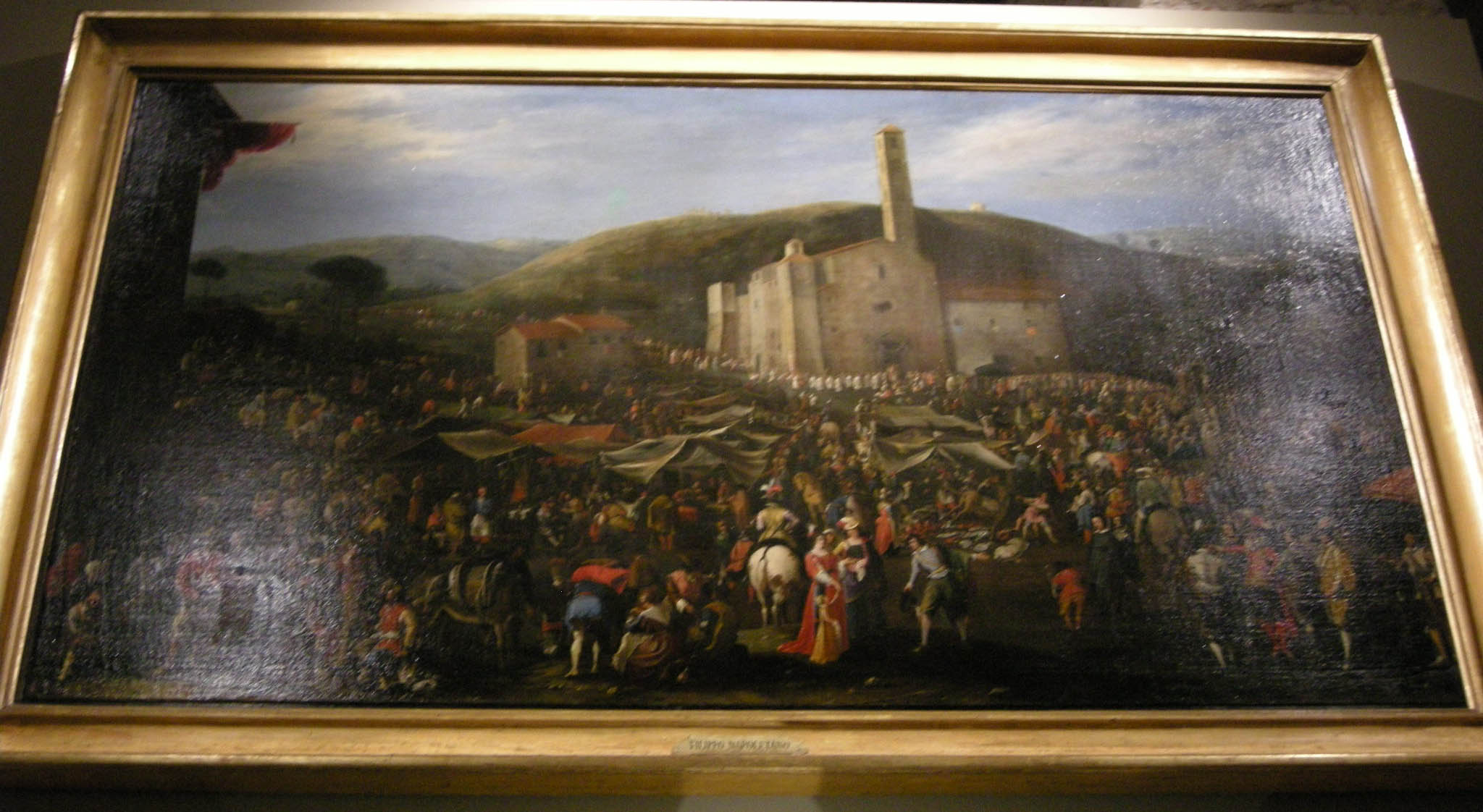
Fiera (Festival) of Impruneta (1618), Pitti Palace

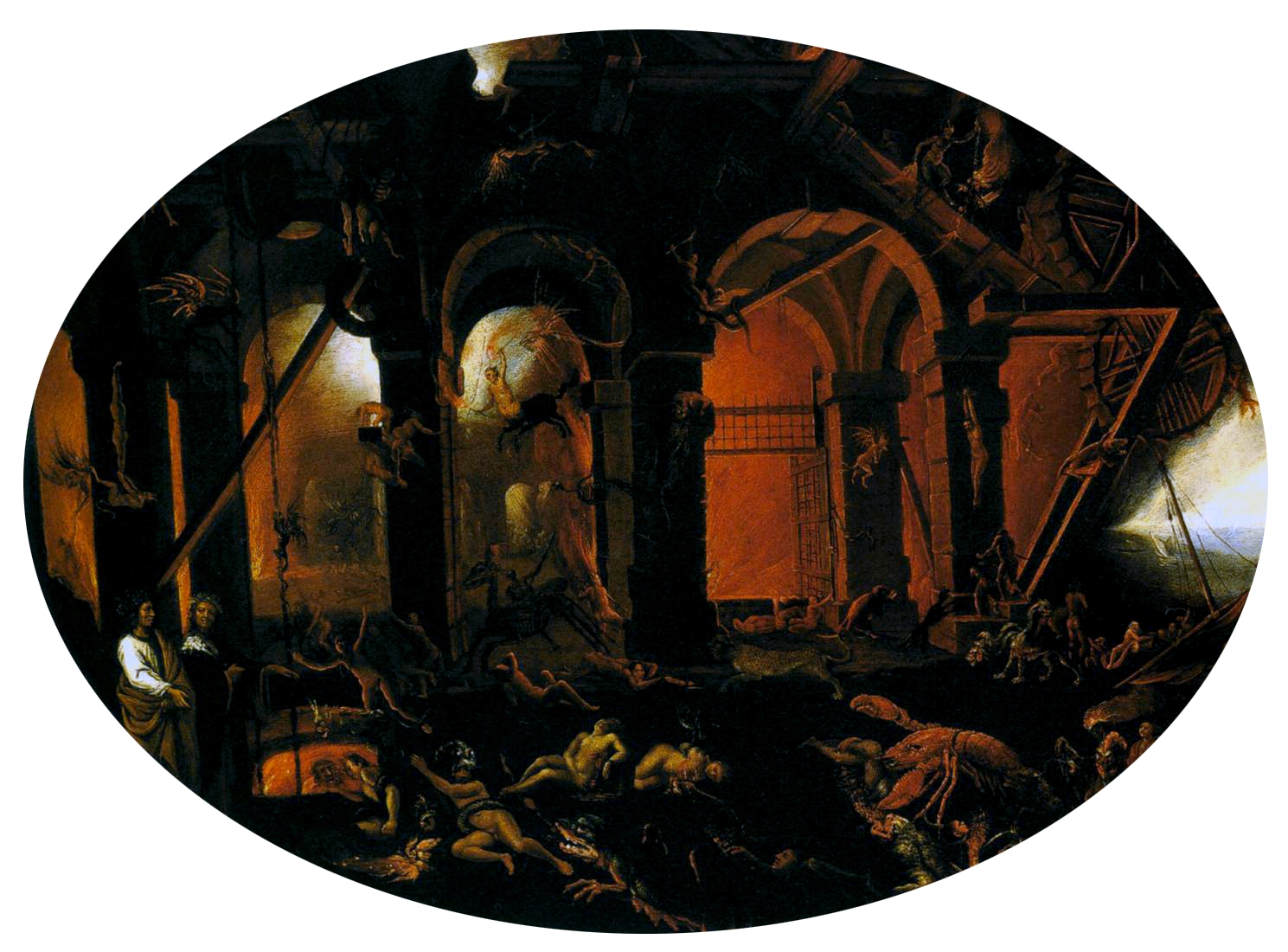
Dante and Virgil in the Underworld (c. 1622)
