= Benedetto Luti =

Italian painter (1666–1724)

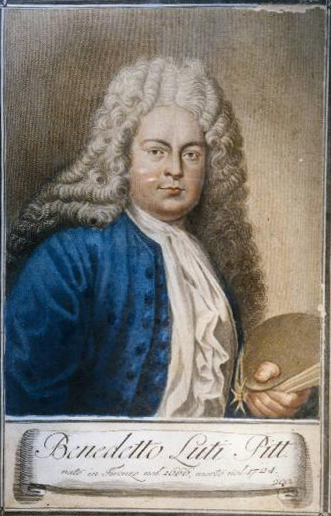
- Self-Portrait
- Born: 17 November 1666; Florence, Grand Dutch of Tuscany
- Died: 17 June 1724 (aged 57)
- Known for: Painting
- Movement: Baroque

Benedetto Luti (17 November 1666 – 17 June 1724) was an Italian Baroque painter, draftsman, and pastelist.

== Early life ==
Luti was born in Florence on 17 November 1666. He trained under Anton Domenico Gabbiani before moving to Rome in 1690.

== Career ==
In Rome he gained the patronage of Cosimo III de' Medici, Grand Duke of Tuscany, an enthusiast of Luti's pastel portraiture. Luti was one of the first artists to work in pastels as the final composition as opposed to initial studies for paintings or frescoes.

Luti was employed by many of the leading Roman families of the day, including the Colonna, Pallavicini, Barberini, and Odescalchi. He also worked in oils and painted frescoes, including for the Basilica di San Giovanni in Laterano. He became a member of the Accademia di San Luca in 1694.

Luti was also a successful art dealer and ran a school of drawing; among his pupils were Giovanni Domenico Piastrini, Giovanni Paolo Panini, Claude Arnulphy, Jean-Baptiste van Loo, William Kent, Charles-André van Loo, Giovanni Agostino Ratti, Pietro Bianchi, Placido Costanzi, and Vieira Lusitano.

=== Knighthood ===
In 1720, he was knighted in the Academy of St Luke of Rome and elected Principe. The appointment was not without controversy, since some:

"could not find anything (of Luti's) worthy of memory for the benefit of the arts. Pascoli's of account Luti, found him a deep intellect, and even more knowledgeable of the works that he draws, although ... because he knew too much and was never satisfied, he oftentimes recycled thoughts and figures: he did not make friends with anyone, and for this reason, when was elected Prince of the Academy, there was not much applause."

The next year he dedicated himself to painting frescoes the cupola of the Church of Santi Luca e Martina in Rome.

== Gallery ==
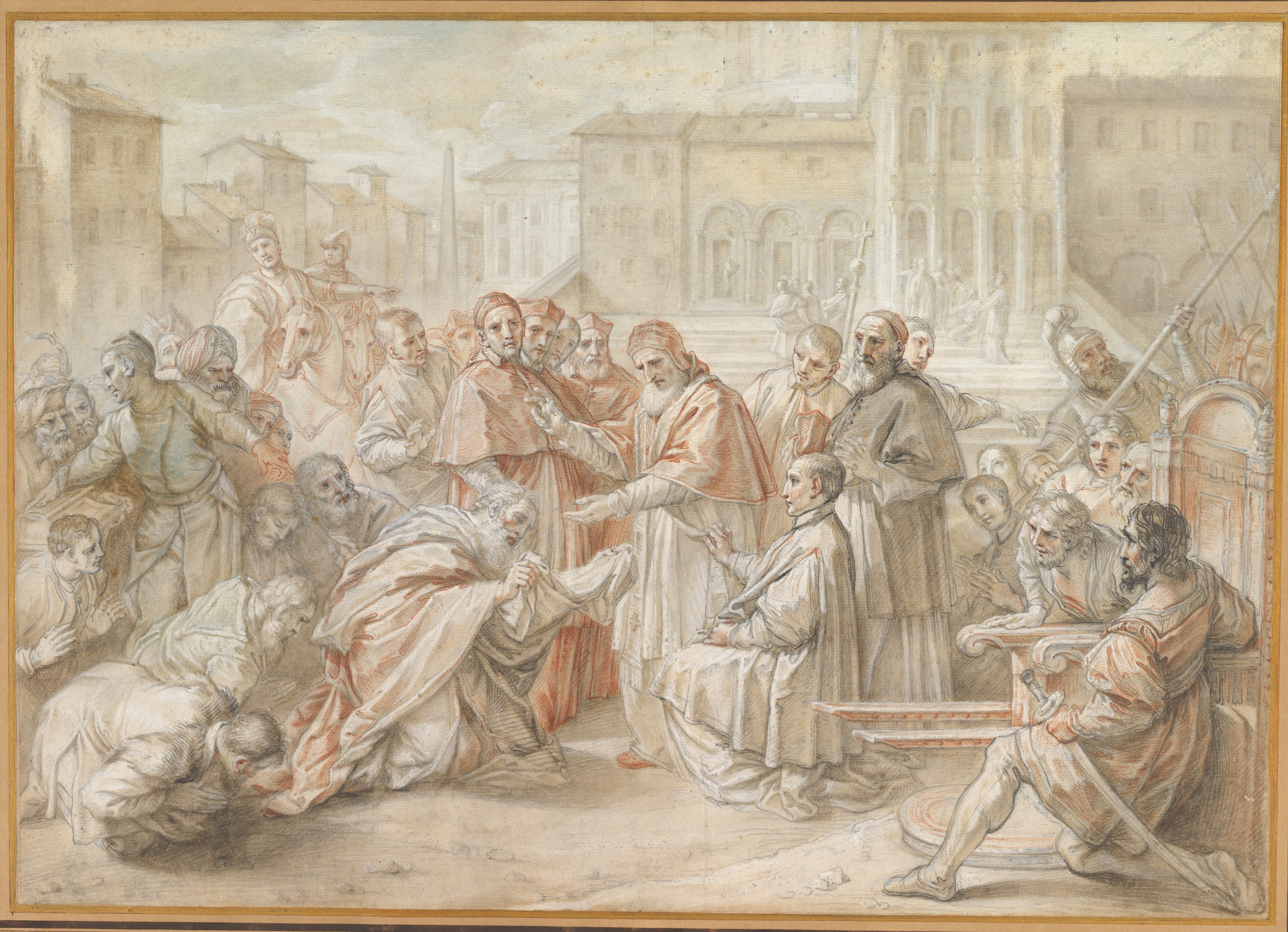
Pius V and the Ambassador of the King of Poland at the Metropolitan Museum of Art, 1712

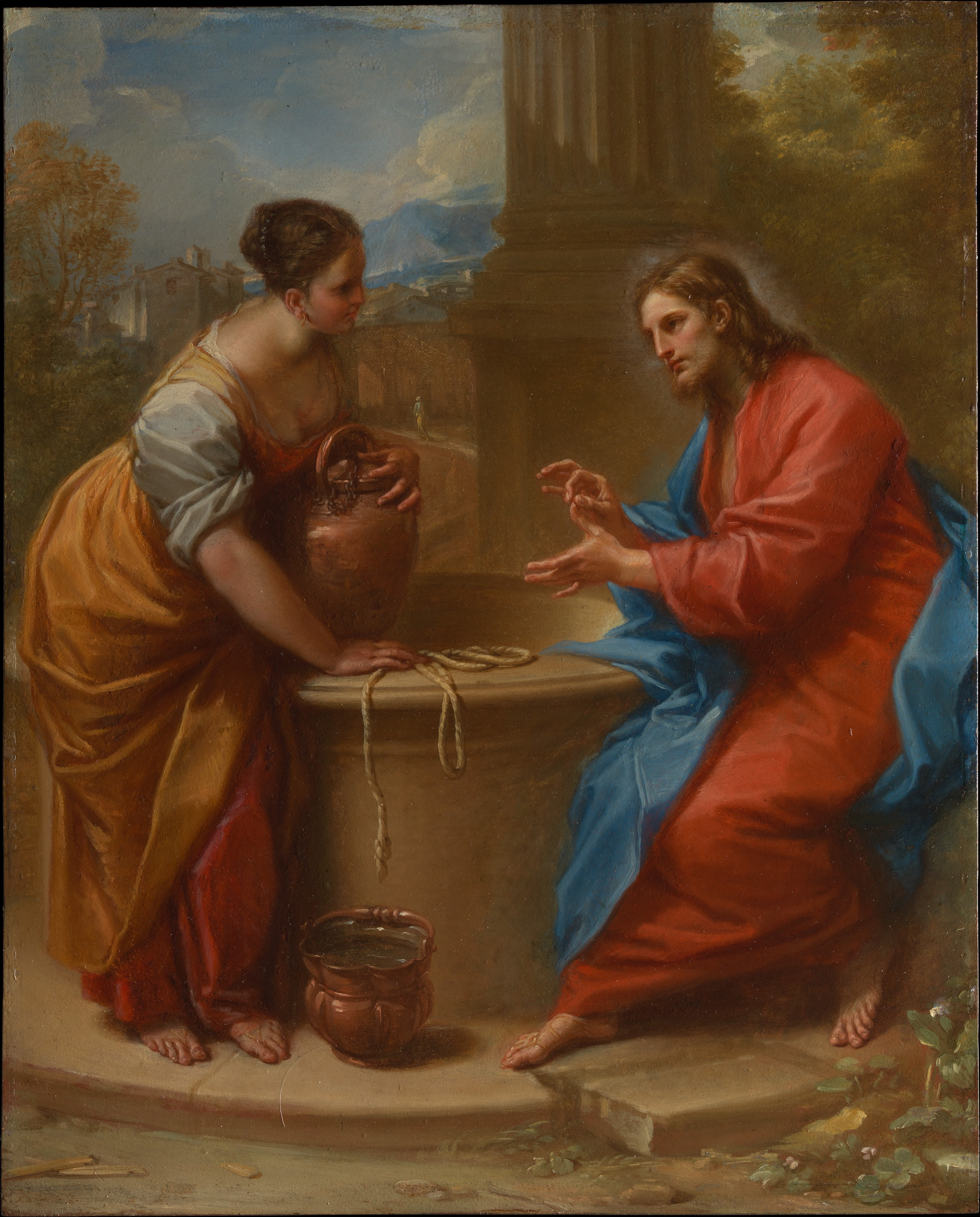
Christ and the Woman of Samaria at the Metropolitan Museum of Art, 1715–20

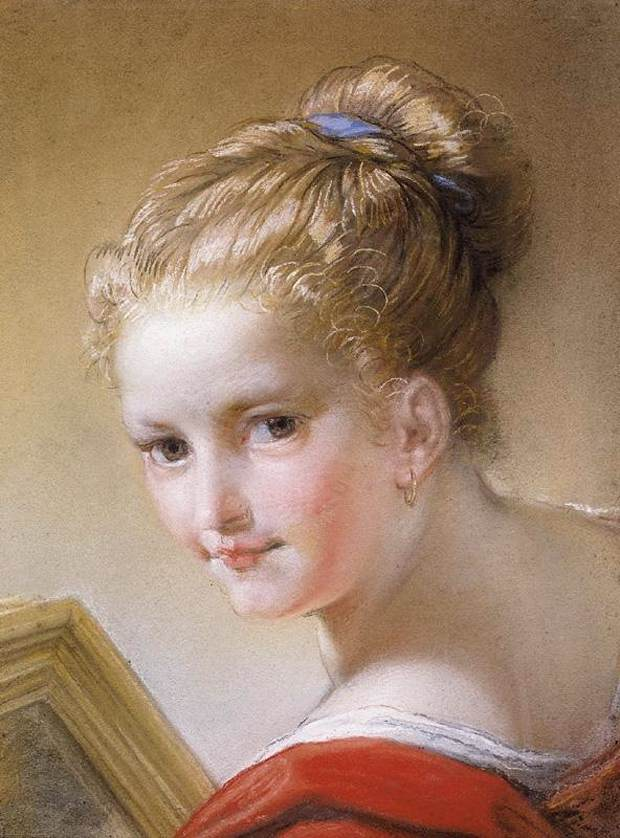
Young Girl (1717), pastel on paper

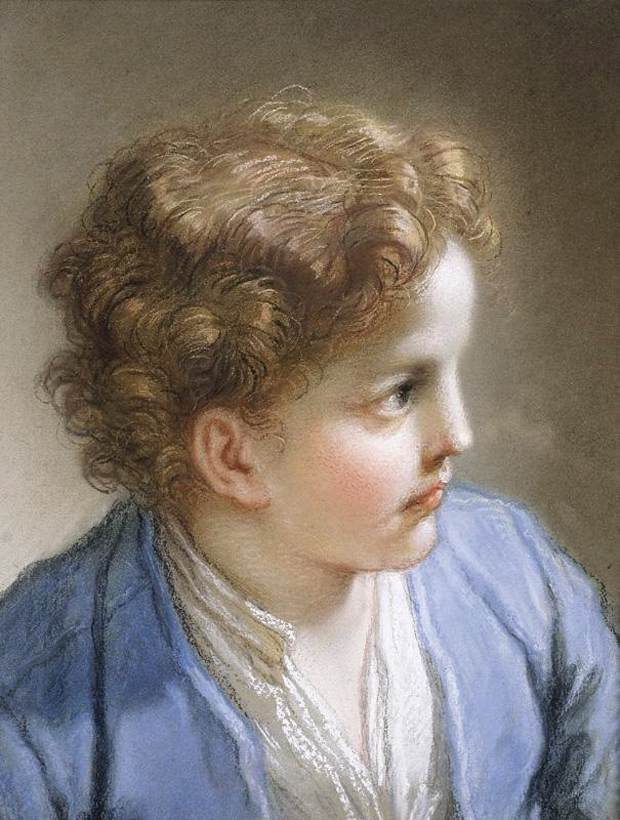
Young Boy (1717), pastel on paper

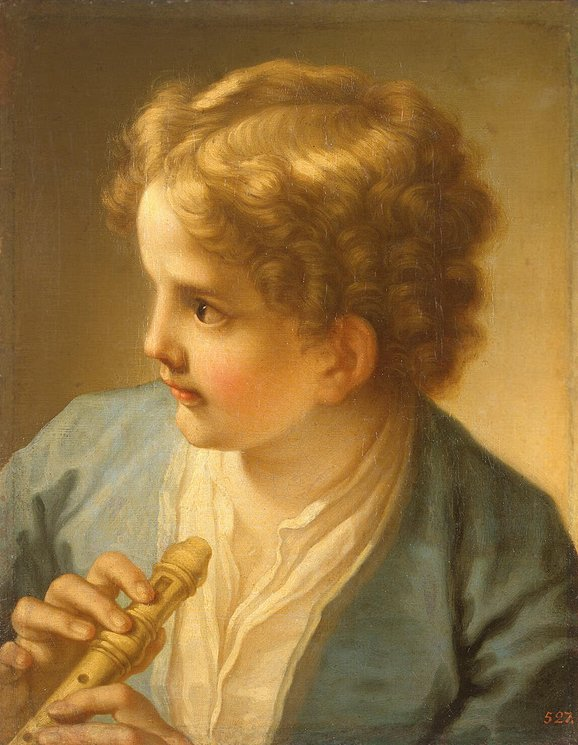
Boy with the flute (c. 1720), oil on canvas

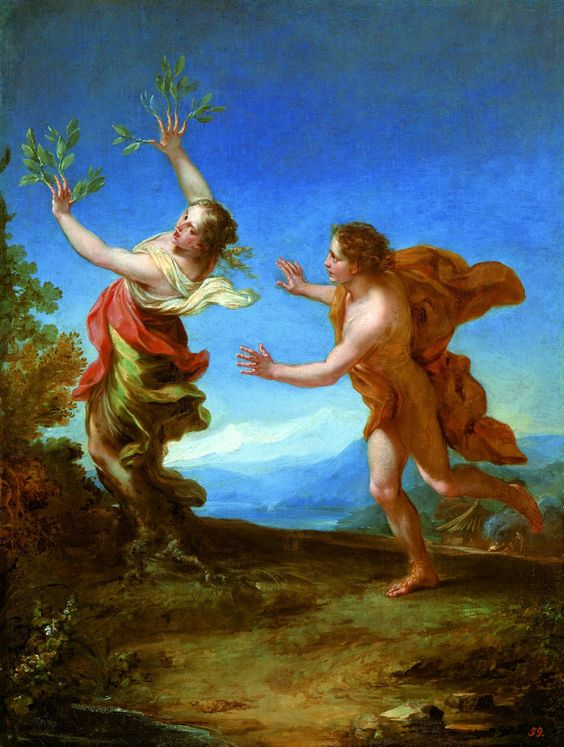
Apollo and Daphne, oil on canvas

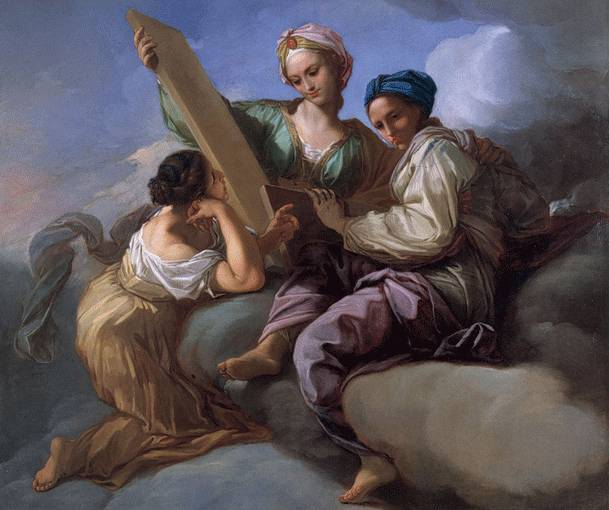
Allegory of Wisdom

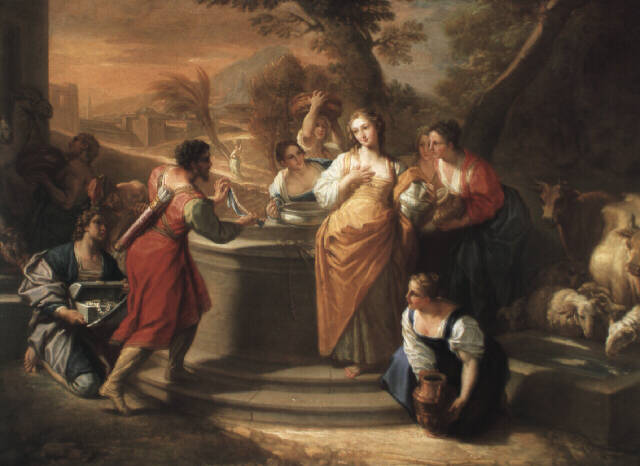
Rebecca at Well

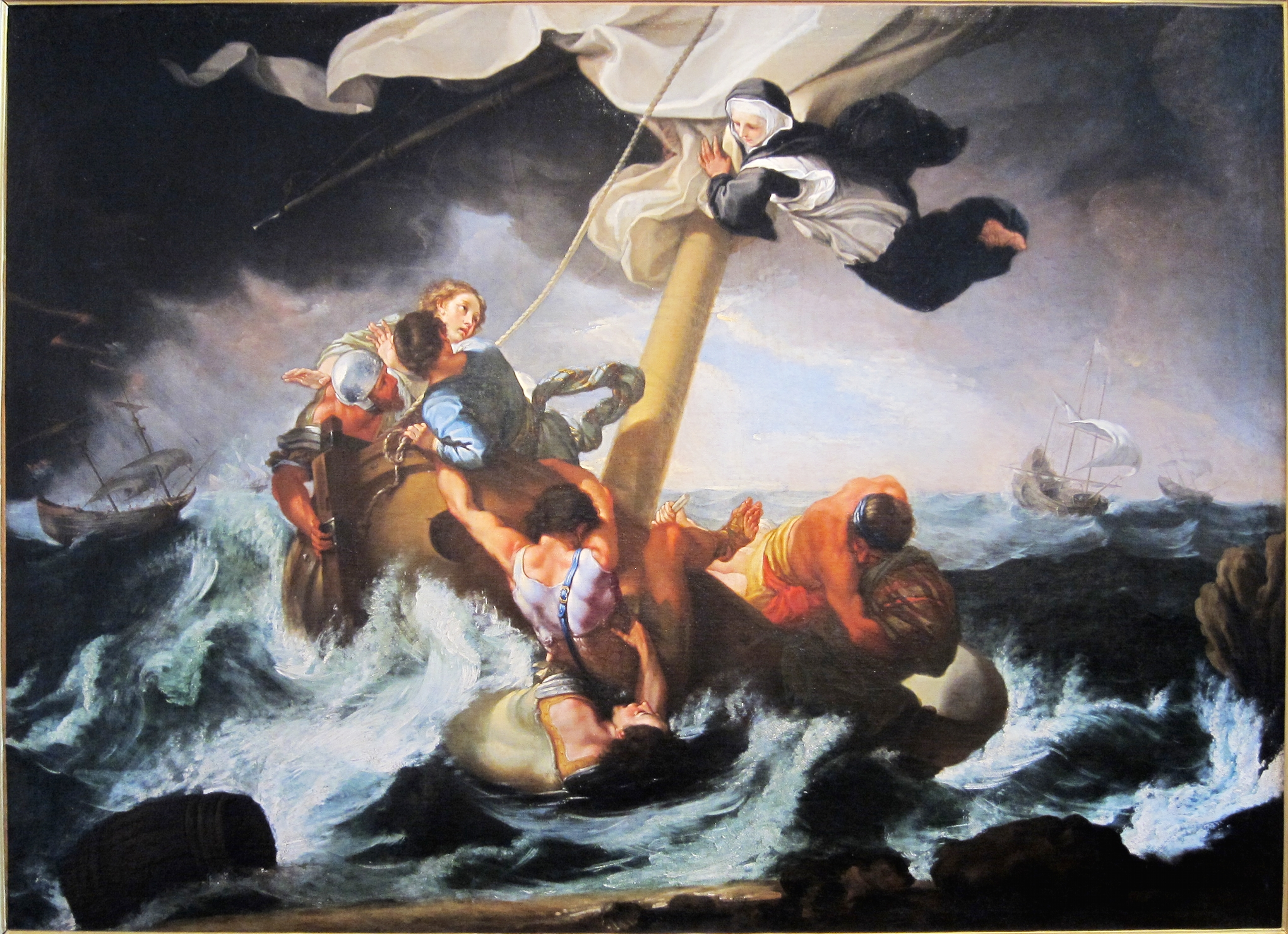
St Catherine, oil on canvas

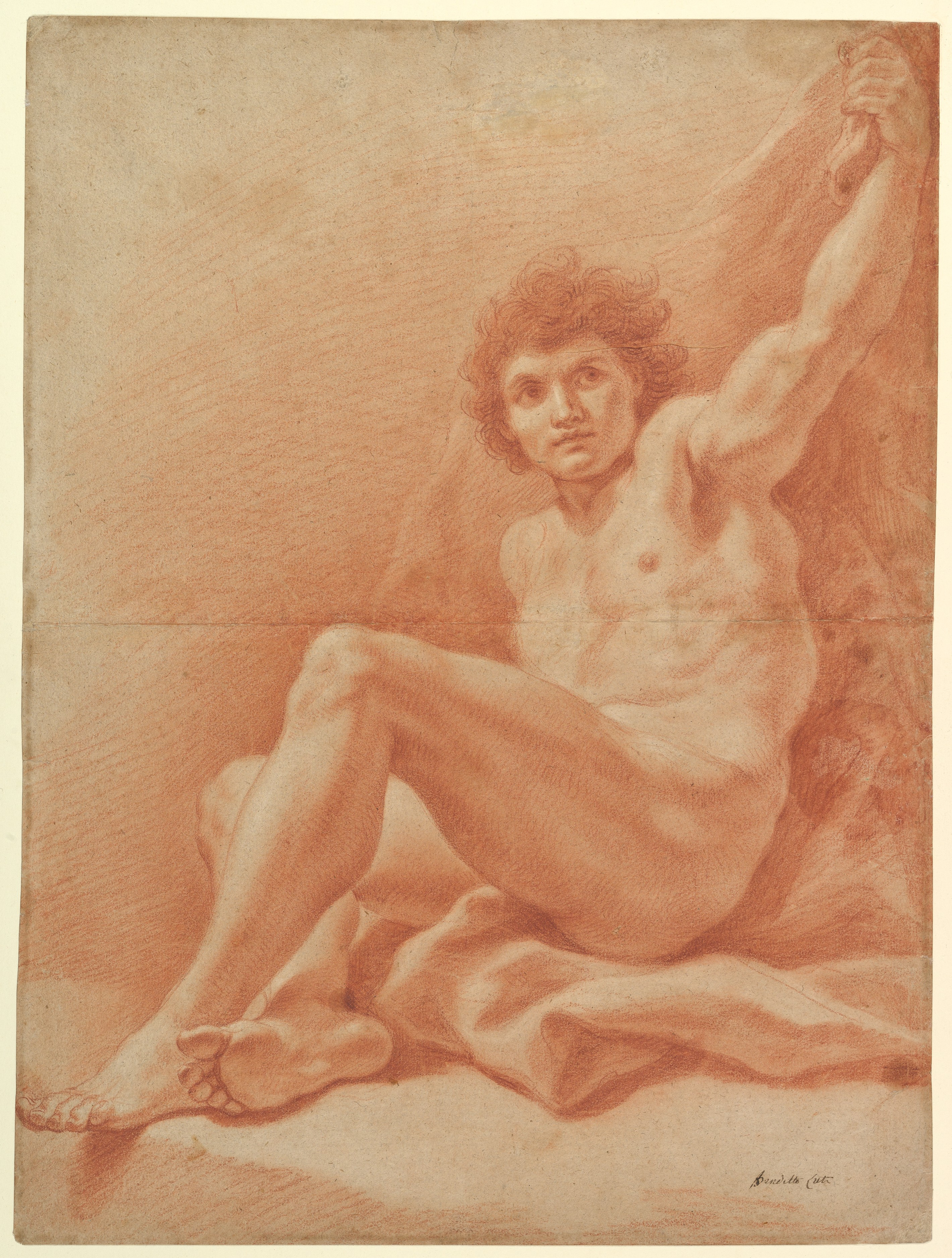
Seated Nude Male Figure (recto); Seated Figure (verso) at the Metropolitan Museum of Art

== Sources ==
- Peters Brown, E. (2000). "Benedetto Luti". Art in Rome in the Eighteenth Century. Philadelphia/London. pp. 392–399.
- R. Maffeis, Benedetto Luti: l'ultimo maestro, Firenze, Mandragora, 2012.
- S. Sperindei, Nuovi spunti di ricerca su Benedetto Luti, in "Annali della Pontificia Insigne Accademia di Belle Arti e Lettere dei Virtuosi al Pantheon", 14 (2014), pp. 601–612.
- G. Sestieri, Risarcimenti a Benedetto Luti, in Studi di storia dell’arte in onore di Fabrizio Lemme, a cura di F. Baldassari, A. Agresti, Roma 2017, pp. 265–276.
