= Placido Costanzi =

Italian painter (1702–1759)

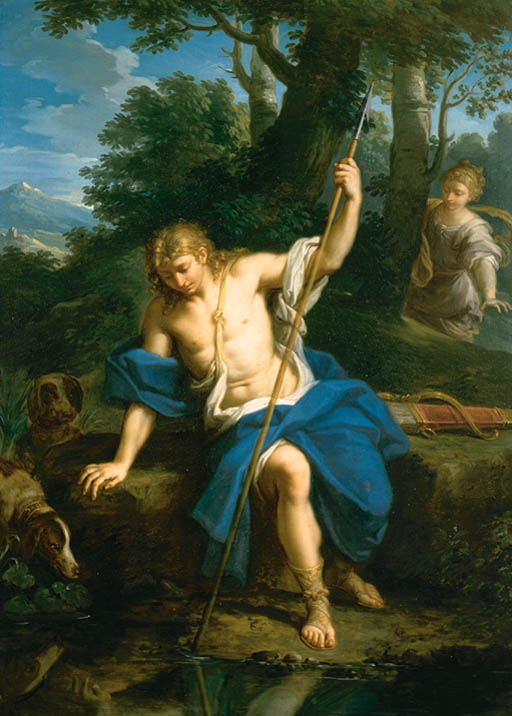
Placido Costanzi, Narcissus and Echo.

Placido Costanzi (1702 – 2 October 1759) was an Italian painter of the late-Baroque period. Many of his works decorate Rome's churches. He was a member of the prestigious Accademia di San Luca, in which he served also as director (Principe) since 1758. One of his pupils was Pietro Antonio Gualdi Lodrini.

== Biography ==
=== Early life and education ===
Placido Costanzi was born in 1702 to a family of gem-makers in Rome. He was exposed to art at a very young age, and became a pupil of Benedetto Luti and painted mainly historical and devotional subjects. From Luti he acquired the basic stylistic components of his artistic language with elements derived from Sebastiano Conca and the decorative works of Sebastiano Ricci, Giovanni Odazzi and Giovanni Battista Gaulli. At the same time he inclined towards a moderate form of classicism, which led him to study the works of Raphael, Annibale Carracci and Domenichino.

=== Career ===
Costanzi had early success, with commissions from both Italian and foreign clients. He painted the decorations for the villa of Cardinal Giulio Alberoni (1664–1752) outside Porta Pia, while for Cardinal Giovanni Battista Tolomei he produced the altarpiece of the Conception with God the Father, St. John the Baptist and an Angel for the church of the Maddalena in Pistoia. Together with other famous artists of the time, including Conca, Pietro Bianchi and Giovanni Odazzi, he painted parts of the series illustrating the Life of Alexander VII, commissioned by Cardinal Antonio Felice Zondadari. Costanzi himself contributed the scenes of Fabio Chigi, later Alexander VII, Arriving at the Congress of Munster and Cardinal Zondadari Taking Leave of the Spanish Officials (the latter is signed and dated 1727; both Rome, Galleria Nazionale d'Arte Antica); and Cardinal Zondadari Blessing the People near Rome (signed and dated 1728; Minneapolis Institute of Art). These paintings are rather Rococo in tone, reminiscent of the work of Costanzi’s teachers, Trevisani and Luti; at the same time they already show significant differences in the darker palette, the more traditional manner as well as a special sensitivity to nature, all derived from his study of Raphael and Annibale Carracci.

For the Royal Palace of Turin Costanzi painted two classical subjects for overdoor panels, Clelia before Porsenna (signed and dated 1749) and the Continence of Scipio (both Royal Palace of Turin). Mercury Leading the Arts towards Eternal Fame (signed and dated 1750) was probably painted for Marchese Andrea Gerini of Florence. He also produced paintings for Cardinal Domenico Orsini d'Aragona, including the Allegory of the Treaty of Aquileia (1752; Livorno, Leonardini priv. col.)

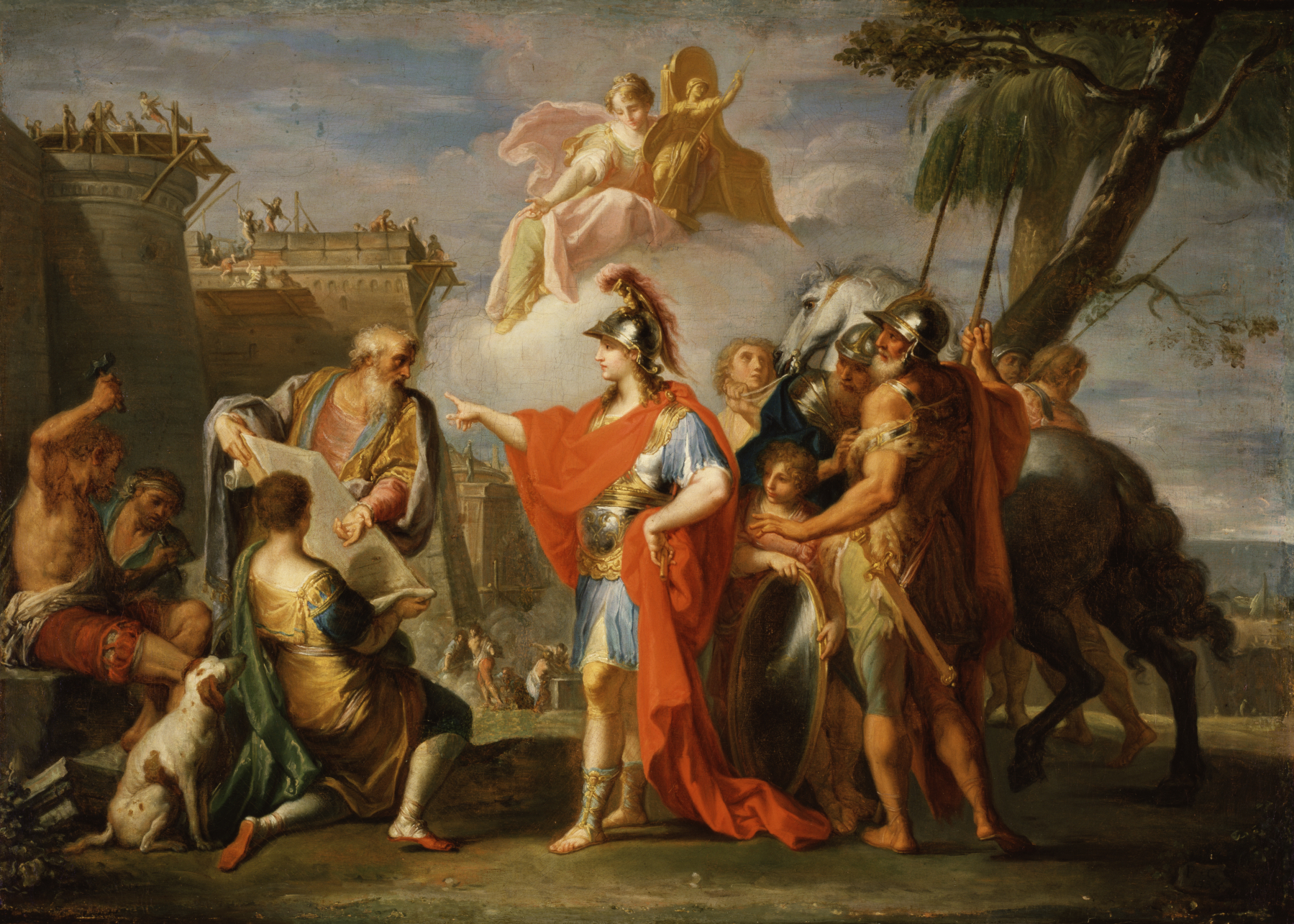
Alexander the Great Founding Alexandria, Walters Art Museum, Baltimore

Among Costanzi’s prestigious foreign commissions were the Founding of Alexandria for the Spanish court (signed and dated 1737; La Granja, San Ildefonso, Royal Palace of Riofrío), part of the decoration of the throne-room at La Granja, in which other Roman artists – Francesco Trevisani, Conca and Imperiali – also participated. For Ernst Guido, Count of Harrach, he made two paintings of biblical subjects (1750–51; Rohrau, Schloss); and for George Keith, 10th Earl Marischal, a sketch of the Battle of Bannockburn (1751) and a portrait (1752; National Portrait Gallery, London).

Costanzi also took part in some important projects of church decoration both in Rome and in the Lazio region. In 1727 he produced the fresco of the Apotheosis of Saints Gregory and Romuald (Rome, San Gregorio Magno al Celio), where, amid echoes of Ricci (in the figure of God the Father), Gaulli and Odazzi, there is a calm classicism deriving from Carlo Maratta. This figurative tendency was consolidated in the later decoration (1730) of Santa Maria Maddalena, Rome, and in that of the church of Castel San Pietro (1732), near Palestrina. In the modello (1730; Malibu, CA, J. Paul Getty Museum) for the frescoed vault in Santa Maria Maddalena, Rome, a Rococo gaiety envelops the main figures, which are also inspired by early 17th-century classicism. The fresco in Castel San Pietro, of St. Peter Triumphant over Paganism, is characterized by a frontality and a lack of depth, along with echoes, in the figures, of works by Raphael and the frescoed pendentives by Domenichino in Sant'Andrea della Valle, Rome.

Among Costanzi’s vast output of religious paintings, Pio mentions altarpieces sent to L'Aquila, to Girona in Spain and to Lima, Peru (for the Dominicans), as well as four pictures sent to France. The Redeemer Blessing, which, together with the Immaculate Conception (both Rome, Galleria dell'Accademia Nazionale di San Luca), was probably the reception piece for the artist’s admission to the academy in 1741, shows a search for formal perfection and compositional equilibrium anticipating the canons later formulated by Winckelmann. This made Costanzi one of the most significant forerunners of the Neoclassical movement. The Miracle of St. Joseph of Copertino (1750; Rome, Galleria Nazionale d'Arte Antica) foreshadows the Romantic taste in the use of figures in costume – a constant motif in so much 18th-century painting from Giuseppe Passeri to Giuseppe Cades.

=== Later works ===
The Resurrection of Tabitha (Rome, Santa Maria degli Angeli e dei Martiri), painted for St. Peter's Basilica, shows the accentuated classicism of Costanzi’s stylistic language in its full maturity. Payment for this altarpiece was made from 1736 to 1740, but it was probably modified by the artist in 1757–58 (as is shown by the date added to the painting). A bozzetto (Kunsthalle Bremen) shows the changes he made.

For the French Benedictine abbey of Baume-les-Dames (near Besançon), commissioned by the Abbess Henriette de Crux de Dames, he painted three canvases. These represent the Presentation of the Virgin at the Temple (signed and dated 1758; Besançon, Chapelle du Lycée), the Flight into Egypt and Christ among the Doctors (signed and dated 1759; both Besançon, St. François Xavier). These are among Costanzi’s last works and again use classical schemes. The Martyrdom of St. Torpes, commissioned by the deputies of San Ranieri for Pisa Cathedral, was left unfinished (model; National Museum of San Matteo, Pisa) on Costanzi’s death and completed by his pupil Giovanni Battista Tempesti.

Costanzi collaborated with such landscape artists as Giovanni Battista Busiri and Jan Frans van Bloemen, painting the figures for their landscapes. Among these were the View of the Colosseum from the Vialone della Navicella (1737; Rome, Galleria dell'Accademia Nazionale di San Luca) and the decoration (1741–42) of the coffeehouse at the Quirinal Palace in Rome. Costanzi was a member of the Pontifical Academy of Fine Arts and Letters of the Virtuosi al Pantheon and of the Accademia di San Luca (1741), of which he was elected Principe in 1758–59.

== Gallery ==
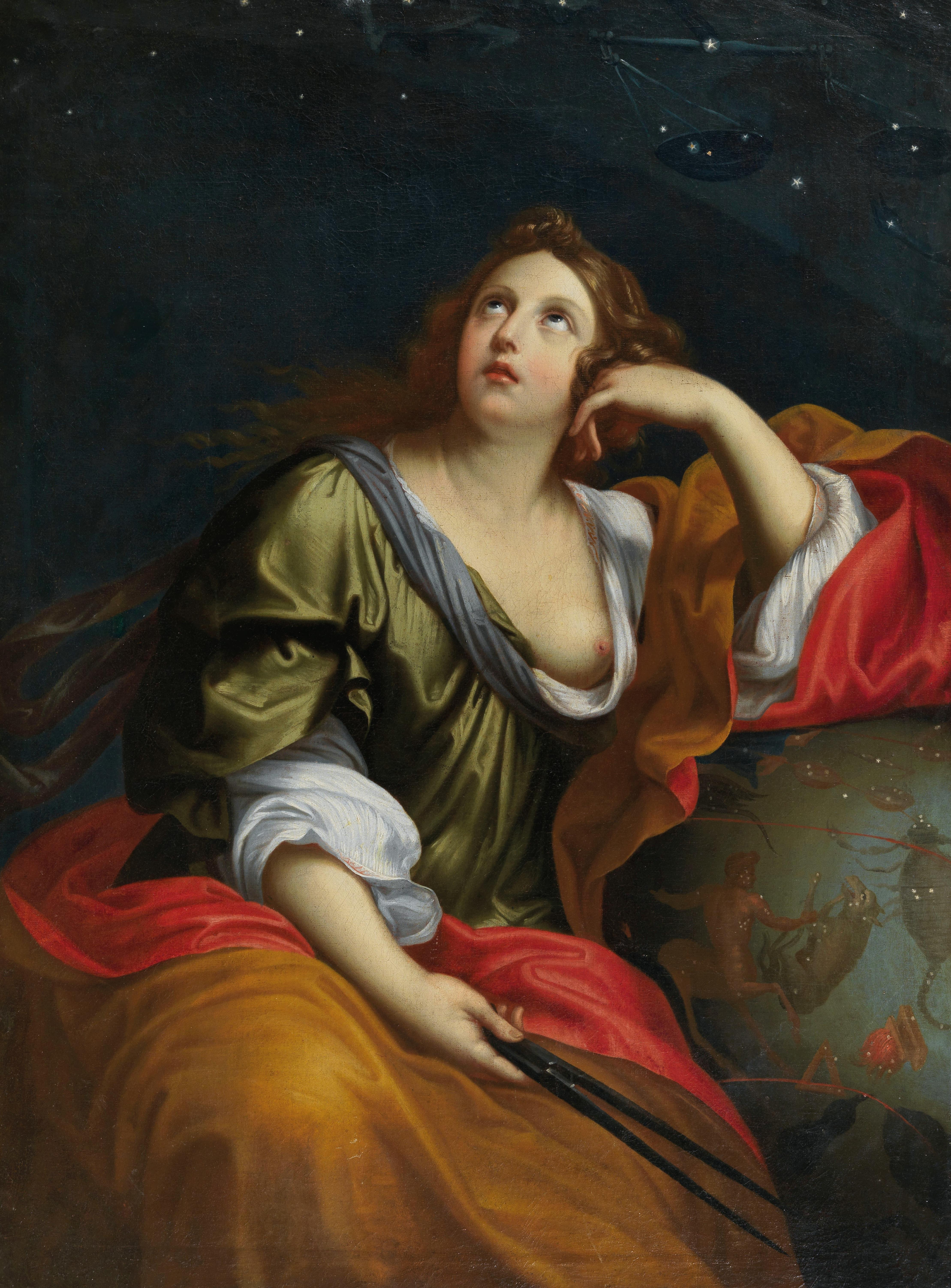
An Allegory of Astrology, Priv. col.

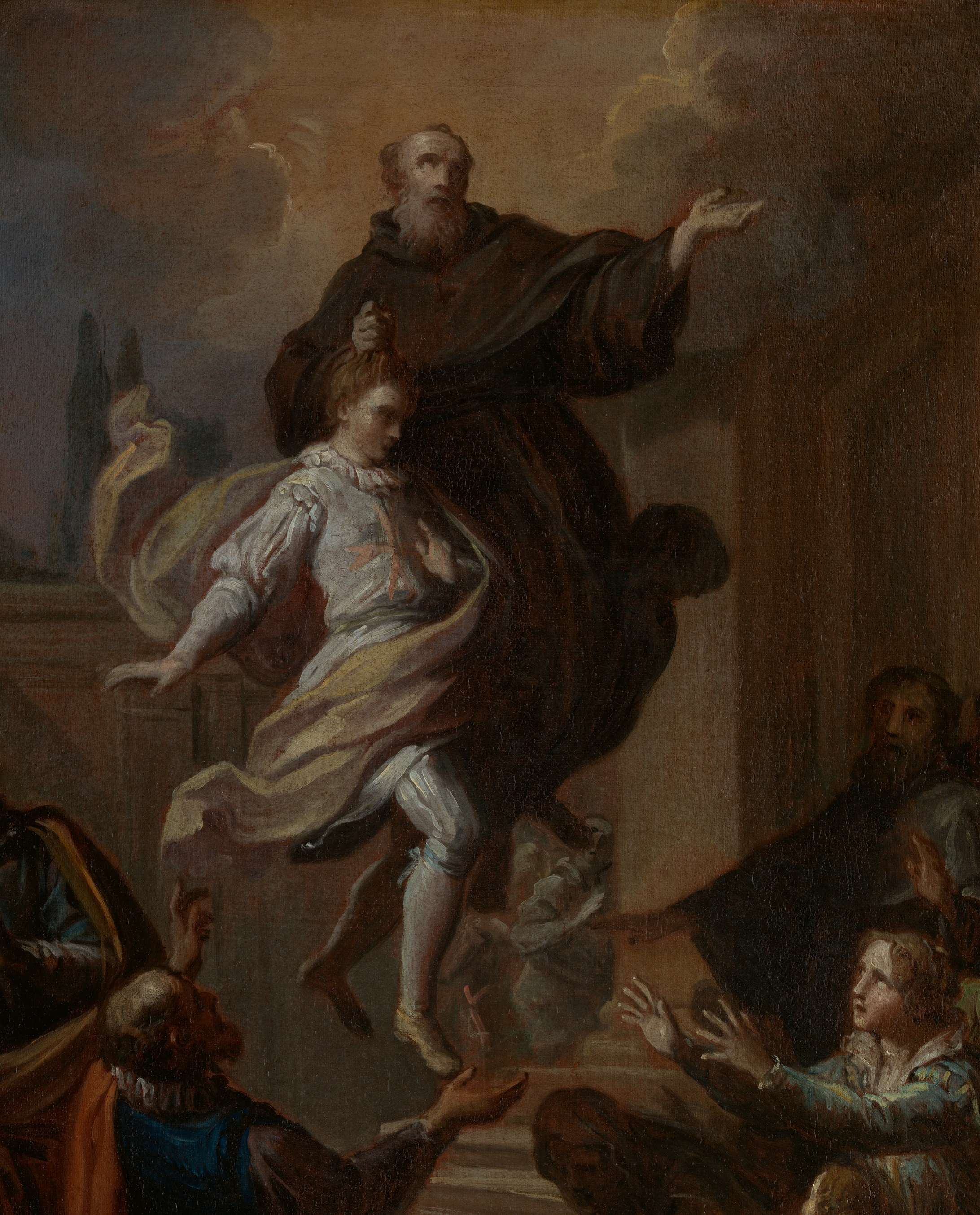
A Miracle of Saint Joseph of Cupertino, Metropolitan Museum of Art, New York

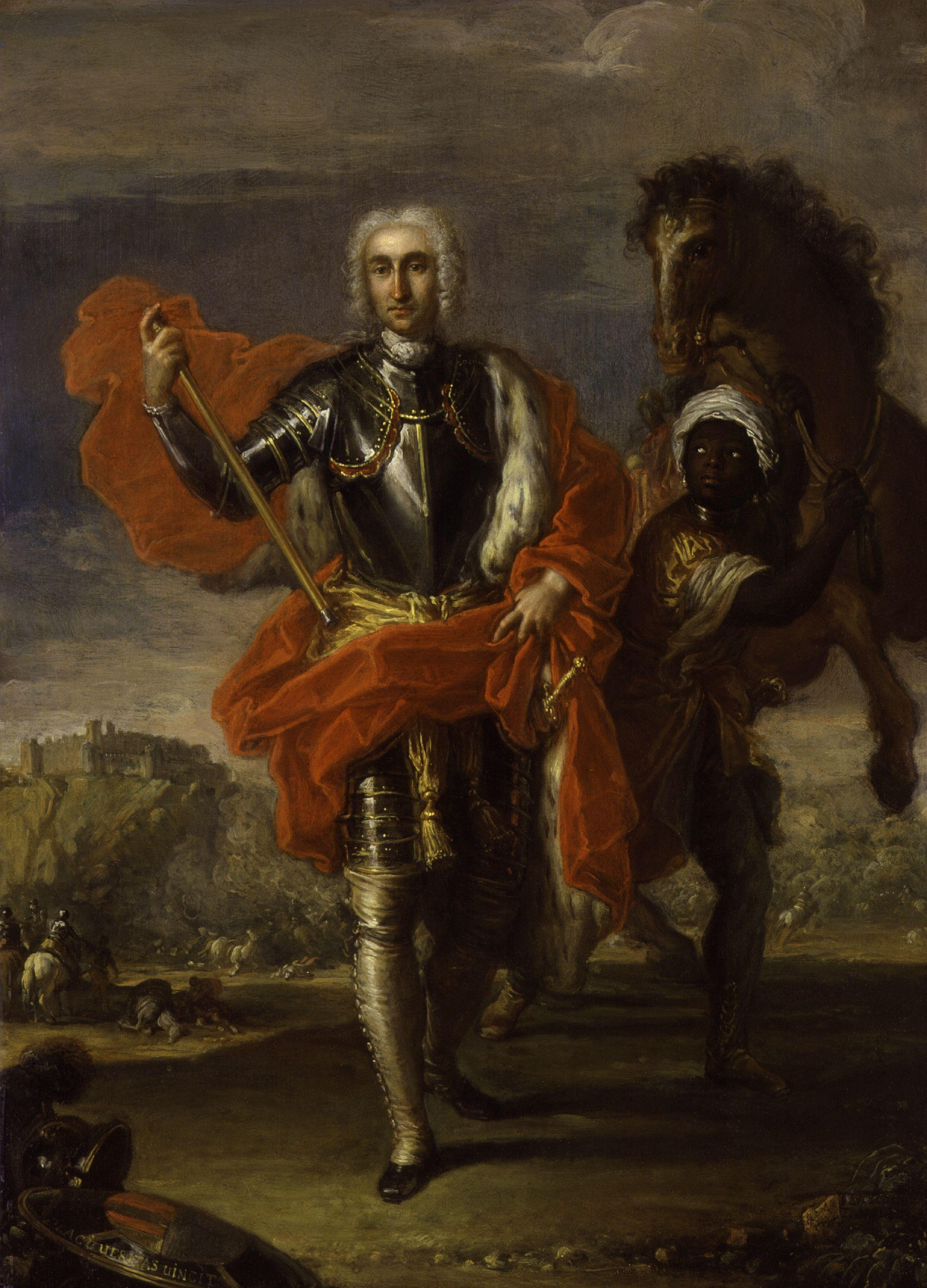
Portrait of George Keith, 10th Earl Marischal, National Portrait Gallery, London

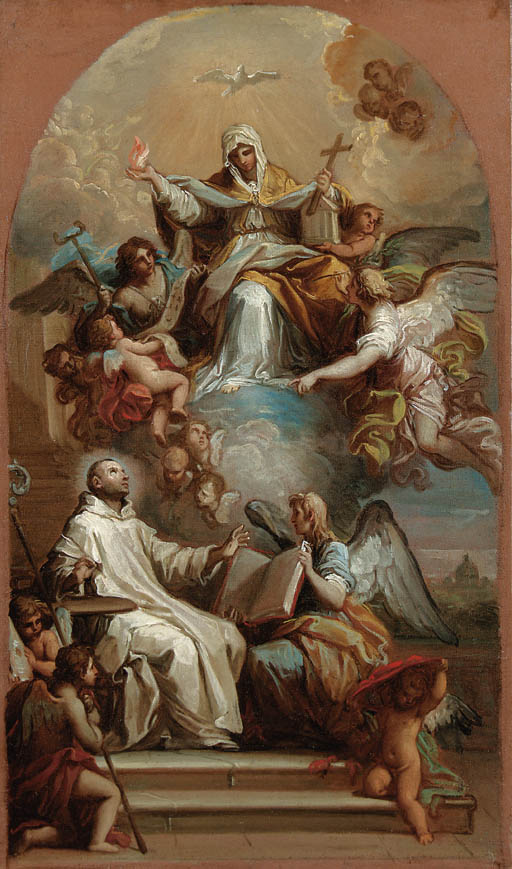
The Virgin in mourning appearing in a vision to Saint Bruno, bozzetto, priv. col.

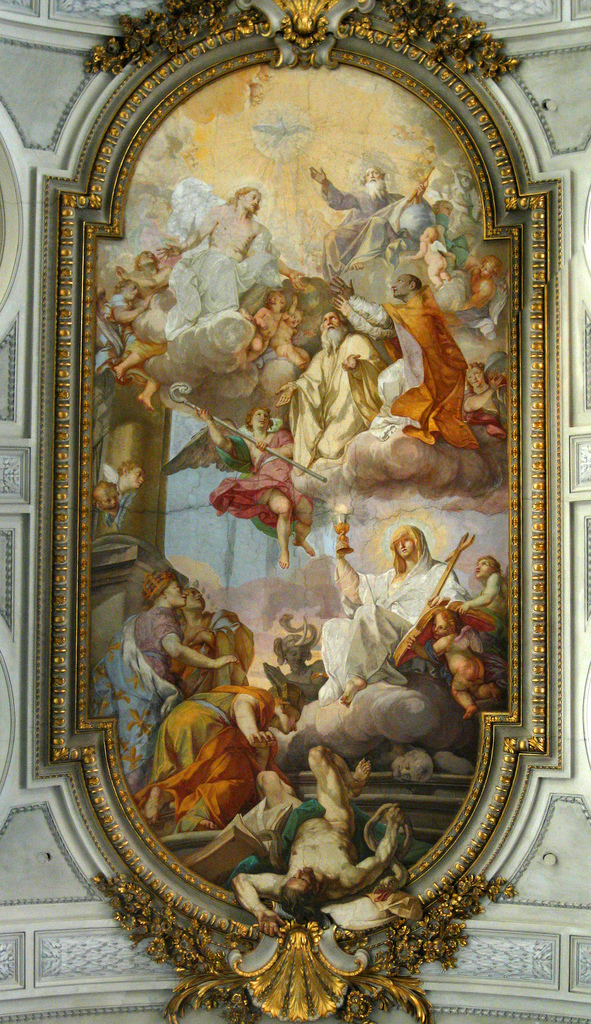
Triumph of St. Gregory, San Gregorio al Celio

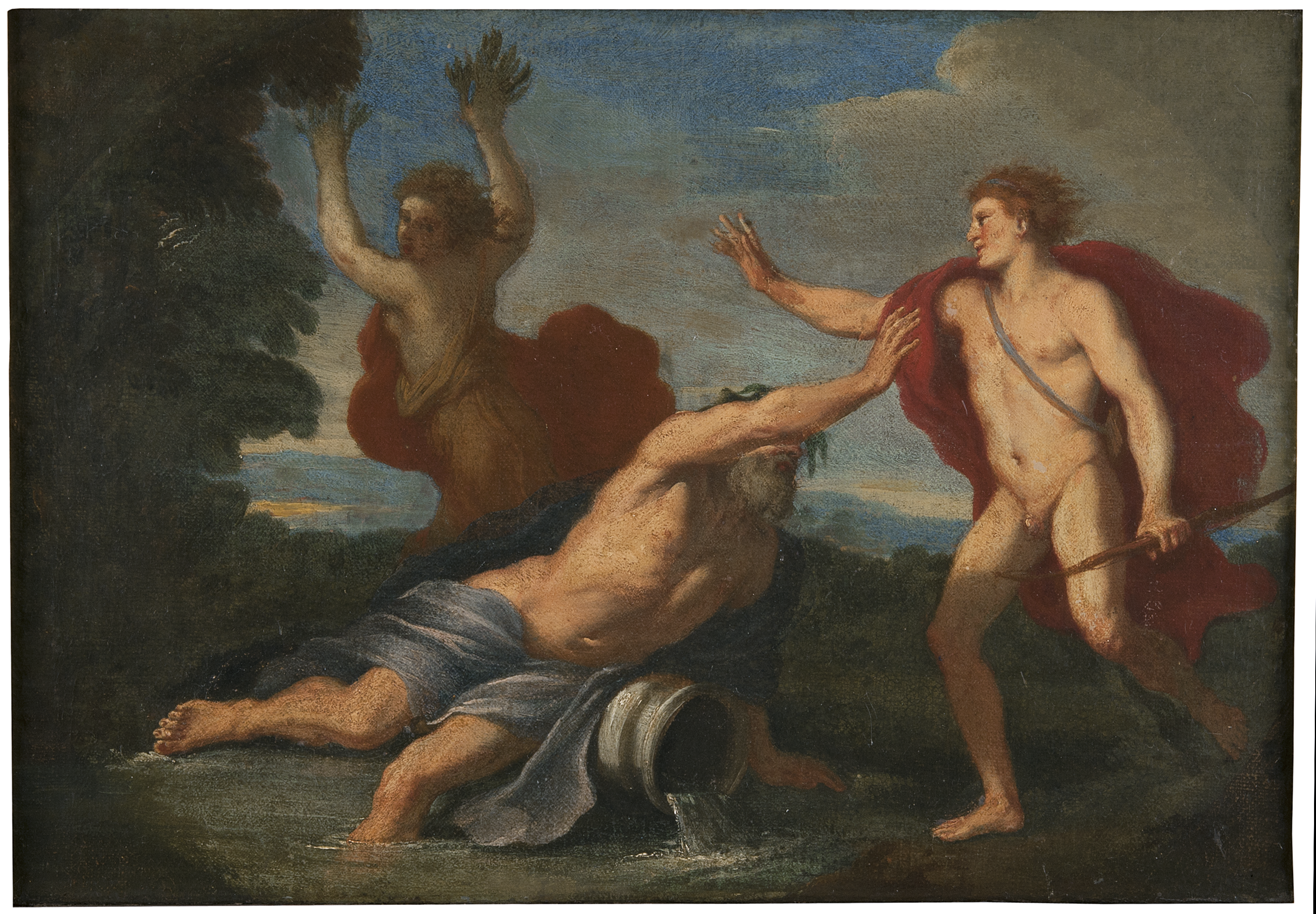
Apollo and Daphne, Nationalmuseum, Stockholm

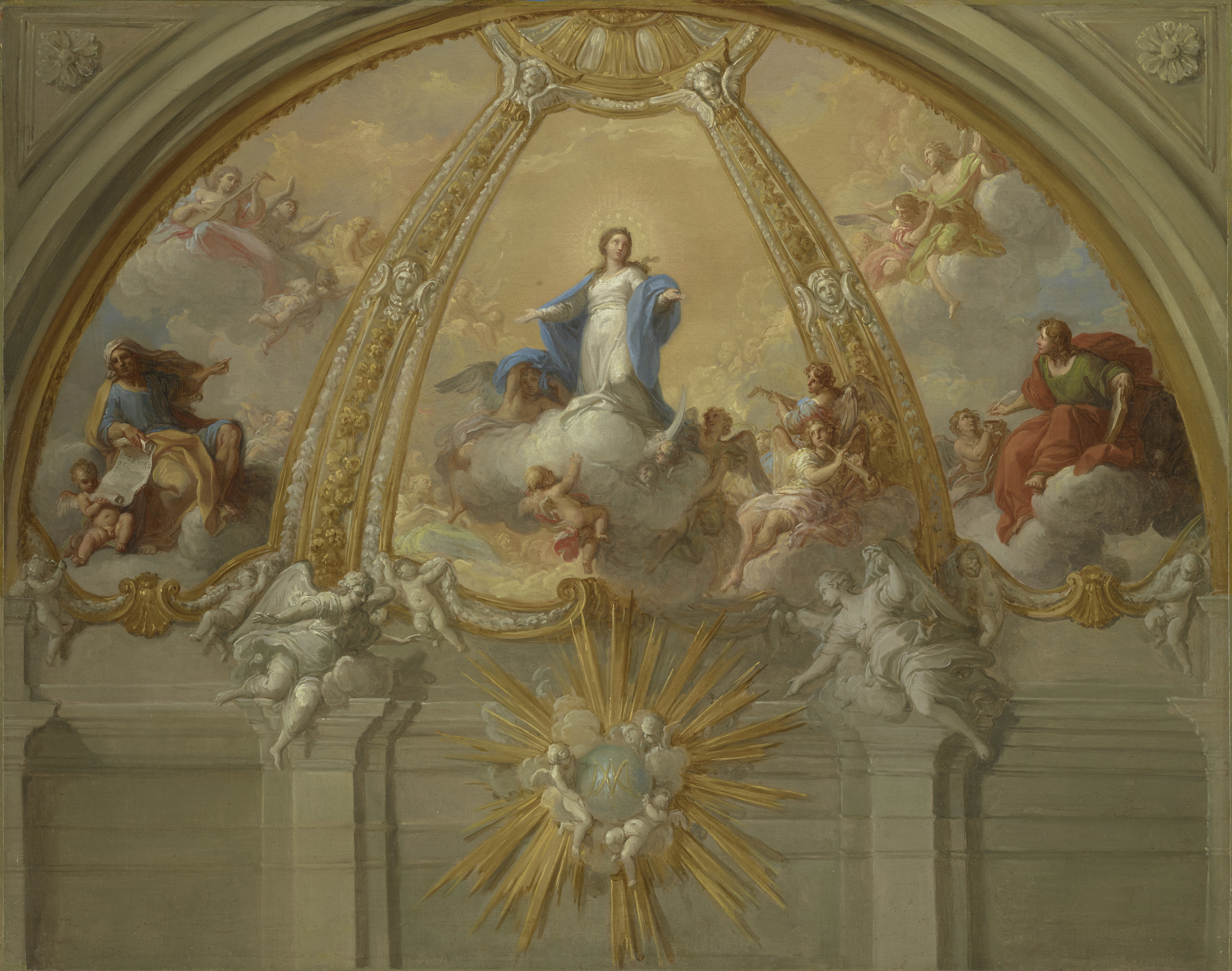
Immaculate Conception, Getty Center, Malibu

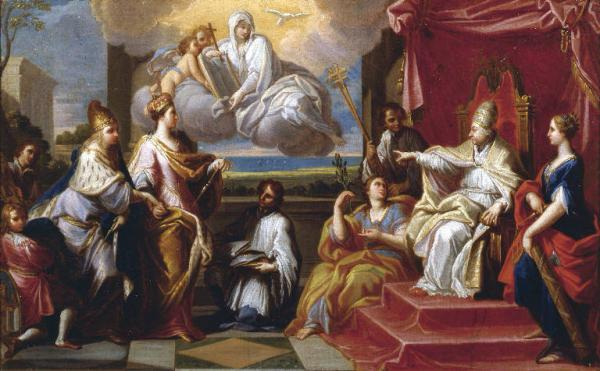
Arbitrato di papa Benedetto XIV, Museo dell'Accademia Carrara, Bergamo

== See also ==
- Sebastiano Conca
- Agostino Masucci
- Jacopo Zoboli
- Pompeo Batoni

== Bibliography ==
- Pio, Nicola (1977). C. Enggass; R. Enggass (eds.). Le vite di pittori scultori et architetti. Rome: Libreria Editrice Vaticana. pp. 194–5, 297–9.
- Bryan, Michael (1886). Robert Edmund Graves (ed.). Dictionary of Painters and Engravers, Biographical and Critical. Vol. I: A-K. London: George Bell and Sons. p. 316.
- Faldi, Italo (1977). "Gli inizi del neoclassicismo in pittura nella prima metà del Settecento". Nuove idee e nuova arte nel ’700 italiano. Atti del Convegno dei Lincei: Roma, 1977. Rome: Accademia Nazionale dei Lincei. pp. 495–523.
- Clark, Anthony M. (1981). "An Introduction to Placido Costanzi". Studies in Roman Eighteenth Century Painting. Washington, DC: Decatur House Press. pp. 54–67.
- Getty biography and Getty database record
