= Jaime Marquet =

French architect

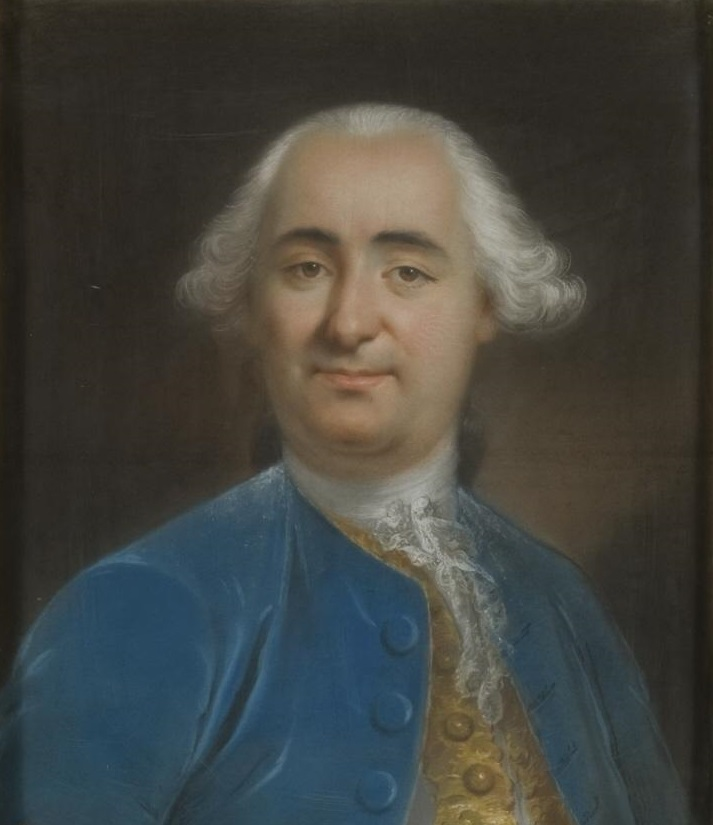
Retrato del arquitecto Marquet by Faronne Ollivier, pastel, 54 x 44 cm, Madrid, Real Academia de Bellas Artes de San Fernando.

Jaime Marquet (born Jacques Marquet, in París, 1710–1782) was a French architect who worked extensively in Bourbon Spain, and whose most important work includes the central plaza of Madrid known as Puerta del Sol and the adjacent monumental building, the Real Casa de Correos or Royal Mail Headquarters, now the offices of the President of the Community of Madrid.

== Biography ==
In the 1750s he was commissioned by Fernando de Silva, 12th Duke of Alba, who was then ambassador of Spain in Paris, to build a new palace in the family seat at Piedrahíta which occurred between 1755 and 1766.

The Duke of Alba introduced him to the court of Ferdinand VI after which he was commissioned to refurbish the cobblestones of the city of Madrid. In 1755 he entered the Real Academia de Bellas Artes de San Fernando. Between 1756 and 1760, while starting his career in the Spanish capital, King Ferdinand VI commissioned the architect Ventura Rodriguez to lead the demolition of the city blocks 205 and 206 that bordered the Puerta del Sol, and to construct a headquarters building for the Spanish postal service Correos.

In 1759, Fernando VI died, but the predilection for the French taste of the Bourbon court continued to flourish under his successor, King Carlos III, who had disagreements about style with Ventura Rodríguez. These two decisive events led to the appointment of Jaime Marquet, who took over responsibility for the design of the Puerta del Sol project in 1760 and undertook construction of the site which occurred between 1766 and 1768.

As well as the Palacio Alba in Piedrahita, Puerta de Sol and the Real Casa de Correos in Madrid Jaime Marquet was also responsible for:

- Iglesia de San Antonio (Royal church, Aranjuez, c. 1752)
- Cocheras de la Reina Madre, Aranjuez, Madrid (1758)
- Los Cuarteles de las Reales Guardias Españolas y Walonas, Aranjuez (1770–72)
- Teatro Real Coliseo de Carlos III de Aranjuez, (1767) (the first enclosed theatre built in Spain)
- Teatro Real Coliseo de Carlos III, San Lorenzo de El Escorial, Madrid (1771–72)
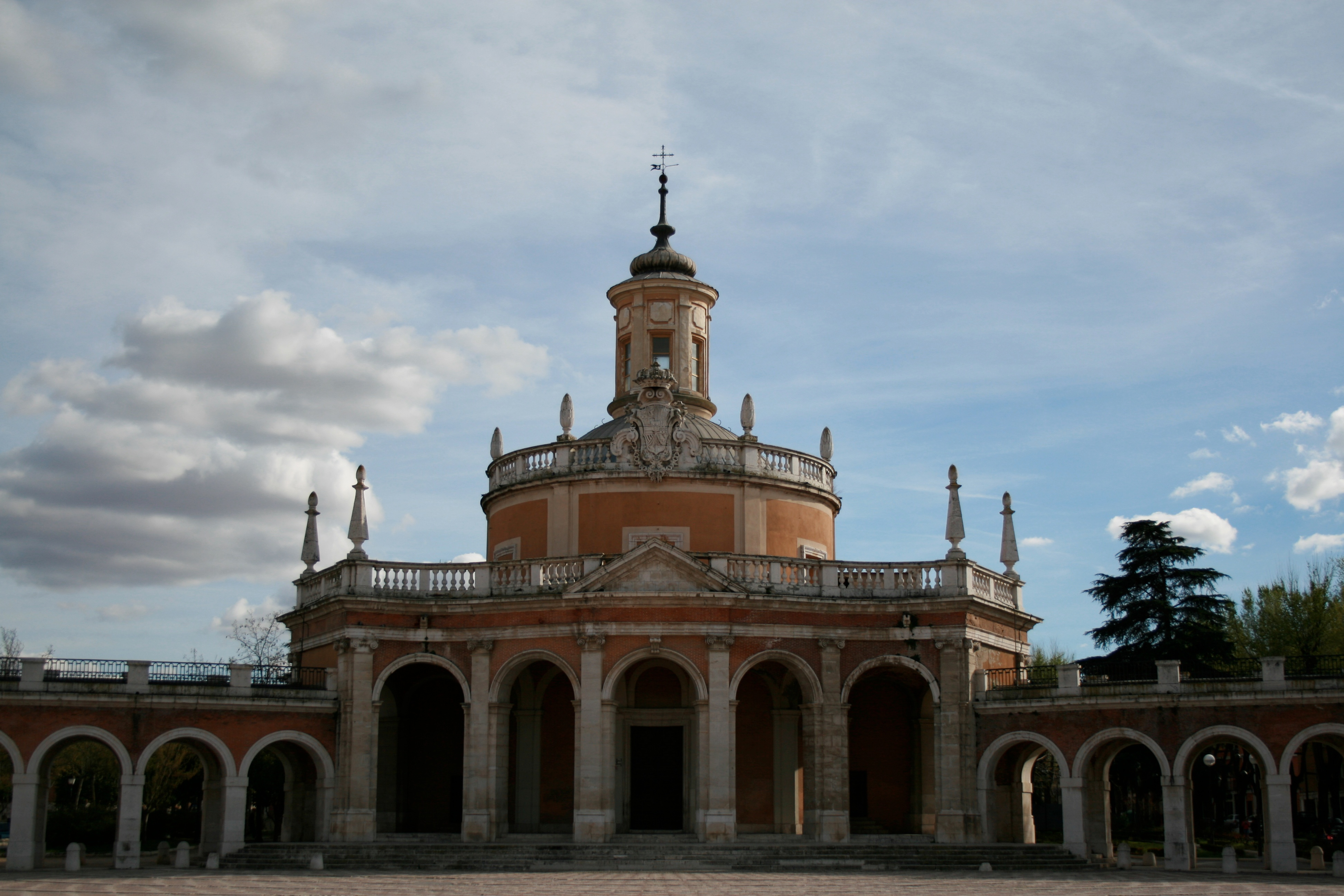
Iglesia de San Antonio (Royal church at Aranjuez, c. 1752)

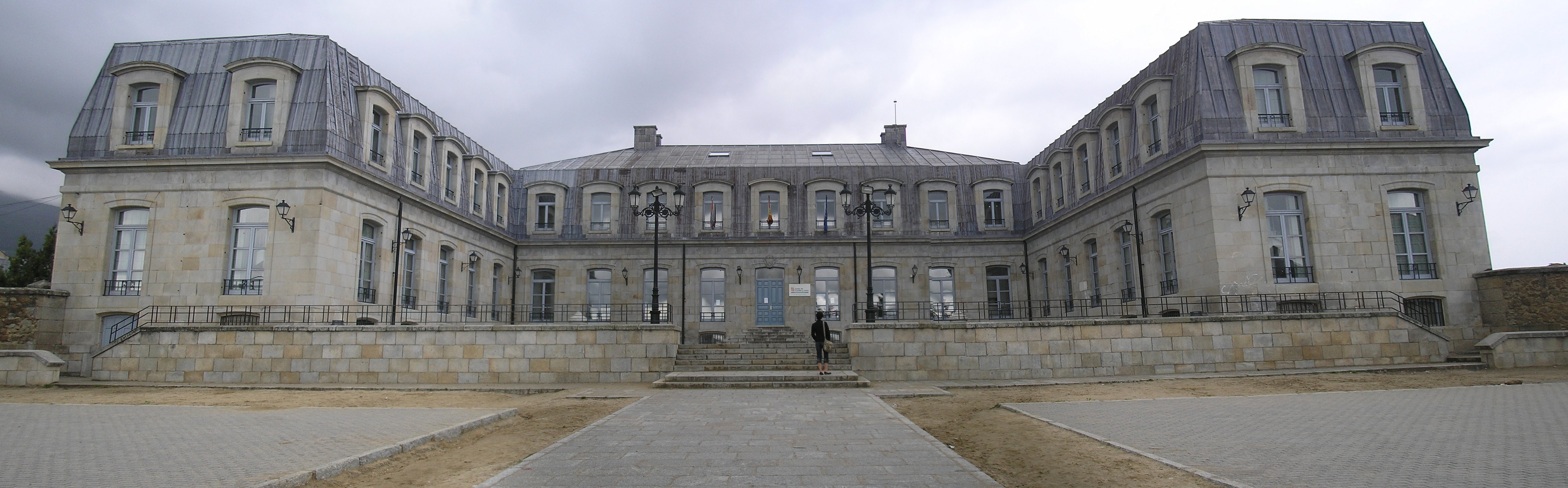
Facade of the Palacio de los duques de Alba, in Piedrahíta, built between 1755 and 1766

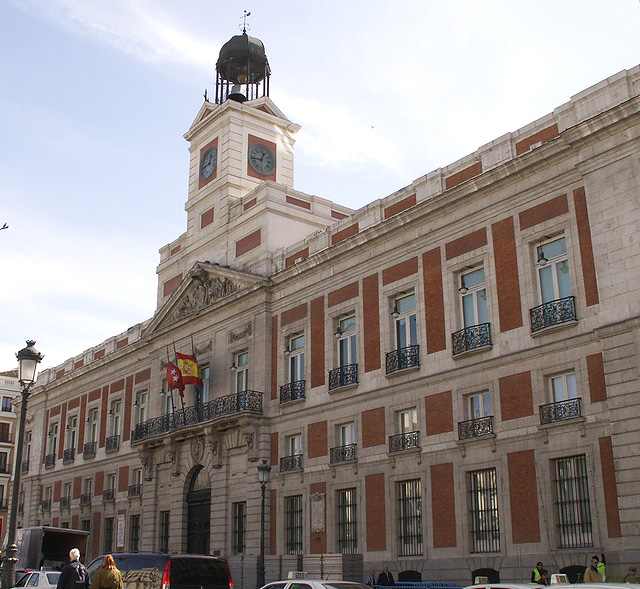
Real Casa de Correos in Madrid built between about 1760 and 1768

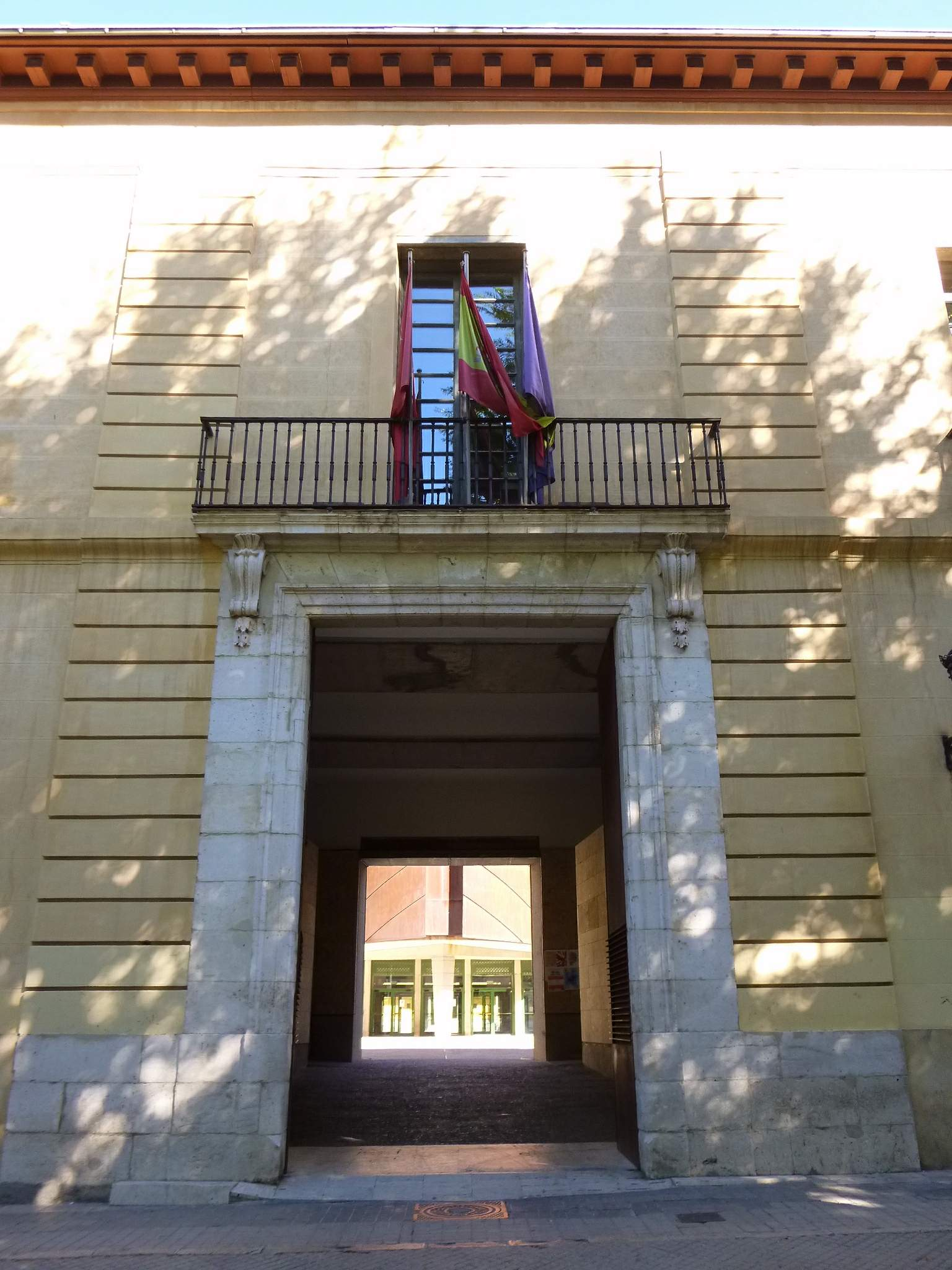
Cocheras de la Reina Madre Isabel de Farnesio (The Coach House of the Queen Mother of Carlos III)

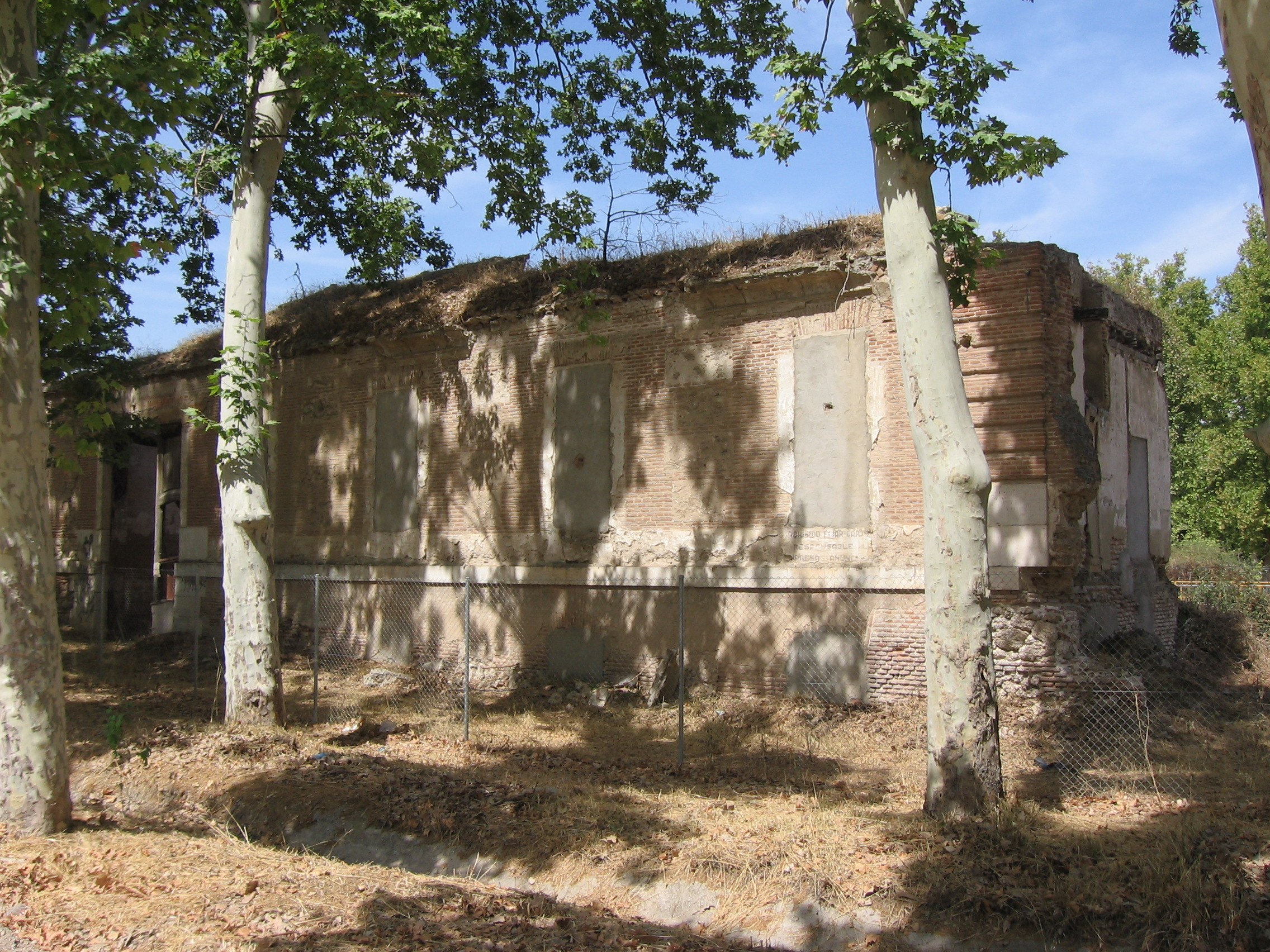
Cuartel de Guardias Españolas in Aranjuez (Barracks of the Royal Guards, now in ruins)

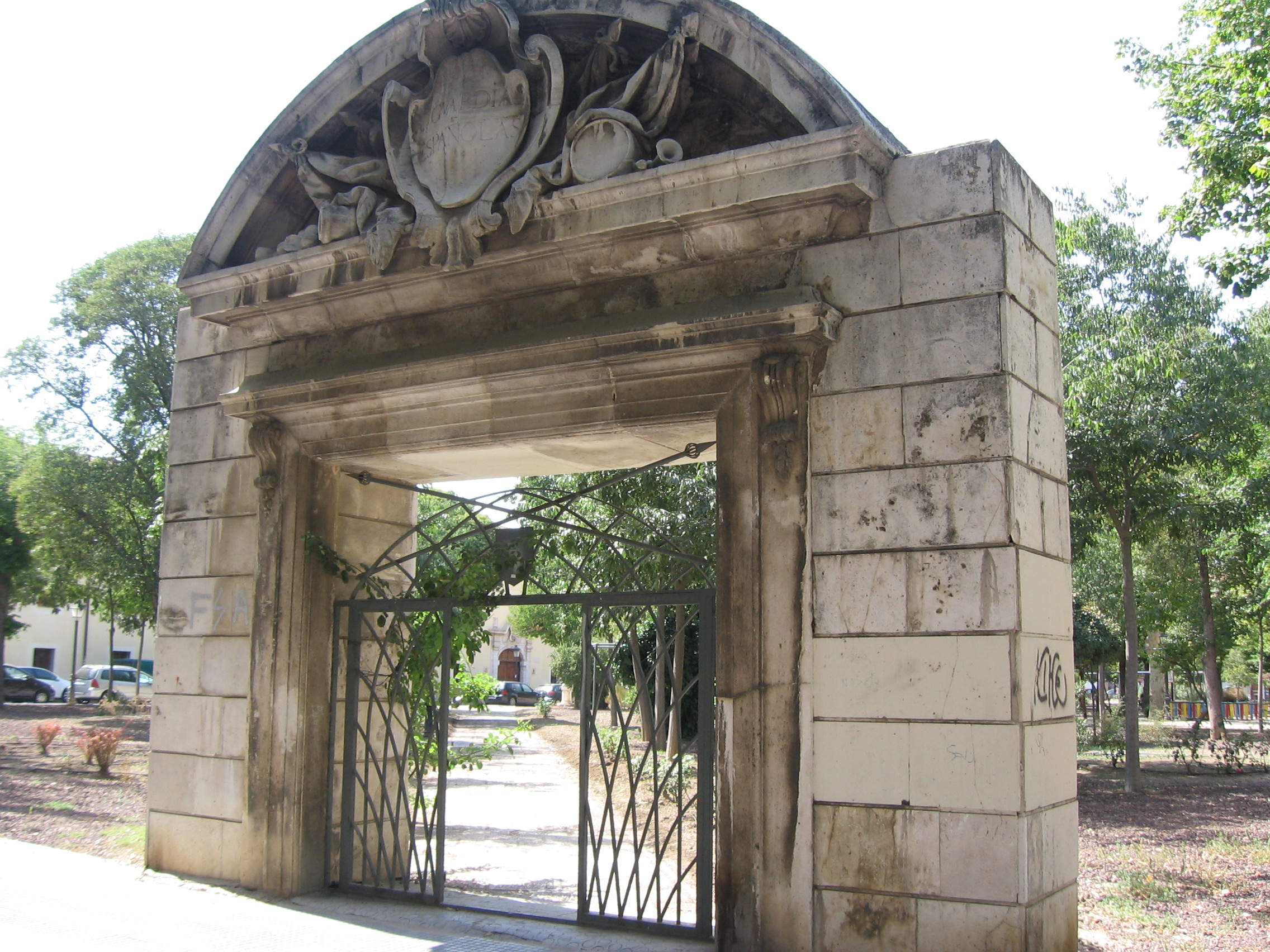
Main gate of the barracks of Spanish Guards, now relocated to a nearby public park in Aranjuez

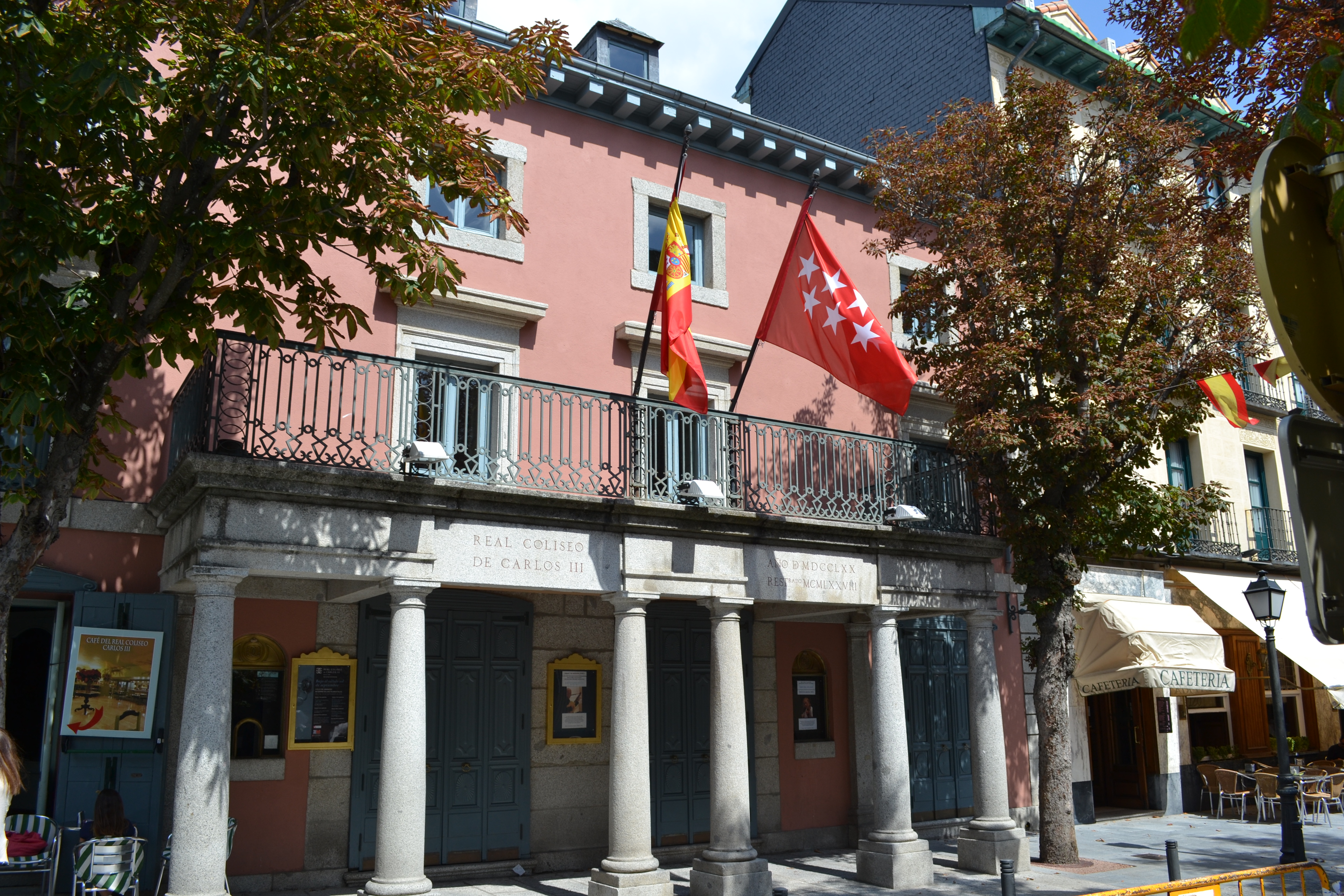
Real Coliseo de Carlos III (Theater at San Lorenzo de El Escorial)

== Literature ==
- García Melero, José Enrique (14 January 1998). Arte español de la Ilustración y del siglo XIX: En torno a la imagen del pasado (in Spanish). Encuentro. pp. 67–. ISBN 978-84-7490-478-9.
