= Boadilla del Monte =

- Town
- Flag Coat of arms

- Location of Boadilla del Monte in Madrid

- Location in the Community of Madrid Location in Spain
- Coordinates: 40°24′25″N 3°52′30″W
- Country: Spain
- Autonomous community: Madrid
- Province: Madrid
- Comarca: Madrid metropolitan area

Government
  - Alcalde: Javier Úbeda Liébana (2020) (PP)

Area
  - Total: 47.24 km^{2} (18.24 sq mi)
- Elevation: 689 m (2,260 ft)

Population (2025-01-01)
  - Total: 66,349
  - Density: 1,405/km^{2} (3,638/sq mi)
- Demonym: Boadillano
- Time zone: UTC+1 (CET)
  - Summer (DST): UTC+2 (CEST)
- Postal code: 28660
- Website: Official website

Boadilla del Monte (Spanish: [boaˈðiʎa ðel ˈmonte]) is a Spanish town and municipality located in the west of the Community of Madrid, inside its metropolitan area. It has the second highest level of income per capita in all of the country of Spain. In 2017, it had a population of 51,463.

== Symbols ==
The escutcheon representing the municipality was approved by Real Decreto on October 6, 1977:

«In a golden background, five green hoalm oaks in a sotuer position; surrounded by a black chain. On top, the royal crown»

— Boletín Oficial del Estado nº 266 de 7/11/1977

The textual description of the flag, approved with an agreement on February 22, 2007, is the following:

«2:3 rectangular flag, divided vertically in two equal parts, green the left one and yellow the right one. In the middle, Boadilla del Monte's municipal escutcheon with its colors.»

== History ==
The placename could come from the Arabic "Boadil-la", showing a Saracen domain of the territory. Another option is that the name comes from "boa", word that in the 13th century meant "rush-like plant".

In the 15th century, the Catholic Monarchs gave Don. Andrés Cabrera and his wife, Doña Beatriz de Boadilla, the noble rank of Count and Countess of Chinchón, being Boadilla part of their territory. The "Señorío de Boadilla del Monte" had owners such as the Count of Toreno and the Marquess of Mirabal. Doña Josefa de Mirabal, 3rd Marchioness of Mirabal, had the permission of Castilla's Council to sell this señorío to the Infante Don Luis, who ordered Ventura Rodriguez, a neoclassic architect, to restyle the old Palace of the Two Towers.

In the middle of the 19th century, Boadilla added to its municipal limits the old municipality of Romanillos, with only 30 inhabitants.

The town –at that time little more than a village– was the scene of a fierce battle in December 1936 in which the International Brigades (including Winston Churchill's nephew, Esmond Romilly) fought to defend Madrid against Franco's insurgent army. The battle lasted three days, during which most of Romilly's British comrades were killed.

== Geography ==
=== Location ===
The municipality is located at an altitude of 682 MSL, in a terrain crossed by creeks, as well as the Guadarrama river. In it we can find big areas of holm oaks and pine trees. Although it has a varied topography, the slope is smooth, generally S.W. oriented.

The municipality is located to the west of Madrid, and shares borders with Majadahonda to the north, Villaviciosa de Odón and Alcorcón to the south, Pozuelo de Alarcón to the east, and Villanueva de la Cañada and Brunete to the west.

=== Soil ===
Almost all municipality's terrain is lower Miocene soil, classified inside the "samartiense". It is composed of limestone, marl and gypsum.

=== Climate ===
- Average annual temperature: 13,6 °C
- Average annual precipitation: 500,5 m³ between March and December.

The main winds come from the S.W., and the climate is temperate: the average temperature in January (the coldest month) is 5 °C; and in July (the hottest month), it is 24,1 °C.

=== Hydrography ===
- Rivers: Guadarrama, Aulencia.
- Creeks: Calabozo, Las Pueblas, Valenoso, Prado Grande, Los Pastores, Los Mojuelos.

=== Flora ===
Holm oaks, pine trees, oaks, ash trees...

== Demography ==
According to the INE's "Padrón Municipal para 2017", the municipality, with an area of 47,20km2, is home to 51.463 inhabitants, with a density of 1090,32 inhabitants per km2.

== Urbanism ==
Apart from the historical town, between the 60s and the 70s residential areas started to develop independently, building single family houses with big plots.

This way, part of Boadilla's forest was bought to build the Montepríncipe and Monte de las Encinas residential complexes. At the same time, in the western part of the municipality, other complexes would develop: Las Lomas, Olivar de Mirabal, Parque Boadilla, Bonanza... Recently, in this area we can find Pino Centinela, Valdecabañas and Valdepastores.

Although this residential complexes were originally thought to be sold to high purchasing power families, the cheap price of land made them accessible to a big variety of people who came from Madrid, using it as a second home.

However, with Madrid's metropolitan area growing, this complexes ended up as luxury and exclusive residential areas, similar to near ones in Pozuelo de Alarcón, Majadahonda, Las Rozas or Villaviciosa de Odón. All them are known as "Histotic Residential Complexes".

In the 80s, Boadilla's historical town grew to the west, appearing what is now known as "Residencial de las Eras". With a higher density than the "Historic Residential Complexes", homes are mainly single family terraced houses organized around the Zoco de Boadilla mall.

== Other information ==
- The registered office of Santander Bank is based there.
- Convent of las Madres Carmelitas

== Gallery ==
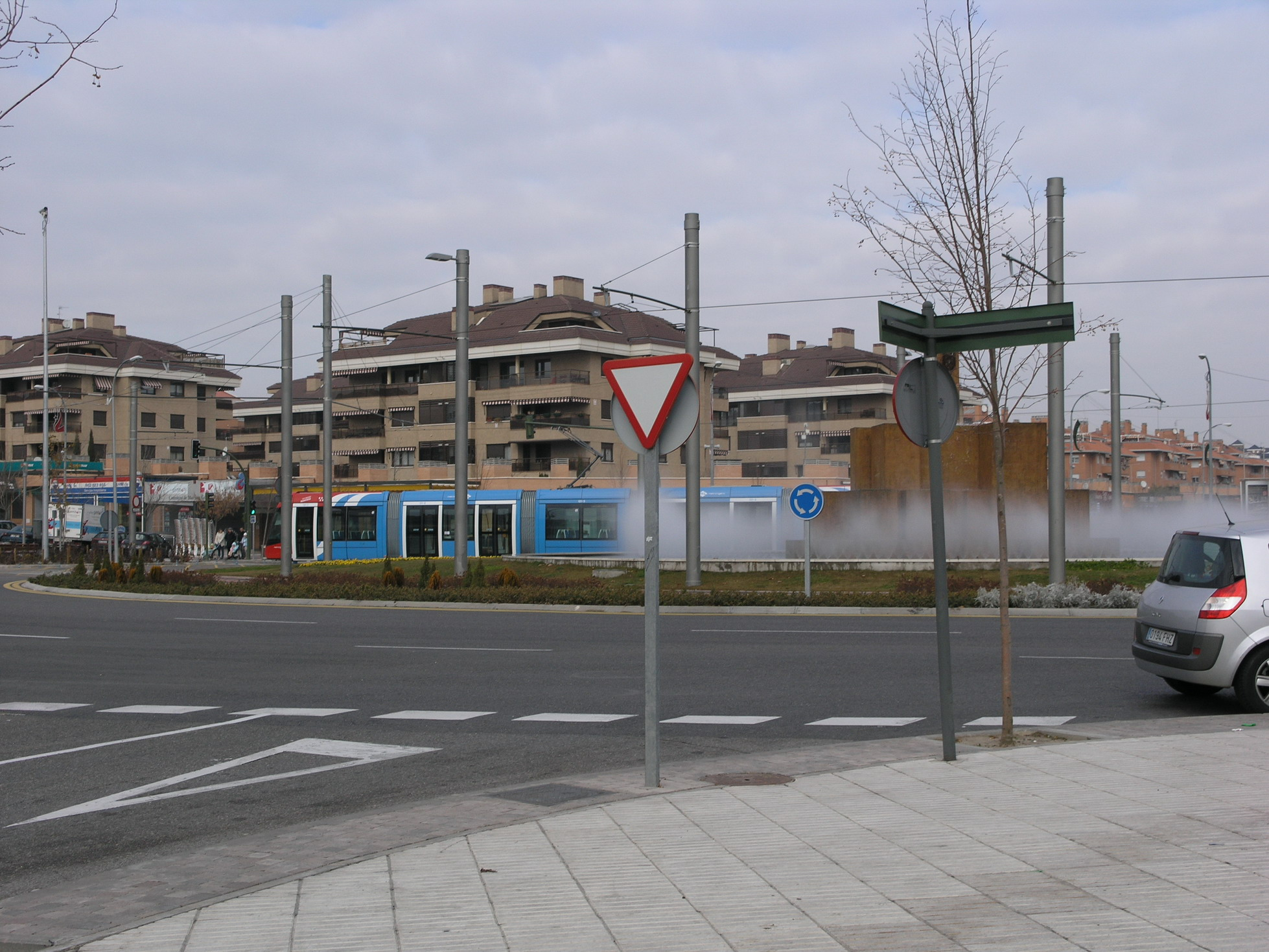
Sector Siglo XXI and the tram

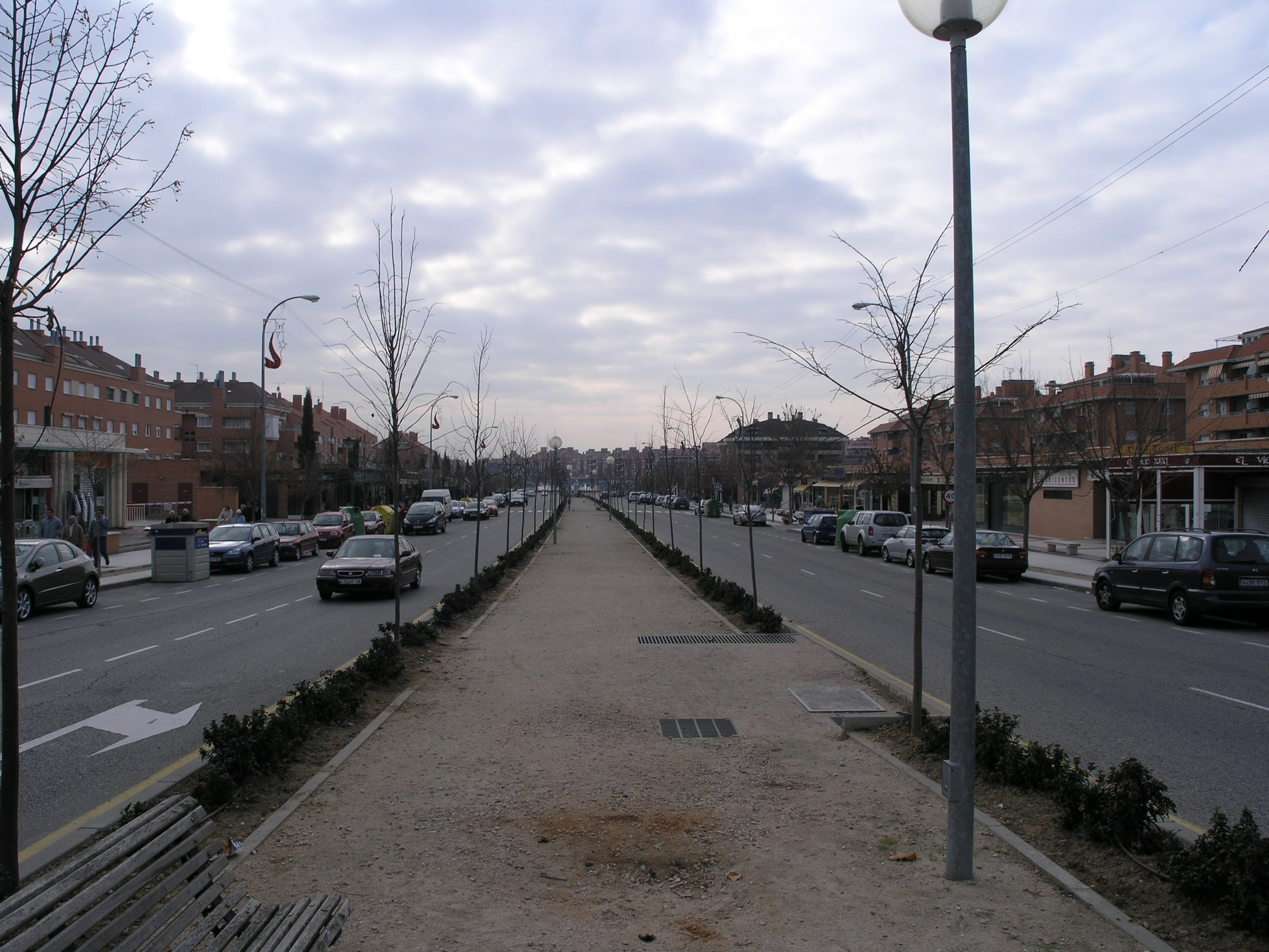
Infante Don Luis Street

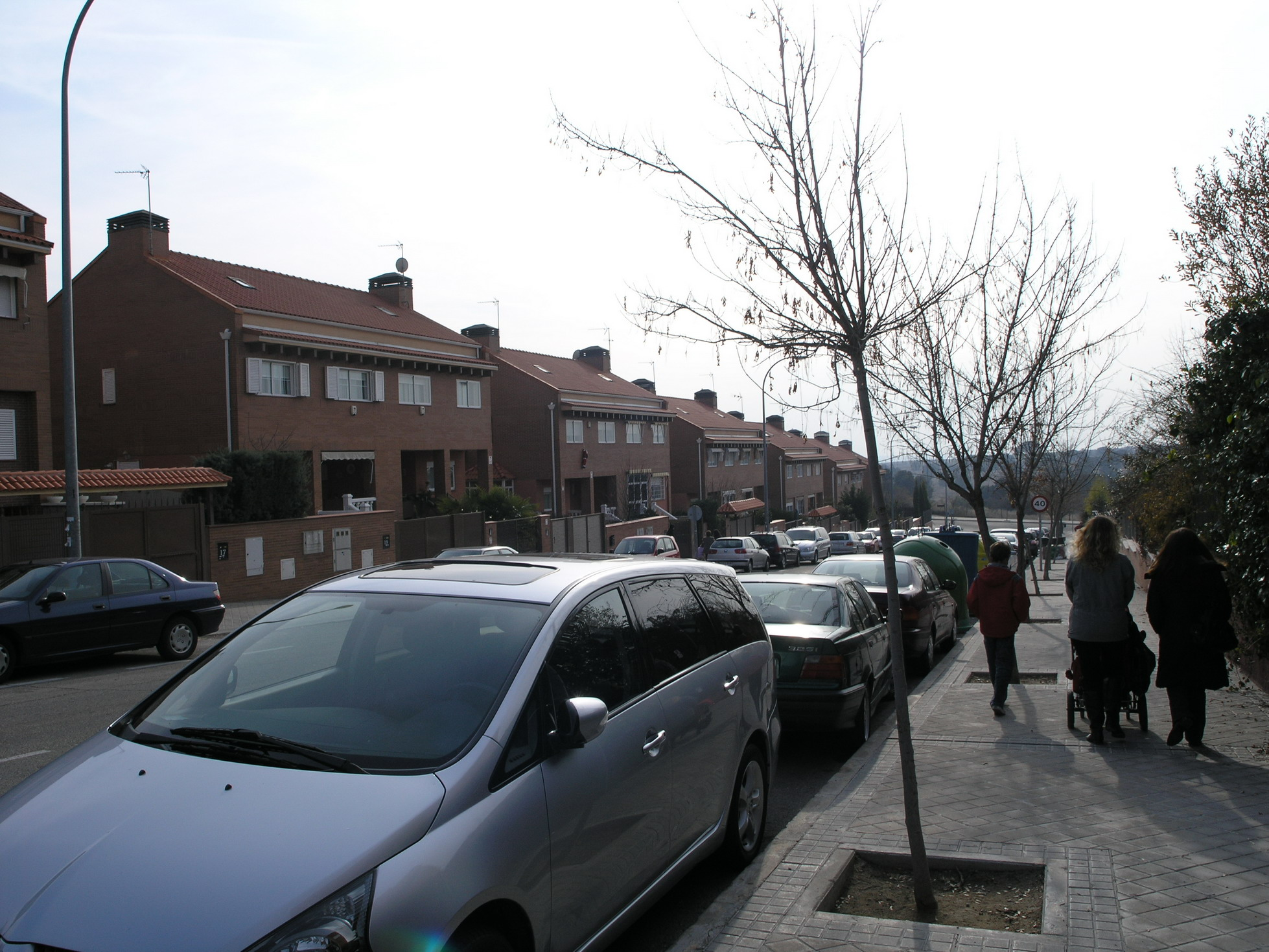
Typical street -Pio Baroja

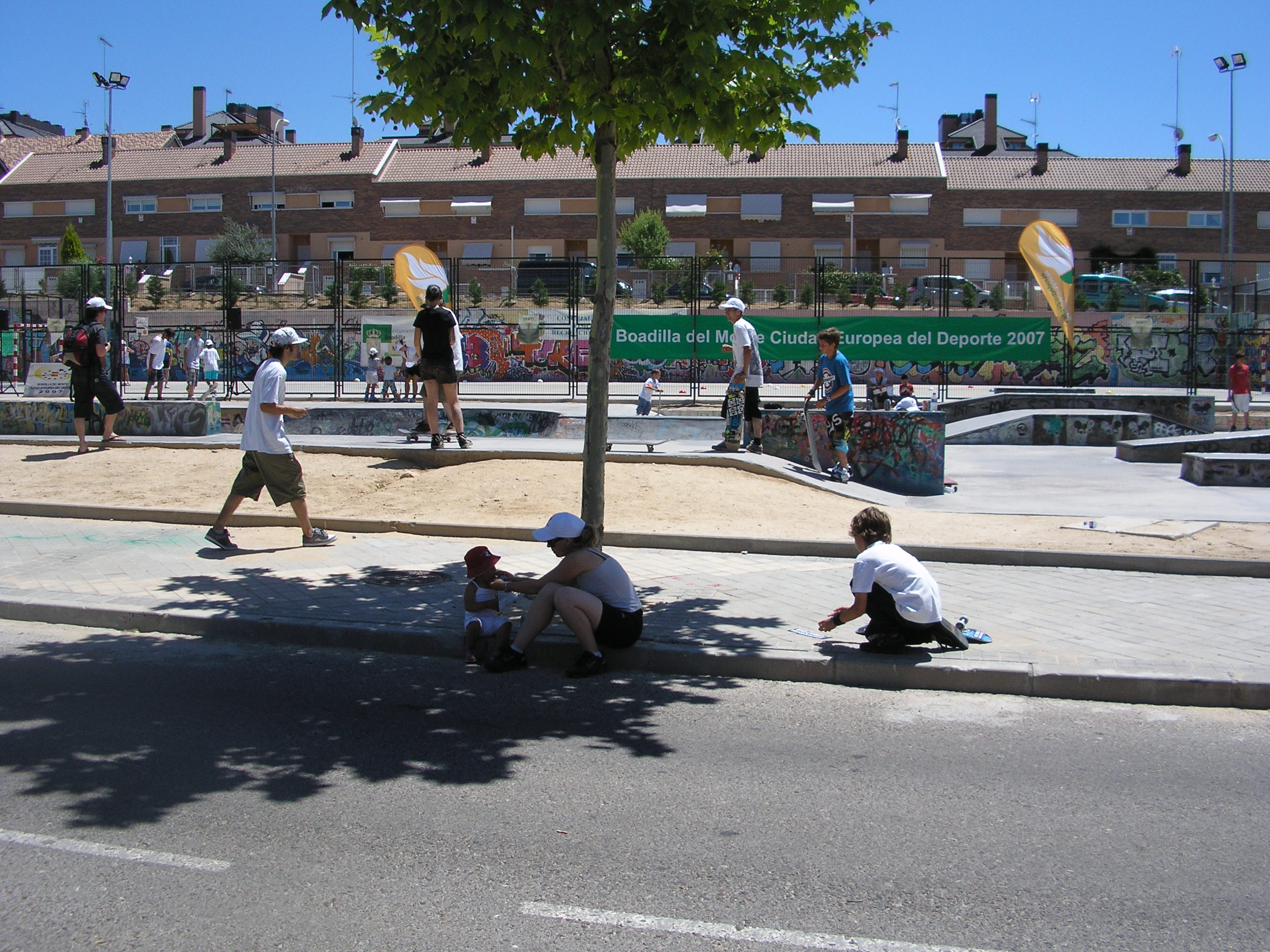
Skateboard court

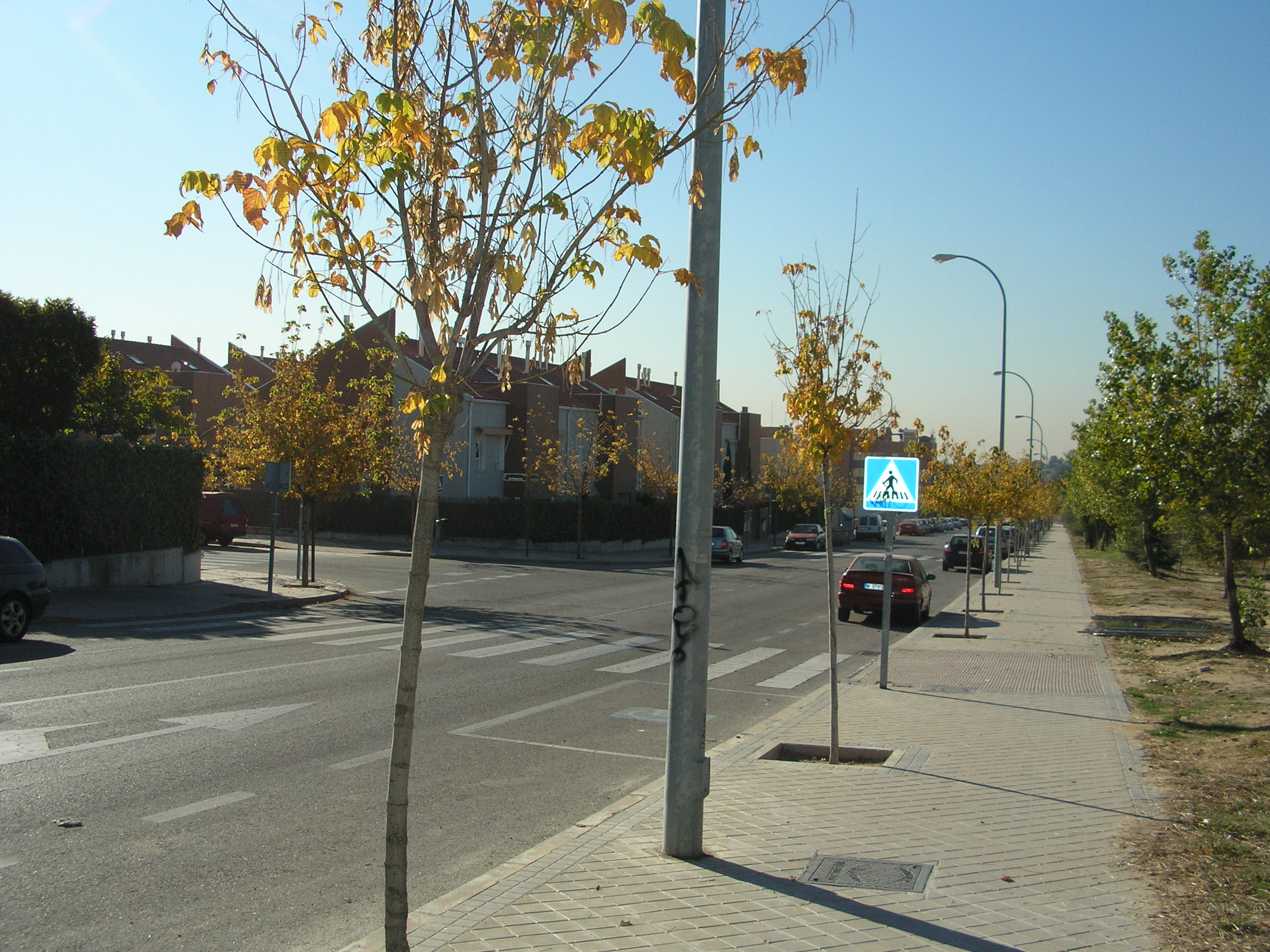
Avenida Condesa De Chinchon

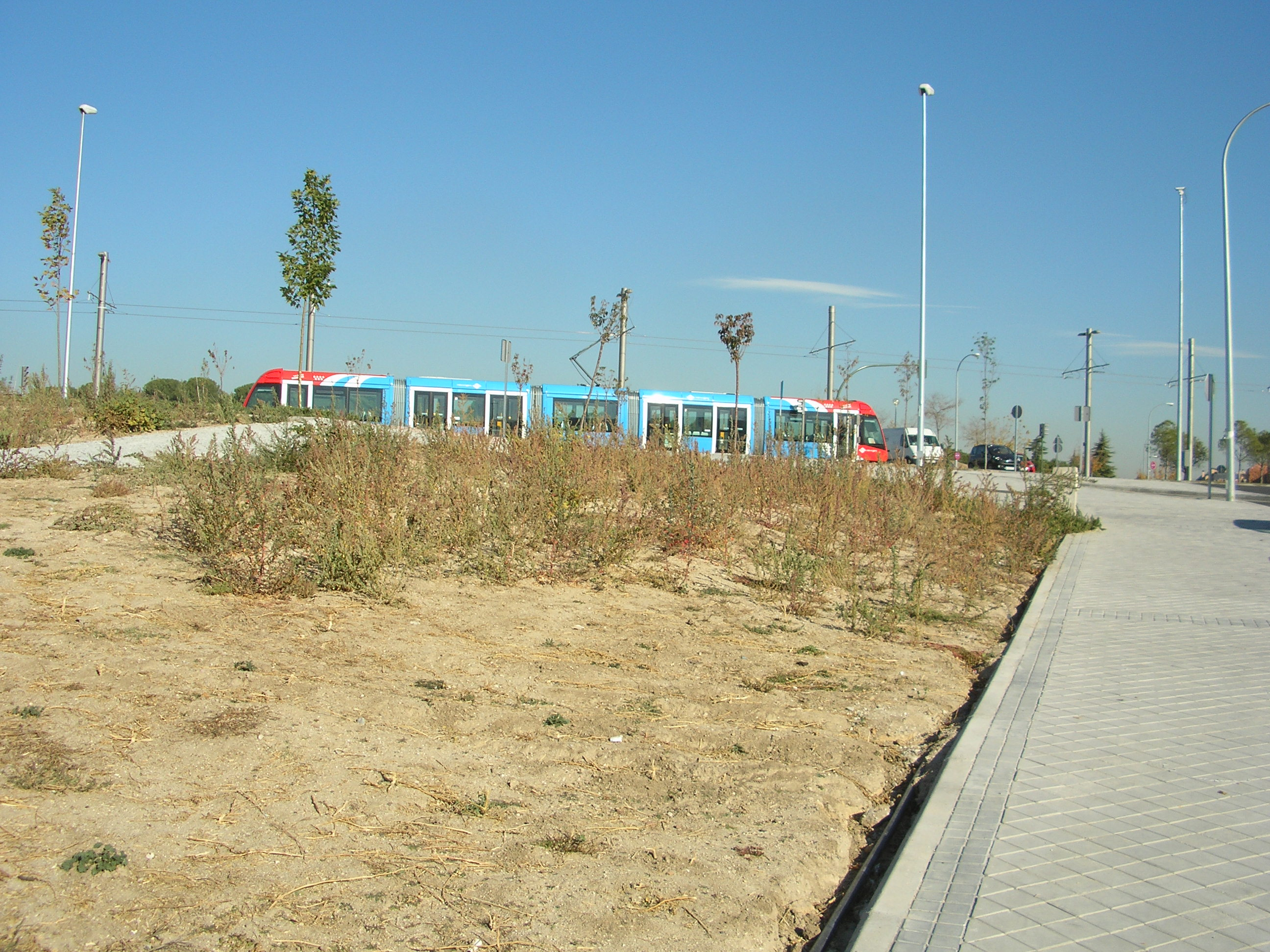
The tram

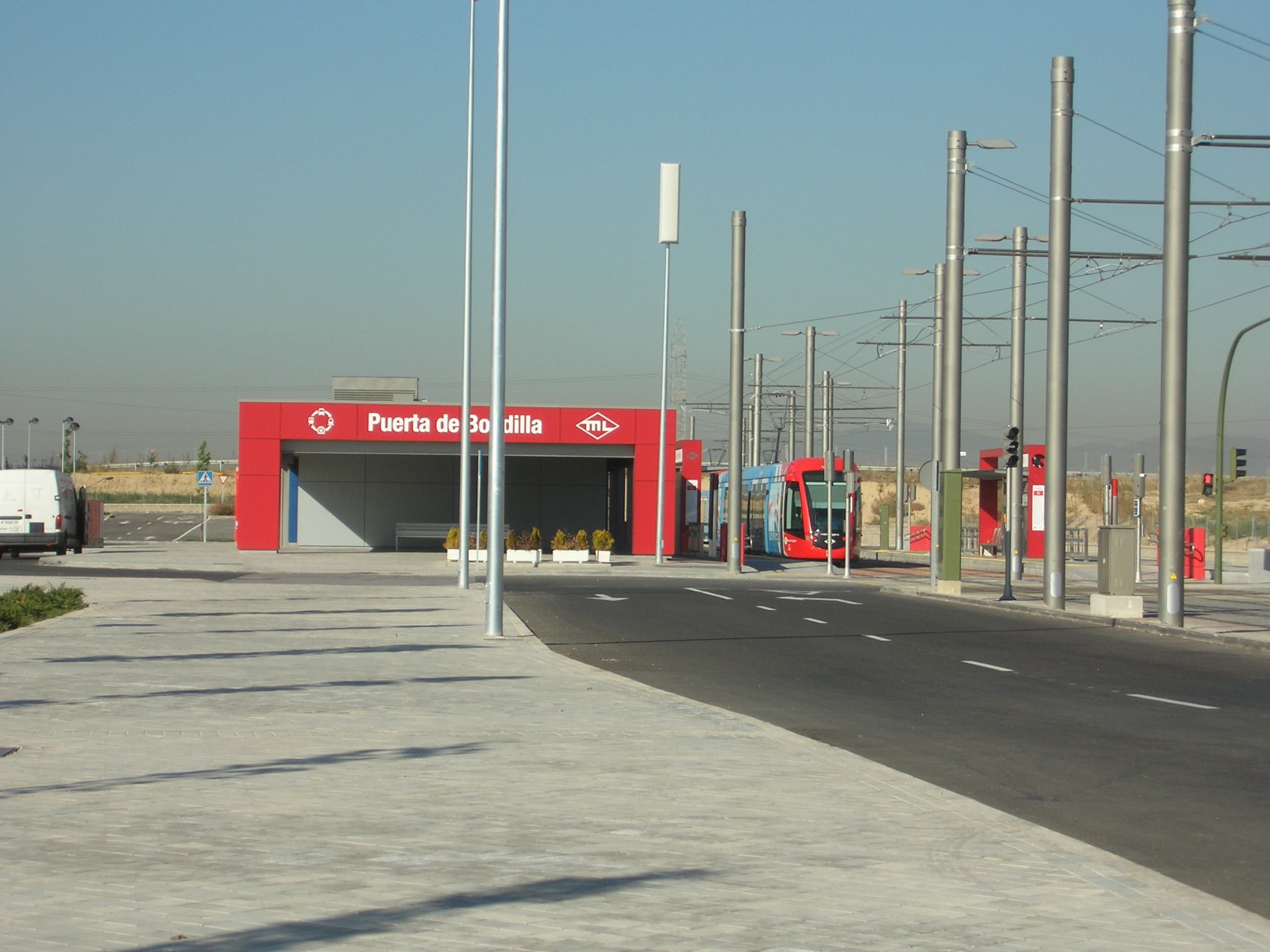
The tram station

== Bibliografía ==
- Montero Padilla, José (2007). Ayuntamiento de Boadilla del Monte (ed.). Historia de Boadilla del Monte (PDF).

Content in this edit is translated from the existing Spanish Wikipedia article at es:Boadilla del Monte; see its history for attribution.
