= Convent of las Madres Carmelitas =

Convent in Madrid, Spain

Convento de las Madres Carmelitas
- Convent of las Madres Carmelitas (Spanish)
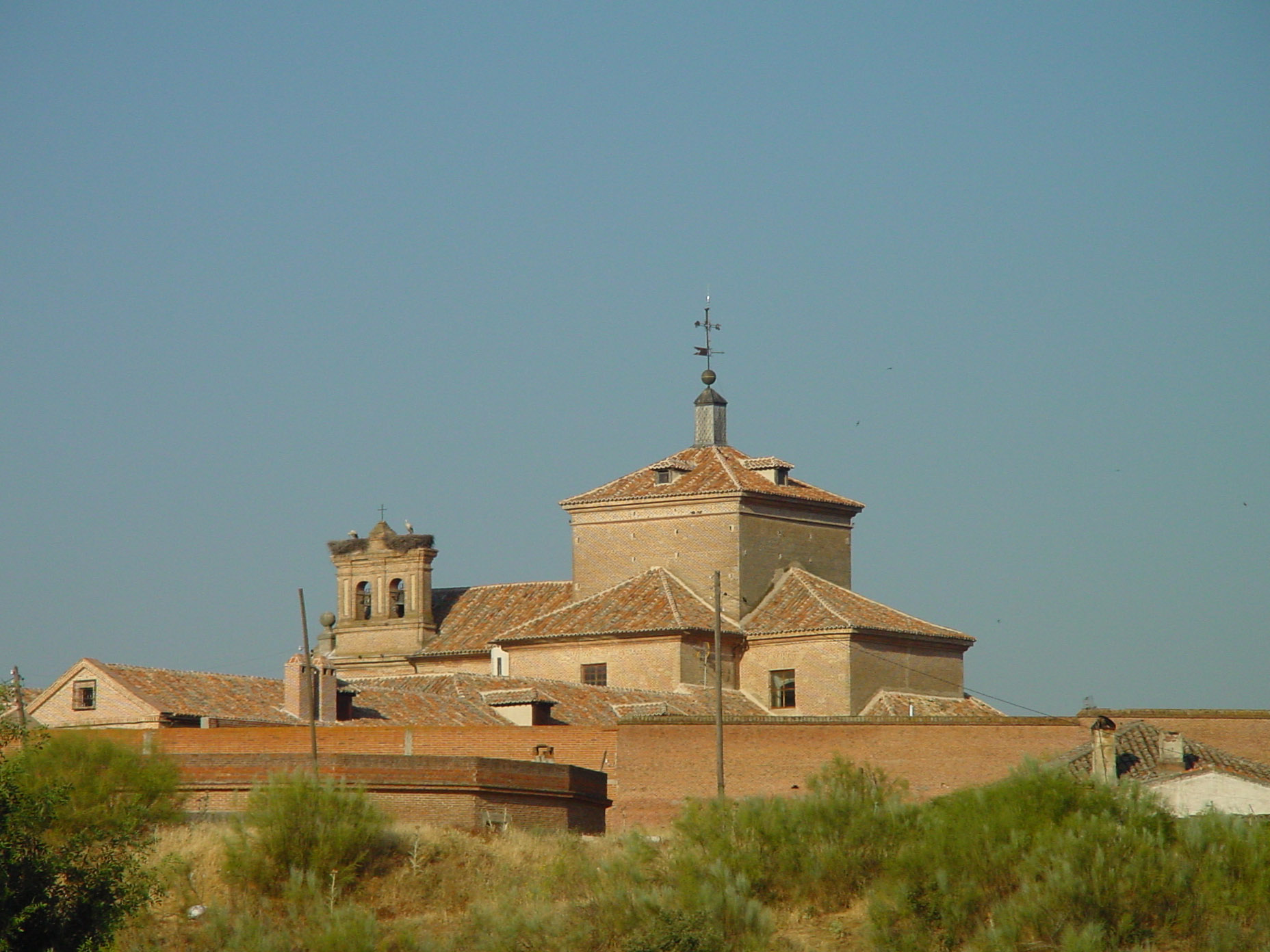

- Location within Spain
- 40.407768°N 3.875841°W
- Location: Boadilla del Monte, Spain

Spanish Cultural Heritage
- Official name: Convento de las Madres Carmelitas
- Type: Non-movable
- Criteria: Monument
- Designated: 1974
- Reference no.: RI-51-0003951

The Convent of las Madres Carmelitas (Spanish: Convento de las Madres Carmelitas) is a convent located in Boadilla del Monte, Spain. It was declared Bien de Interés Cultural in 1974.
