= Palace of the Dukes of Alba =

Cultural property in Piedrahíta, Spain

Coordinates: 40.461402°N 5.325820°W

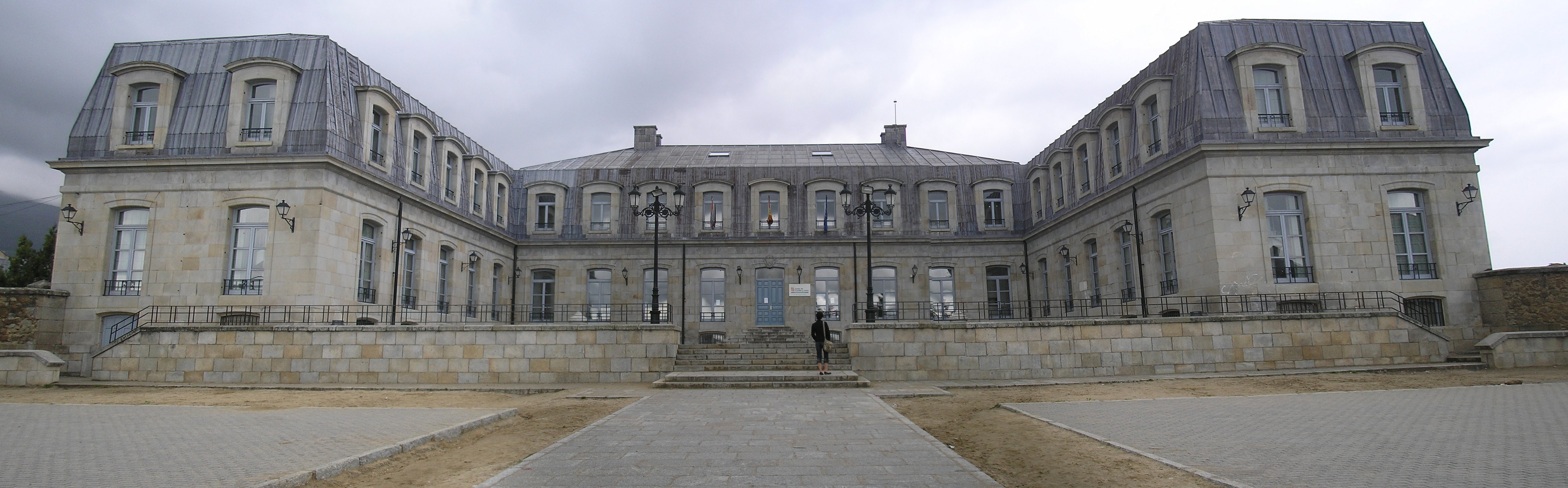
The courtyard of the Ducal Palace

The Palace of the Dukes of Alba (Spanish: Palacio de los duques de Alba) is a ducal palace in Piedrahita, province of Ávila, Spain. The palace was constructed by Jaime Marquet between 1755 and 1766 as a summer residence for the Dukes of Alba, and currently houses a school.

== History ==
Where once was a medieval castle belonging to the Álvarez de Toledo family, the French architect Jaime Marquet constructed a palace for Fernando de Silva, 12th Duke of Alba between 1755 and 1766. The duke used the palace as a summer residence. His granddaughter María Cayetana de Silva, 13th Duchess of Alba invited to the palace famous visitors such as the painter Francisco Goya The palace suffered damage during the Napoleonic wars and the Spanish Civil War. The interior was burned down and looted, however, the exterior remained without alterations. The city council of Piedrahita bought the palace in 1931. It was declared a monument in 1993. the palace now houses a school and the gardens are a public park.

== Architecture ==
The palace is constructed in neoclassical style and is inspired by French examples such as the famous Palace of Versailles. French contemporary architecture was well known to the 12th duke, who was ambassador of Spain in France during the 1750s. Adjacent to the palace was a garden in French style.

== Bibliography ==
- Moreno Blanco, Raimundo (2011) ‘Jacques Marquet y la construccion del palacio de los Duques de Alba en Piedrahíta (Ávila)’. Academia (Madrid: Real Academia de Bellas Artes de San Fernando) (112-113): 87-113. ISSN 0567-560X This article presents detailed research about the construction of the palace.
