= Palace of Infante don Luis =

Building in Boadilla del Monte

- Palacio del Infante don Luis (Spanish)
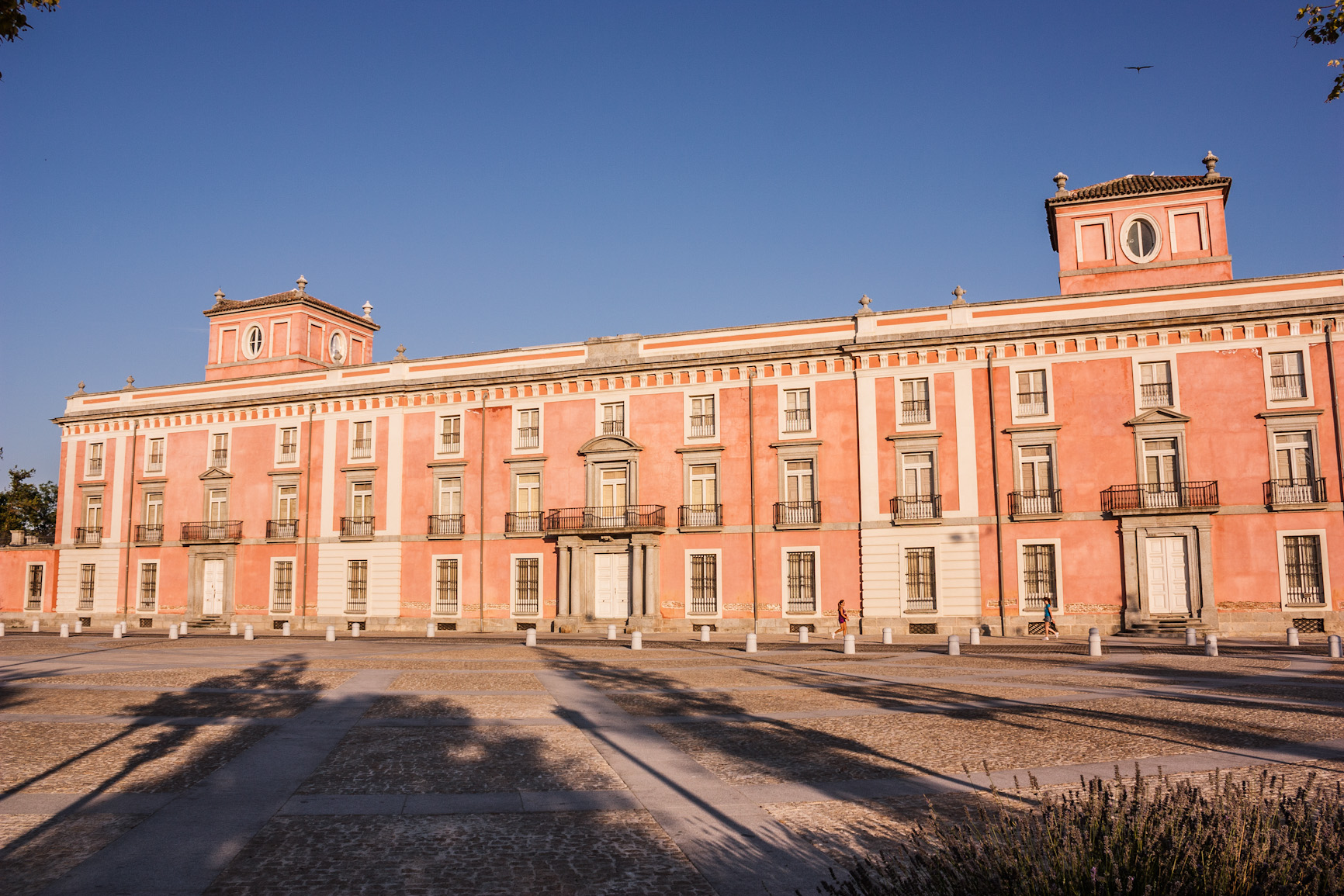
- Interactive map of Palace of Infante don Luis
- 40.4070°N 3.8742°W
- Location: Boadilla del Monte, Spain

Site notes
- Architect: Ventura Rodriguez

Spanish Cultural Heritage
- Official name: Palacio del Infante don Luis
- Type: Non-movable
- Criteria: Monument
- Designated: 1974
- Reference no.: RI-51-0003950

The Palace of Infante don Luis (Spanish: Palacio del Infante don Luis) is a neoclassic style palace located in Boadilla del Monte, Community of Madrid, Spain built between 1763 and 1765. It was declared Bien de Interés Cultural in 1974.

== History ==
The building responds to an initiative of the Infante Luis of Spain, the youngest of the sons of King Felipe V and brother of Carlos III, who took over the lordship of Boadilla in 1761, taking advantage of the economic difficulties he was going through. Josefa Micaela de Mirabal, 3rd Marquise of Mirabal, to whom the area was assigned.

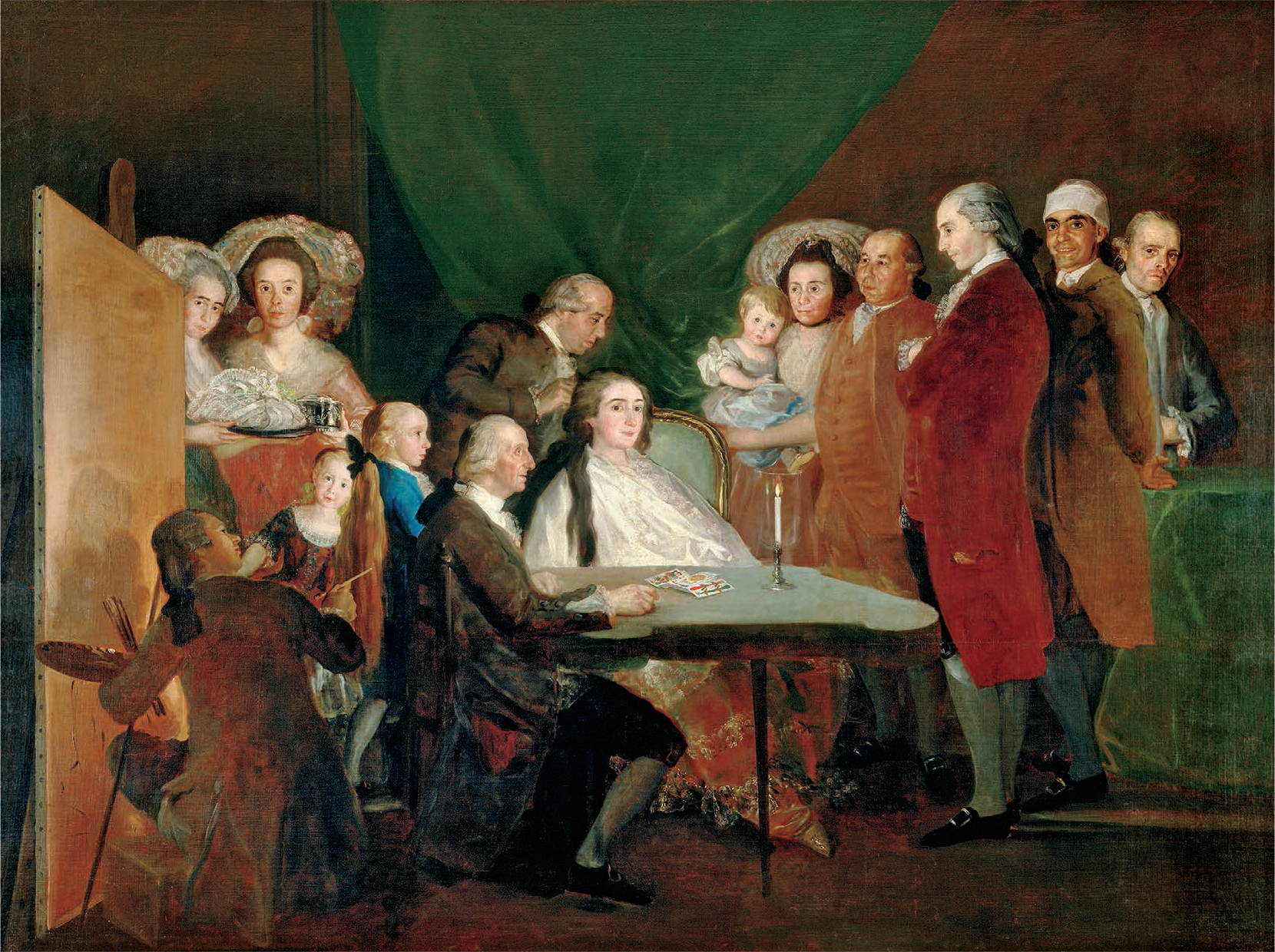
The family of Infante Don Luis (Goya)

The current palace stands on the former palace of the Two Towers, residence of the aforementioned marquisate, which was integrated into the structure from a design by Ventura Rodríguez made in 1763. The works were executed at a very rapid pace, leaving the building practically completed in 1765, as it appears on a tombstone commemorating the end of construction, placed on the main façade.

The palace was the main residence of the Infante Don Luis from 1765 to 1776, the year of his morganatic marriage with María Teresa de Vallabriga, after which he moved to the Palacio de la Mosquera, in Arenas de San Pedro. Among its inhabitants was the musician Luigi Boccherini, who was under the protection of the infante during his stay in Spain. During the following years the palace belonged to his descendants the Dukes of Alcudia and Sueca.

During the Spanish Civil War (1936-1939) the construction suffered considerable damage, in addition to the loss of numerous works of art. In 1974 it was declared a National Monument, being expropriated in 1998 to the last owner, Enrique Jaime Ruspoli Morenés, 19th Count of Bañares son of the Dukes, by the City Council of Boadilla del Monte, who had planned to install in its dependencies the headquarters of the European Institute of Higher Studies of Culture and Communication.

== Description ==
=== Exterior ===
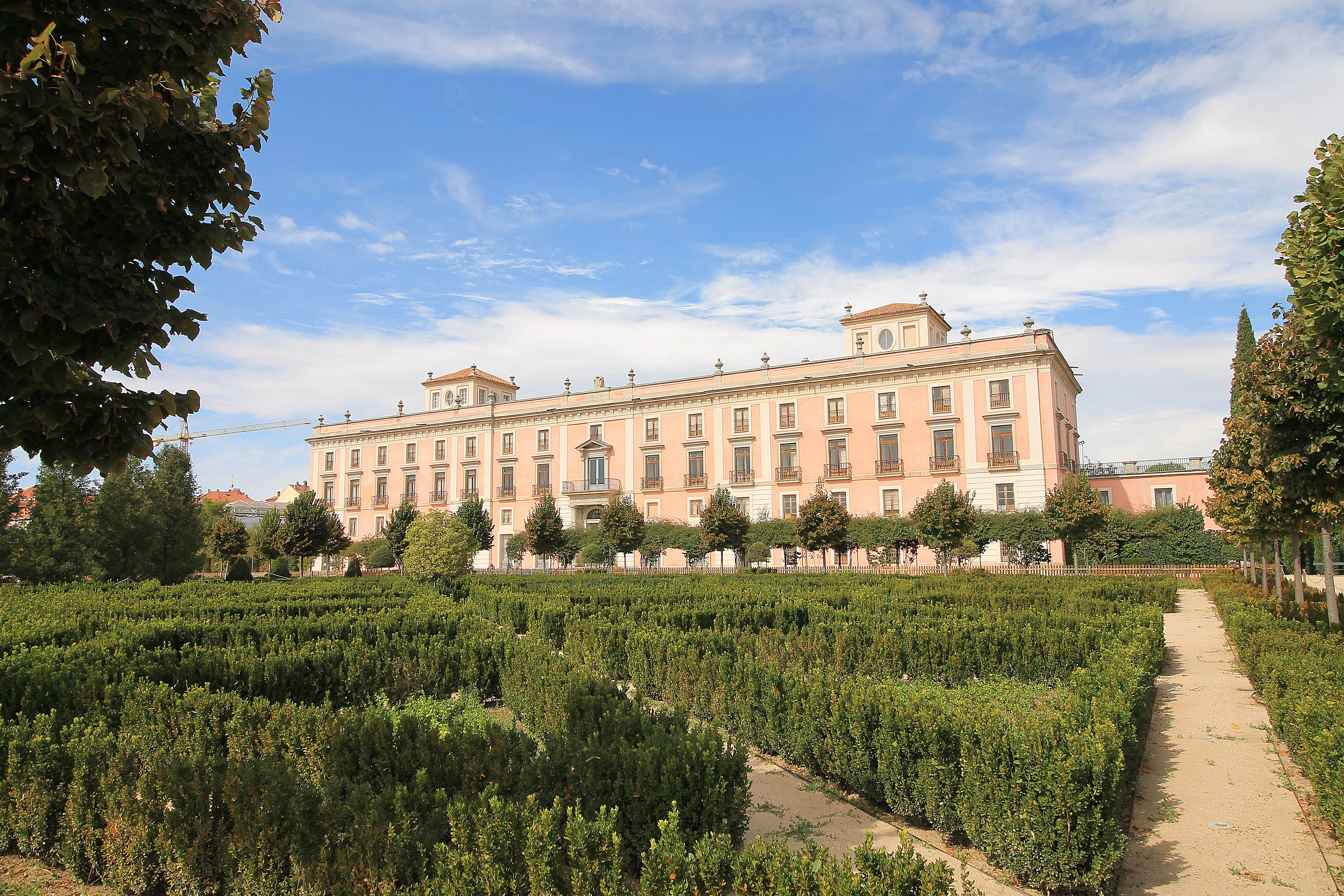
South-east façade and gardens

The palace has an elongated rectangular floor plan (17 x 80 m approximately) with the main entrance façade facing the Northwest and the rear façade facing the south-east facing garden. It has a built area of 6,302.15 m^{2}. It is articulated in three main bodies, raised to three heights, to which are added two secondary bodies, of a single height, flanking the two sides.

The materials used in the construction are, for the most part, red brick and, in the background, stone, reserved for the doorways, the pediments and the socket, the latter of ashlar is granite. The roofs are made in Arabic tiles.

The whole is crowned by two small towers located at the ends, on the roofs, which emulate the layout of the original Palace of the Two Towers, on which the current building was erected. They are quadrangular and serve as light bodies, although they have oval vanes that break the linearity of the general layout.

The two main facades are projected without relief, except for the covers, the pediments, and the cornice that tops the building, on which appears a parapet that hides the roof. These two facades, which have very similar layouts, are the northern, which serves as access, and the southern, which overlooks the gardens.

The central cover is framed with Tuscan columns. Above it rise a balcony with columns Ionic, a semicircular pediment and, above it, a commemorative tombstone, with the inscription "A.D. MDCCLXV", in allusion to the year in which the palace was finished. The remaining covers, located on the sides, are also presided by balconies with pediments, although triangular.

Ornamental elements are scarce on the outside. These are practically limited to the upper part, adorned with different vases and two coats of arms (corresponding to the king Felipe V of Spain), in white stone of Colmenar de Oreja.

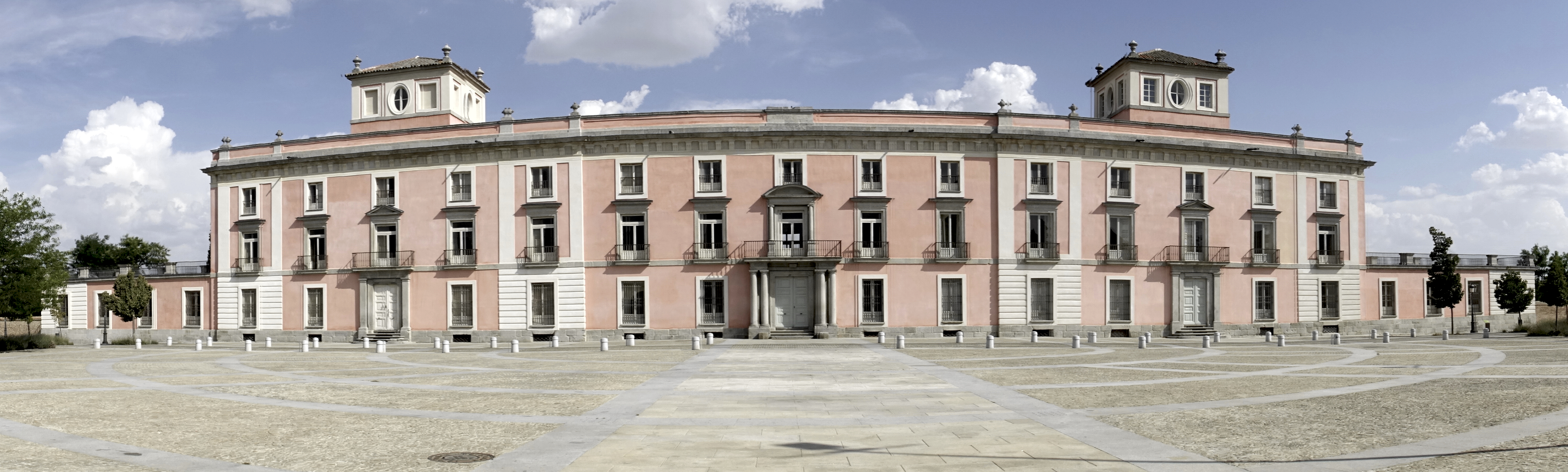
Main façade panorama

=== Interior ===
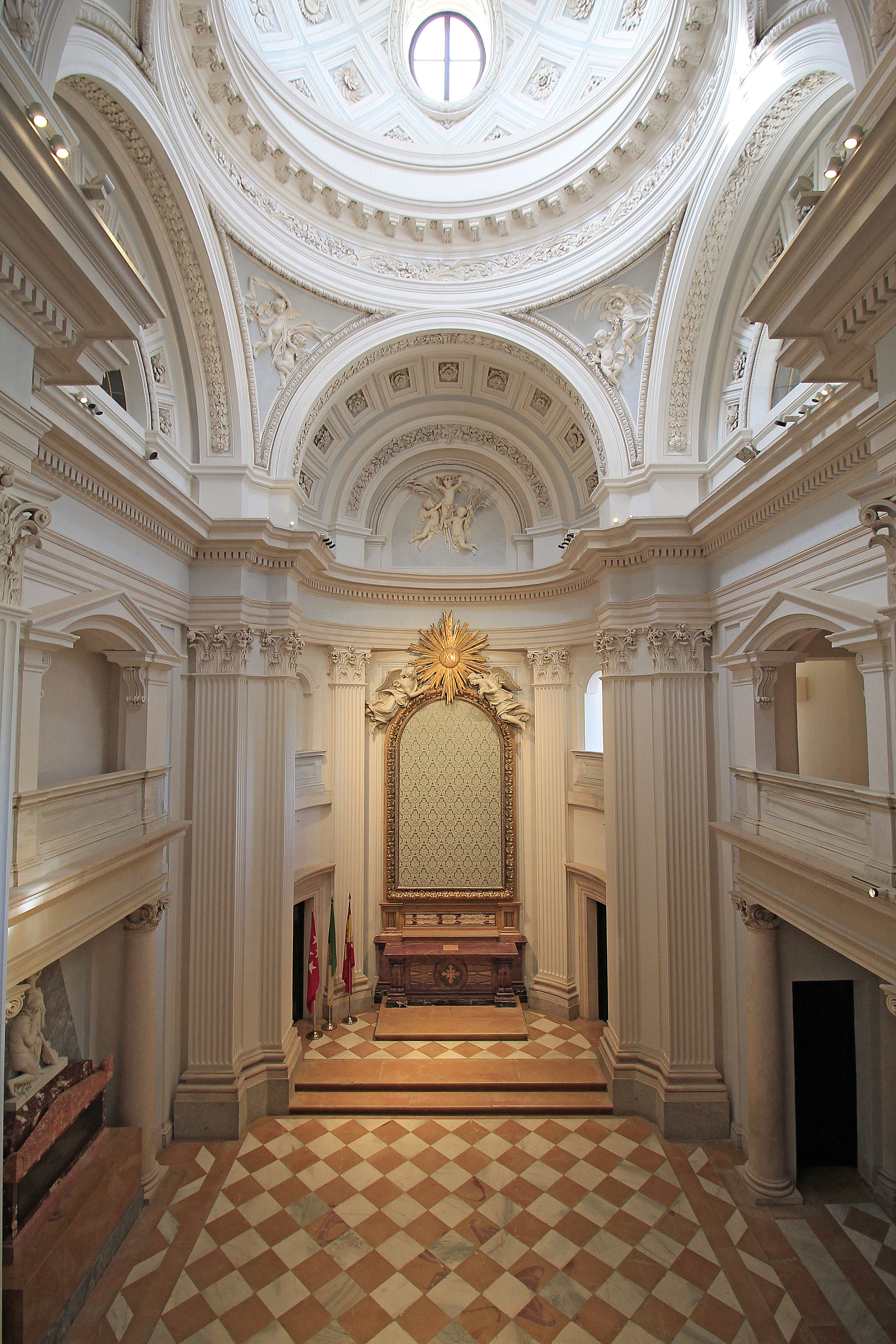
Chapel

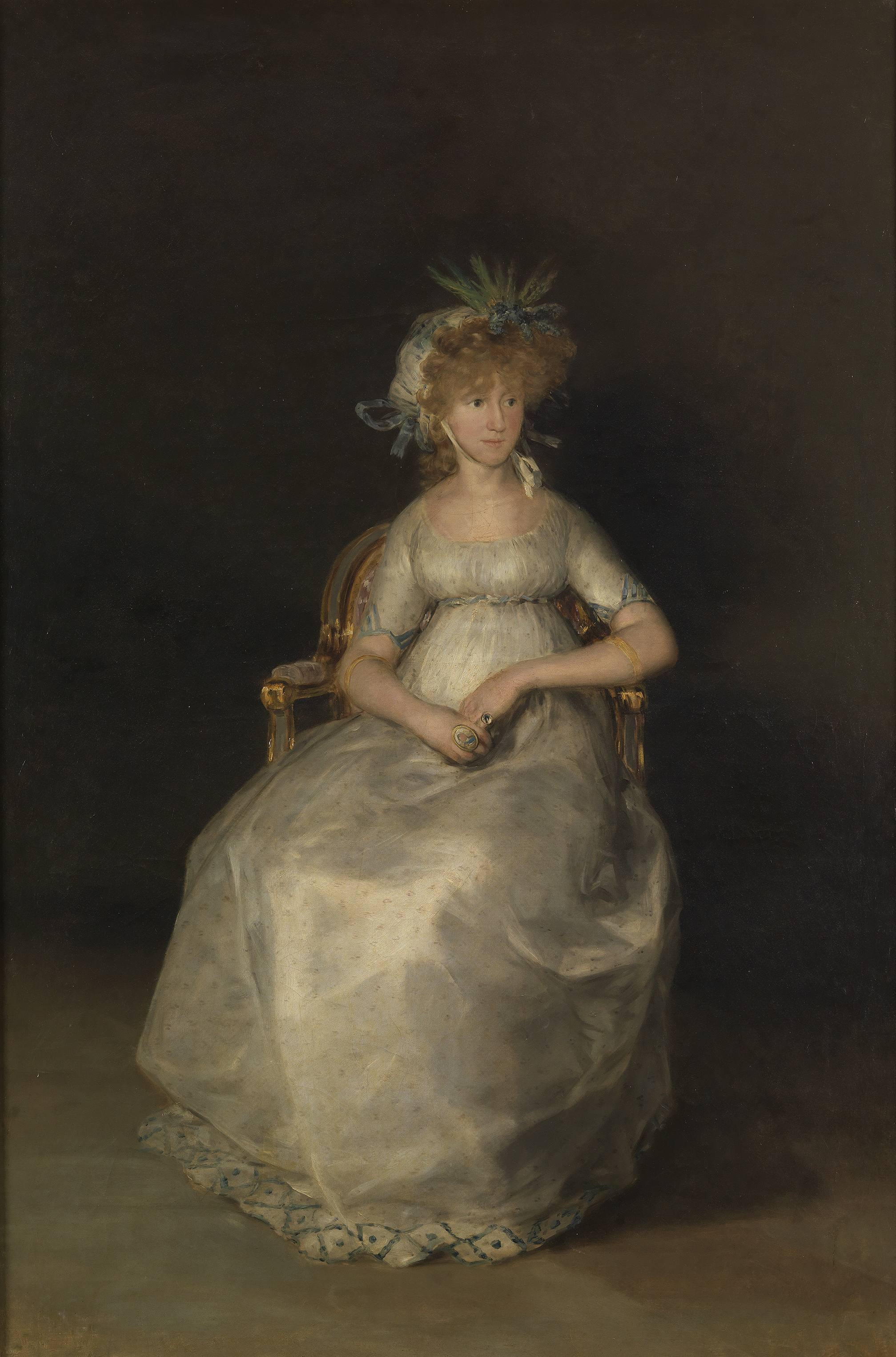
Maria Teresa de Borbón y Valabriga, 15th Countess of Chinchón, painted by Francisco de Goya

Unlike the severe layout of the exterior, the interior is notable for its sumptuousness, especially visible in the chapel. The recurrent use of Corinthians motifs, the use of materials such as marble, bronze or stucco, and the presence of decorative elements such as garlands, angels, grapes, and flowers in the arches, pendentives, cornices, and vaults account for the ornamental profusion of this dependence.

In the chapel are the pantheons of María Teresa de Borbón and Vallabriga, XV Countess of Chinchón, second daughter of Luis Antonio de Borbón and wife of Manuel Godoy; and María Luisa de Borbón y Vallabriga, duchess consort of San Fernando de Quiroga, among other historical personalities.

The palace housed an important collection of works of art, from the Dukes of Alcudia and Sueca among which were pictures of Goya, Rembrandt, Murillo, Velázquez and Dürer, among other artists.

=== Landscape and Grounds ===
The palace was built on a plot of 71,469.46 m^{2}, within a landscaped complex of regular layout that, given the unevenness of the land, is arranged in terraces, which are accessed through stairways. To this is added the existence of a garden and a wild park, which extend the garden area through an integrating concept of palatial and rural architecture.

The gardens respond to a design with clear Italian influence. They extend to the foot of the southern facade of the palace and are distributed in two well-differentiated areas, the high garden and the low garden, separated by two galleries.

Both had numerous ornamental elements, including three caves, a pond, a stone bridge and a Ferris wheel, which are still preserved, as well as the Fuente de las Conchas, designed by Ventura Rodríguez and sculpted by Francisco Gutiérrez Arribas and Manuel Álvarez el Griego , and located next to the rear facade of the Palatial residence until the beginning of the 19th century, when the heirs of the infant, Dukes of San Fernando de Quiroga, decided to give it to Ferdinand VII and his wife María Cristina, being installed in the Real Quinta de Vista Alegre. In 1845, this sculptural group was moved to the Campo del Moro, next to the Palacio Real de Madrid, where it is currently exhibited.

In the vicinity of the northern (main) façade of the palace, forming an axis with its access door, there is a fountain (called [Ventura Rodríguez Fountain (Boadilla del Monte) | by Ventura Rodríguez, or the Tres Caños] ]) also designed by Ventura Rodríguez, formed by three niches and pilasters of Tuscany. It presided over a landscaped enclosure, that disappeared with the urban expansion of Boadilla del Monte, extending on its lot at the moment a street and a square.

The enclosure is surrounded by walls and walls of lime and bare brick, on which rests a balustrade of white stone of Colmenar de Oreja. The access is made through four neoclassical doors, made in brick and topped with triangular pediments, which are very deteriorated.
