= Faronne Ollivier =

French artist (1716–after 1762)

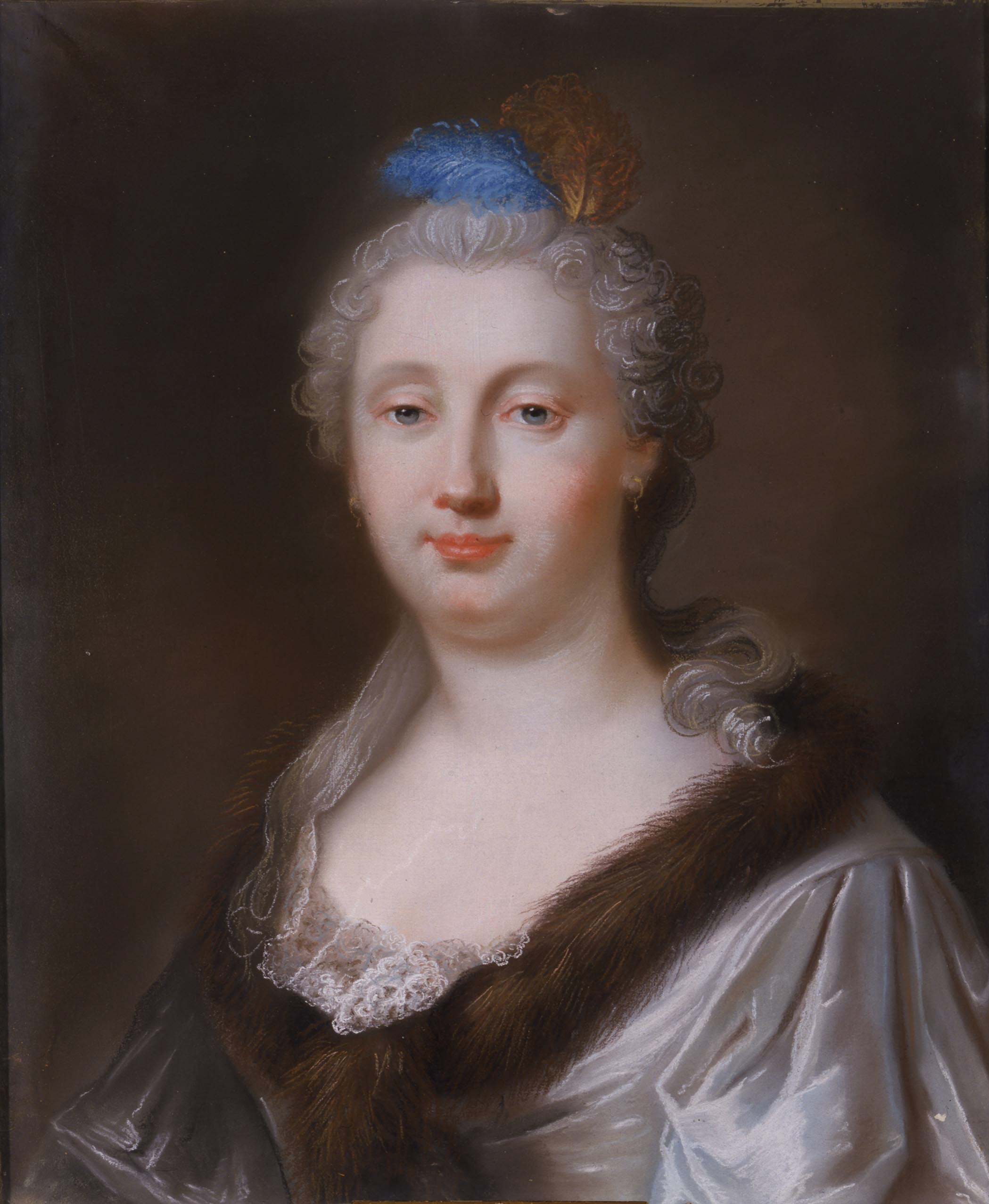
Self-Portrait, in the collection of the Real Academia de Bellas Artes de San Fernando

Faronne-Marie-Madaleine Ollivier, née Lefebvre (1716 – after 1762) was a French pastellist active in Spain.

Ollivier's biography has been the subject of much confusion over the years. Some sources state that she was the daughter of Italian sculptor Giovan Domenico Olivieri and was married to architect Jacques Marquet, but this is incorrect. She was, instead, born in Paris, the daughter of the bourgeois Jean Lefebvre; she married painter Michel-Barthélémy Ollivier in 1750. He had earlier followed Louis-Michel Van Loo to Spain, and the couple returned to that country to settle. Faronne Ollivier wrote to the Real Academia de Bellas Artes de San Fernando in 1759, asking to be admitted as a member. Her application was accepted unanimously, making her the first woman to be elected not only to the Academia but indeed to any académica de mérito; several other pastellists and female artists followed suit. Ollivier's technique indicates a knowledge of the work of Rosalba Carriera. No work after 1759 is known, and it is unclear if she was alive at her husband's death in 1784.
