= Convento de San Norberto =

Former convent in Madrid, Spain

Coordinates: 40.4231°N 3.7089°W

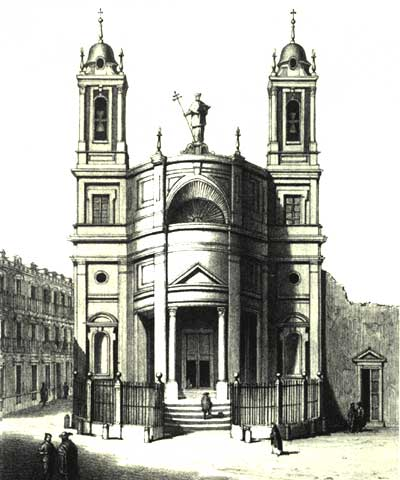
Convento de San Norberto. Engraving of 1861.

The Convento de Premonstratenses de San Norberto, also known as Convento de Mostenses or Convento de San Norberto, named after the founder of the Premonstratensian Order, is a religious building that disappeared. It was located on the ground of the current Plaza de Los Mostenses, next to the Gran Vía of Madrid (Spain). It was founded in 1611 by the community of the Fathers Canons Premonstratensians with the permission of Cardinal Archbishop of Toledo Bernardo de Rojas and financed by a benefactor, the Count of Miranda, Juan of Zúñiga, the then president of the Council of Castile. Today the site of the convent is occupied by a market built in the 19th century, known as Mercado de Los Mostenses.

== History ==
The church had been rebuilt in 1754 by architect Ventura Rodríguez, having been previously ruined. It had a convex façade flanked by two towers but was a victim of the plan of the then king, Joseph Bonaparte to open up the plazas of the city. First, the convent was demolished in April 1810, in the next month, an order was issued to demolish the church. However, the architects who were commissioned to direct this operation, Silvestre Pérez (royal architect) and Juan Antonio Cuervo refused, because of its artistic value and in addition having both been disciples of Ventura Rodríguez. However, their negative reports were of no avail and in 1811 a new royal order finished by tearing down what that left of the building.

In 1875, the Former Mercado de Los Mostenses, designed by Mariano Calvo Pereira, and notable for its use of iron, was inaugurated on its site and twin to the Former Mercado de la Cebada, although somewhat smaller. In turn, this new building was demolished in 1925 to make way for the Gran Vía after a realignment of the route, placing the current market further north, and locating offices and housing buildings on the original site.

== Description ==
The convent was originally built in the then Calle de la Inquisición, occupying another convent-church which led the nuns of St. Catherine of Siena to move to another building on the Plaza de las Cortes de Madrid.

Besides the work of Ventura Rodríguez, there were architectural features left from the earlier church, with the main façade composed of a semicircular portico flanked by two towers decorated with Corinthian columns. The portico had three entrances with four Ionic columns and on this, rose a second crowned body with a statue of St. Norbert, made of granite from Colmenar Viejo by sculptor Manuel Álvarez.

In the book Historia de la Villa y Corte de Madrid, by José Amador de Los Ríos and Juan de Dios de la Rada, has an engraving that depicts the convent.
