= Church of San Marcos (Madrid) =

- Iglesia de San Marcos (Spanish)
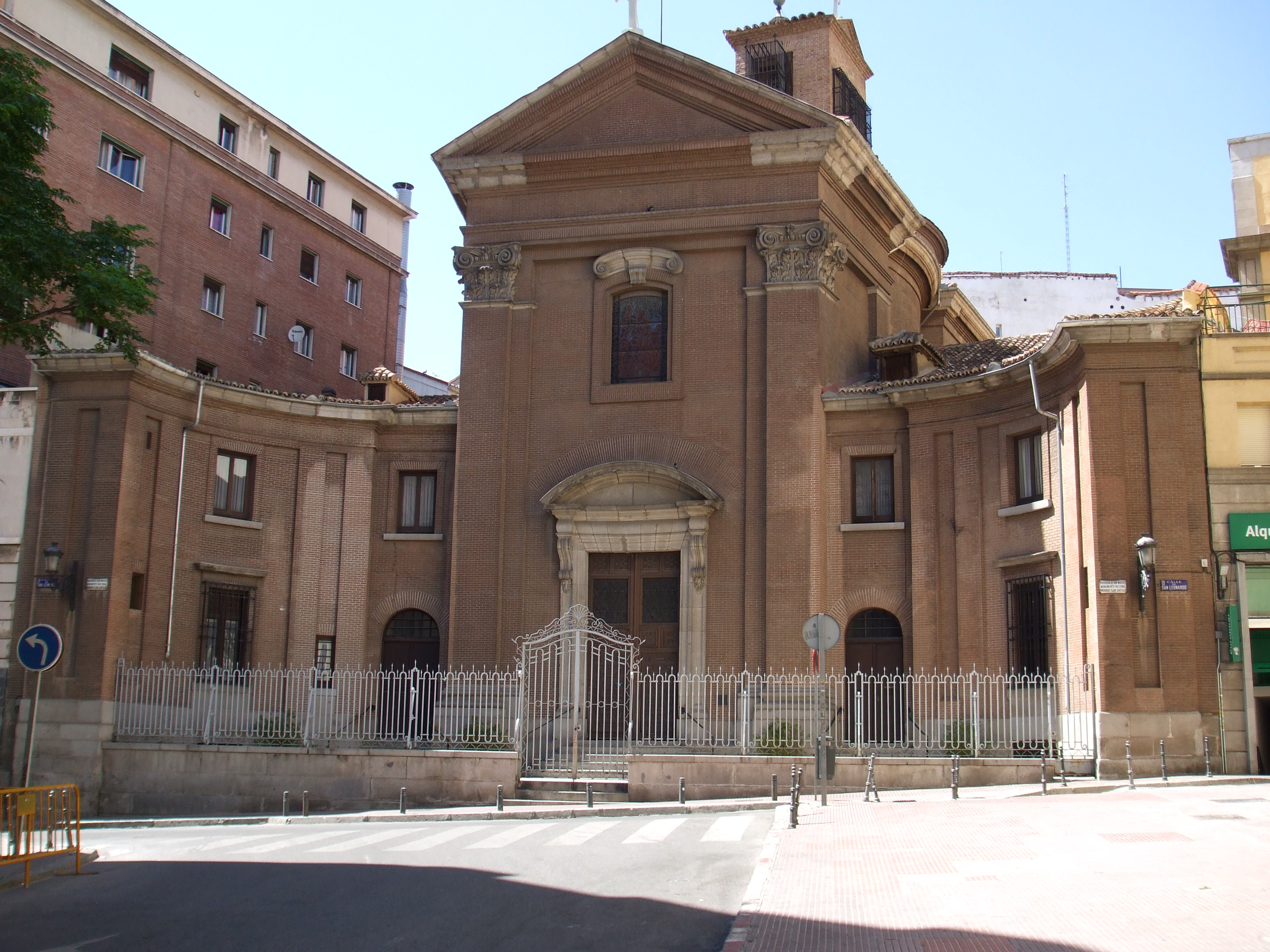

- Location within Spain
- 40.42483°N 3.711185°W
- Location: Madrid, Spain

Site notes
- Architect: Ventura Rodríguez
- Architectural style: Neoclassical

Spanish Cultural Heritage
- Official name: Iglesia de San Marcos
- Type: Non-movable
- Criteria: Monument
- Designated: 1944
- Reference no.: RI-51-0001160

The Church of San Marcos (Spanish: Iglesia de San Marcos) is a parish church located in Madrid, Spain. It was designed by Ventura Rodríguez, and it is one of a number of surviving buildings by this architect in the city.

== Conservation ==
It was declared Bien de Interés Cultural in 1944.

== See also ==
- Catholic Church in Spain
- List of oldest church buildings
