= Royal House of the Post Office =

Headquarters of the Region of Madrid

Coordinates: 40.4164°N 3.7038°W

- Real Casa de Correos
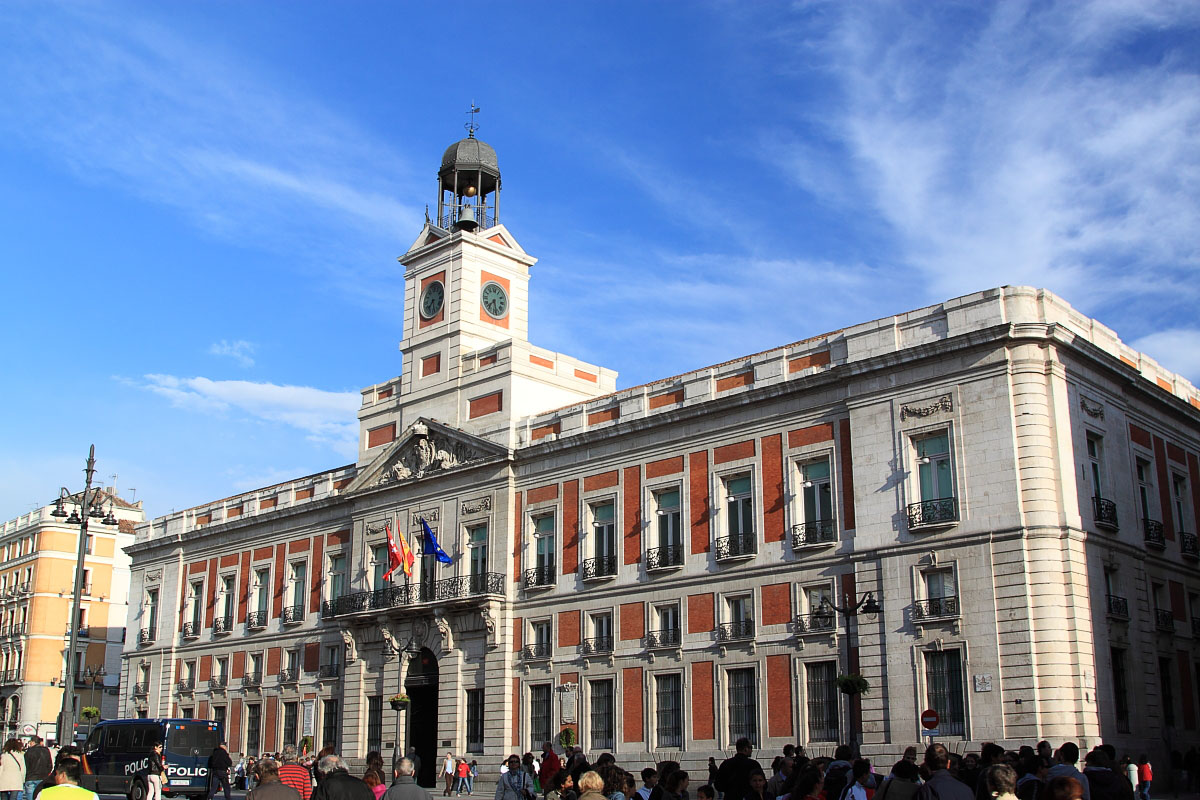
- Interactive map of the Royal House of the Post Office area

General information
- Location: Puerta del Sol 7, Madrid, Spain
- Completed: 1768

Design and construction
- Architect: Jaime Marquet

The Royal House of the Post Office (Spanish: Real Casa de Correos) is an eighteenth-century building in Puerta del Sol, Madrid. It was built for the postal service, but currently serves as the office of the President of the Community of Madrid, the head of the regional government of the Autonomous Community of Madrid. This should not be confused with the City Council of Madrid, which is housed in another former post office, the Cybele Palace.

== History ==
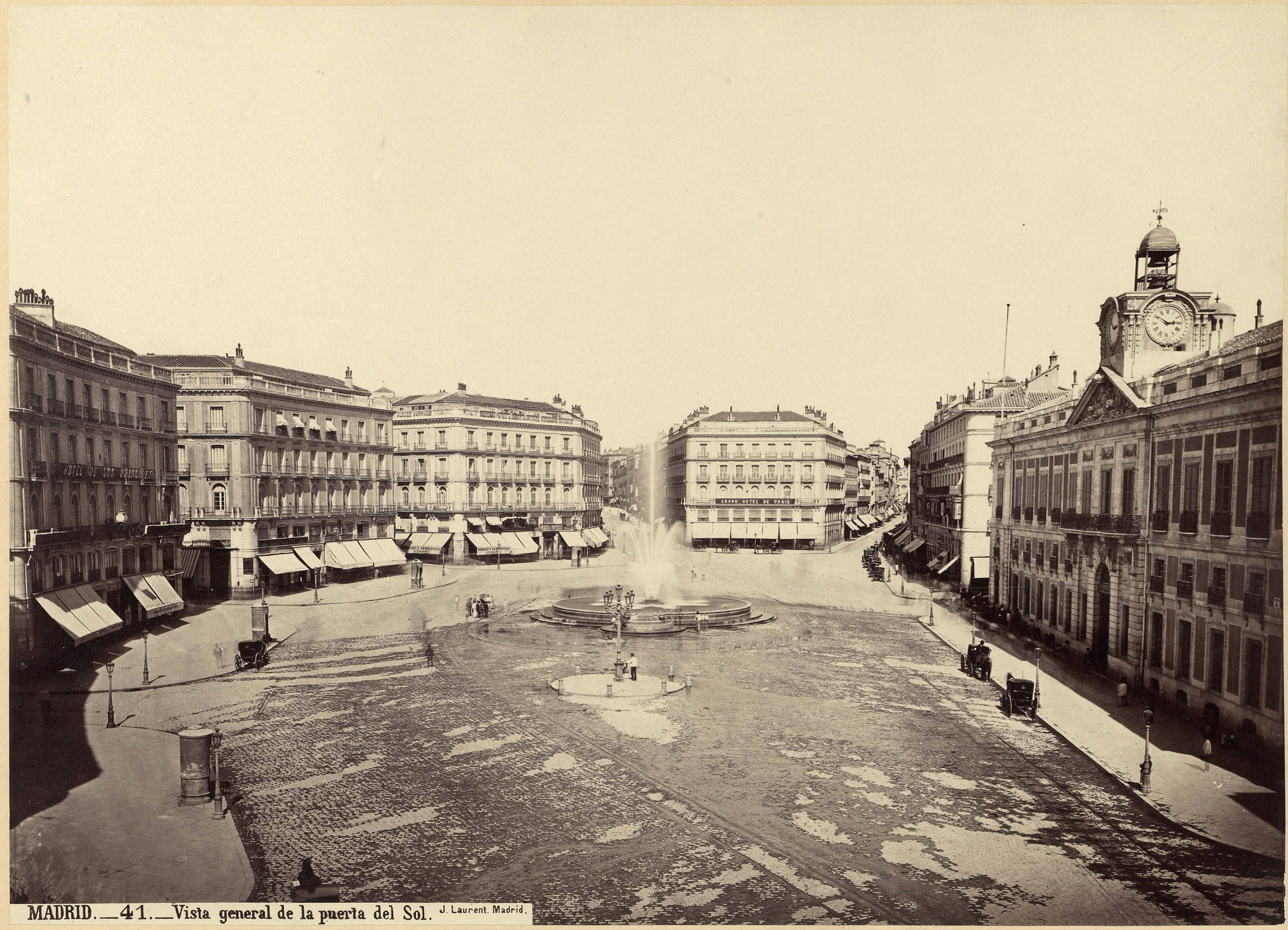
On the right you can see the Edificio de Gobernación (as it was called in the 19th-century). Photograph by Jean Laurent, 1870.

In the 17th century there were some thirty two-storey houses in the area currently occupied by the Royal House of the Post Office. In the 1750s the area was cleared as part of the development of the Puerta del Sol square. A plan for a head post office was produced by the Spanish architect Ventura Rodríguez. However, Ventura Rodríguez, who enjoyed the patronage of Ferdinand VI, lost favour when Charles III came to the throne in 1760. The House of the Post Office was designed by French architect Jacques Marquet. Work on the building began in the late 1760s.

For a time, a tower on the roof was the terminal of one of the optical telegraphy lines of Spain.

The building was the headquarters of the Ministry of Interior and State Security in Francoist Spain. The basement of the DGS (Spanish: Dirección General de Seguridad, lit. 'Directorate-General for Security') was infamous for being a place where dissidents to the regime were subjected to torture.

== Clock tower ==
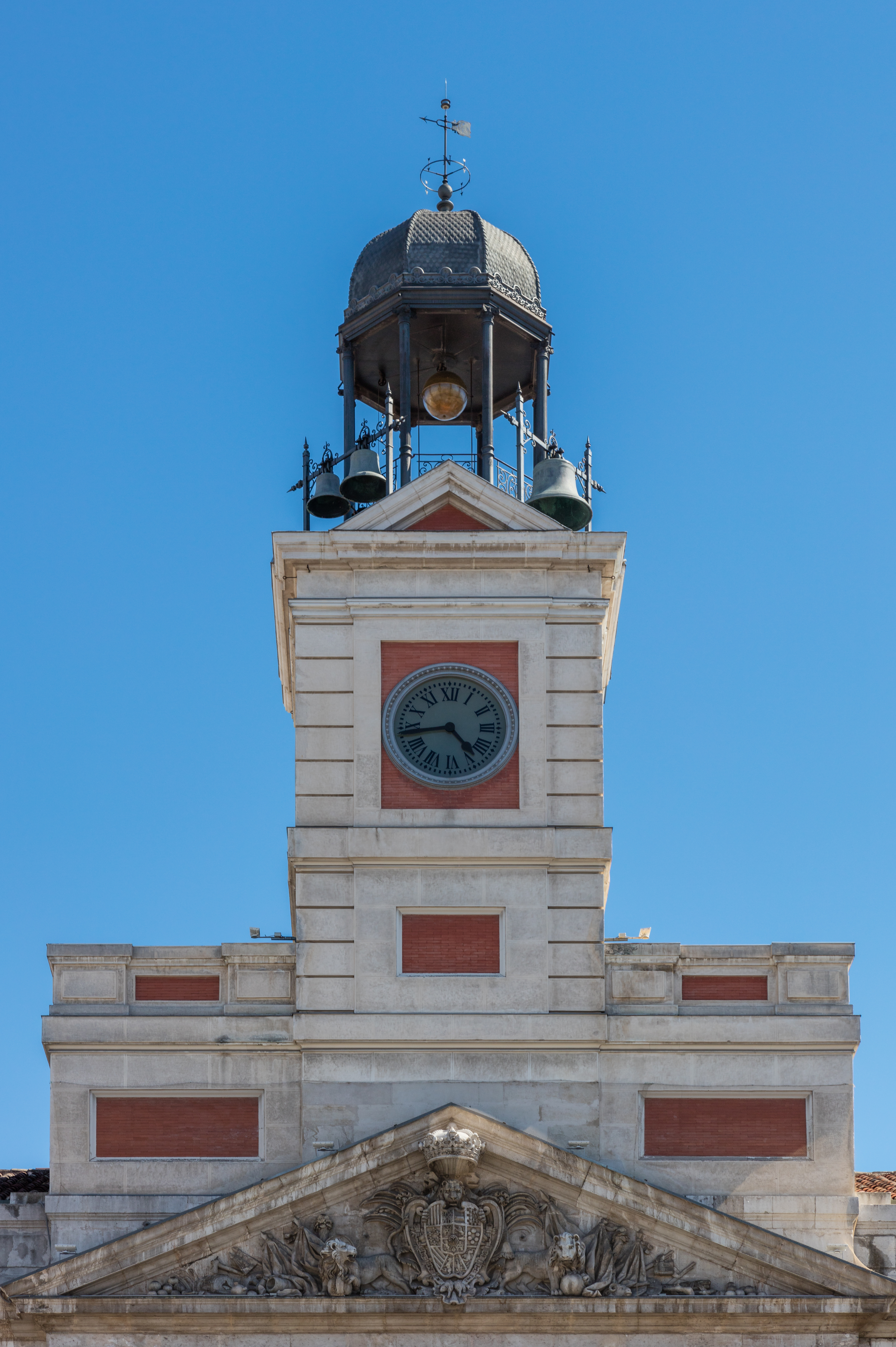
Detail of the clock tower.

On top of the building is a clock inaugurated in 1866 by Queen Isabel II. Its time ball and bells traditionally mark the eating of the Twelve Grapes and the beginning of a new year in most of Spain (the Canary Islands are in a different time zone). The change of year is broadcast from there on all major Spanish national television networks and radio stations, with television broadcasting beginning in 1962 on Televisión Española.

== Km 0 ==
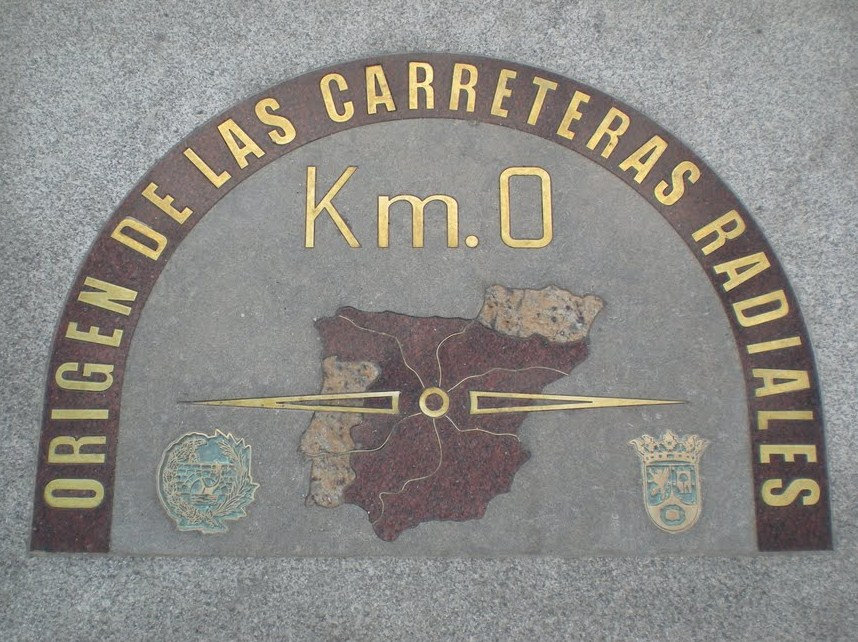
Kilometer Zero mark.

A plate on the ground in front of the building marks the kilometer 0 of the streets of Madrid and the Spanish roads.
