= Piedrahíta =

- municipality
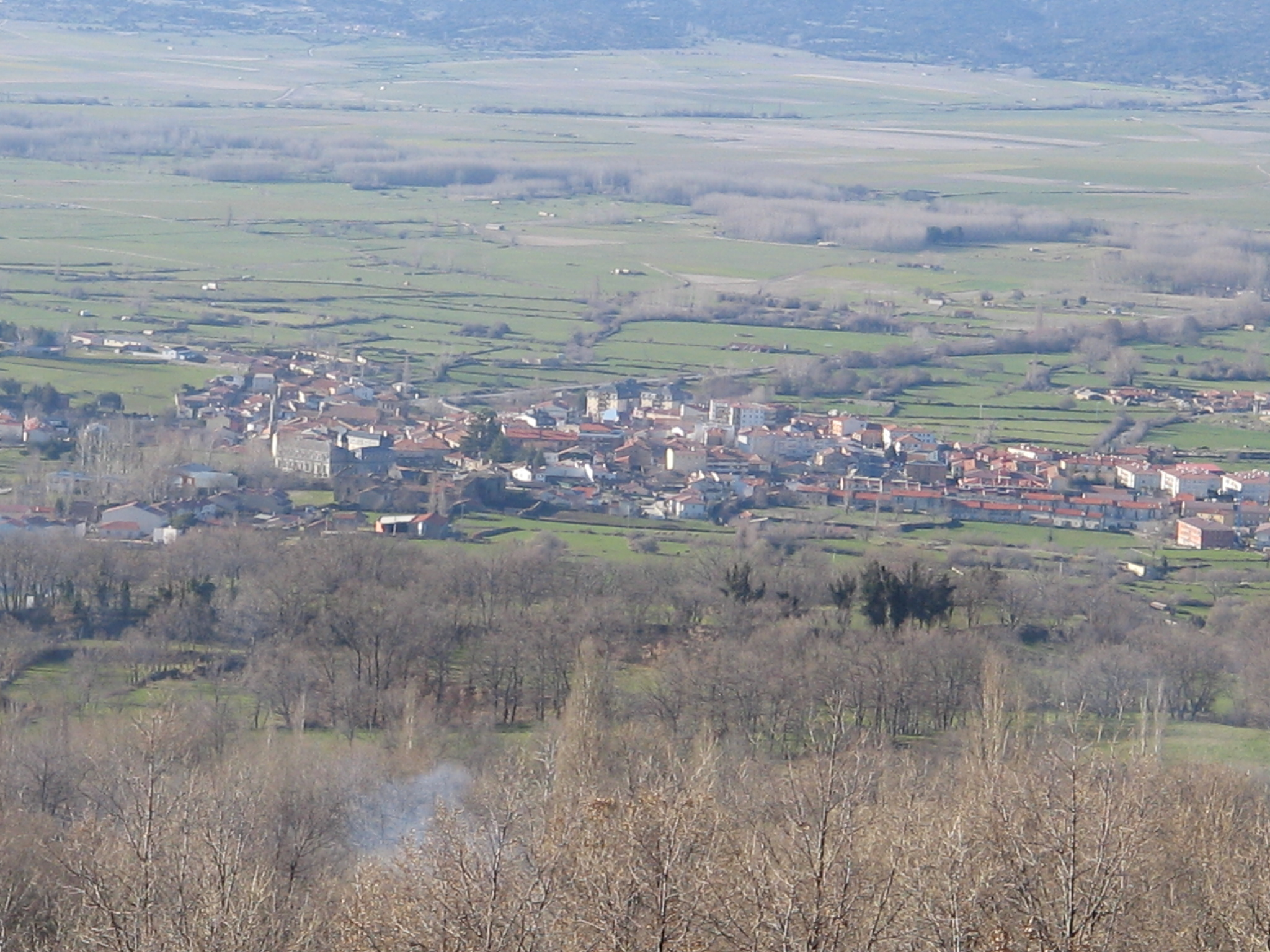

- Flag Coat of arms

- Location in Spain. Piedrahíta (Spain)
- Coordinates: 40°27′49″N 5°19′39″W
- Country: Spain
- Autonomous community: Castile and León
- Province: Ávila
- Municipality: Piedrahita

Area
  - Total: 28 km^{2} (11 sq mi)

Population (2025-01-01)
  - Total: 1,637
  - Density: 58/km^{2} (150/sq mi)
- Time zone: UTC+1 (CET)
  - Summer (DST): UTC+2 (CEST)
- Climate: Csb
- Website: Official website

Piedrahíta is a municipality located in the province of Ávila, Castile and León, Spain. The town is located in the Corneja valley , on the north slope of the Villafranca mountains, flanked to the west by the Jura mountain. It is part of the judicial area of Piedrahíta, and of the El Barco de Ávila-Piedrahíta region.

== Population ==
Historical population
Year	Pop.	±% p.a.
2023	1,662	—
2024	1,637	−1.50%
2025	1,637	+0.00%
Source: INE

== Toponymy ==
Piedrahíta comes from Latin petra ficta, literally "fixed stone". The term designates a stone that serves the role of a boundary marker for a particular property. The toponym is found elsewhere, in Pierrefitte (Argelès-Gazost), Pietrafitta (Avegno, Genoa)

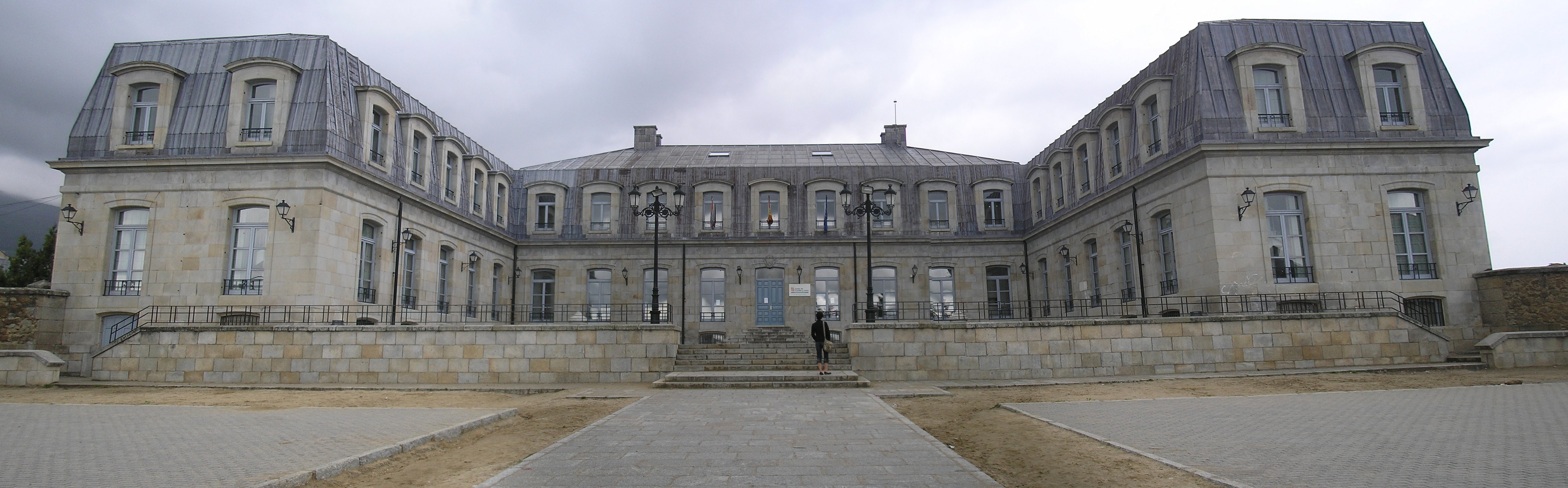
Facade of the Palacio de los duques de Alba, in Piedrahíta, built between 1755 and 1766.
