= Ventura Rodríguez =

Spanish architect and artist

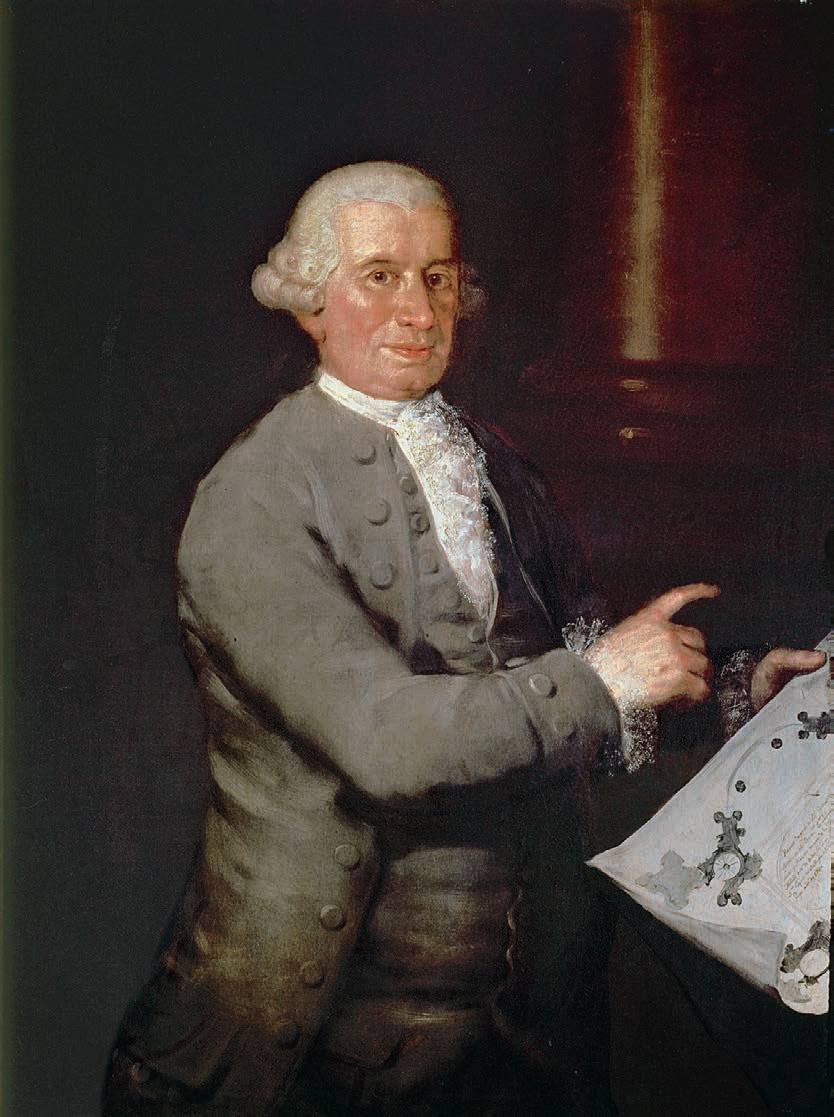
- Ventura Rodríguez by Francisco Goya
- Born: 14 July 1717; Ciempozuelos, Madrid, Spain
- Died: 26 September 1785 (aged 68); Madrid, Spain
- Occupation: Architect
- Buildings: Palace of Infante don Luis (Boadilla del Monte), Pamplona Cathedral, Liria Palace

Ventura Rodríguez Tizón (July 14, 1717 – September 26, 1785) was a Spanish architect and artist. Born at Ciempozuelos, Rodríguez was the son of a bricklayer. In 1727, he collaborated with his father in the work at the Royal Palace of Aranjuez.

== Major works ==
Ventura's career was remarkably prolific. Between 1749 and 1753, he built the church of San Marcos in Madrid. In 1752, he was named the director of architectural studies at the Royal Academy of Fine Arts of San Fernando.

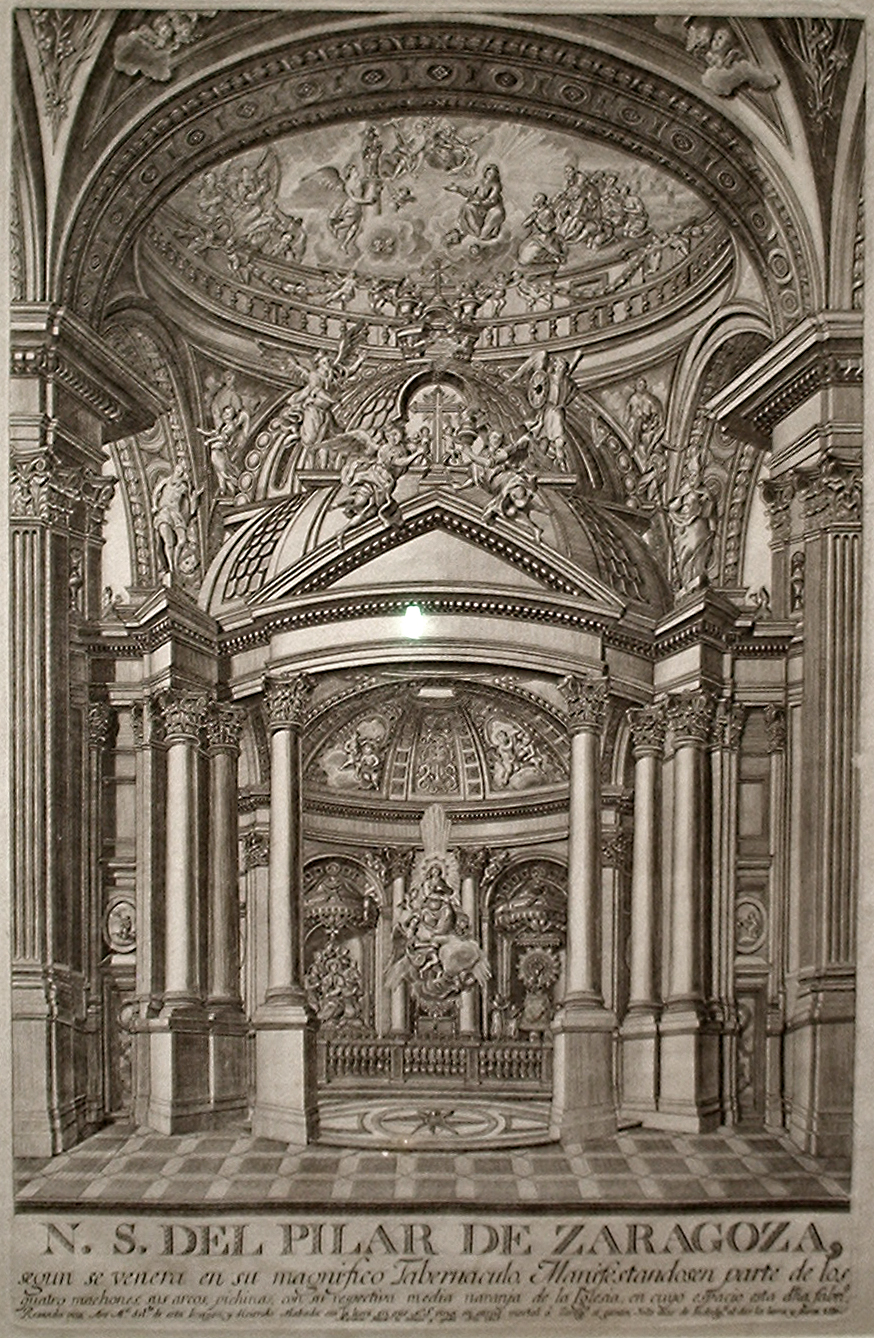
Holy chapel of the Basilica of Our Lady of the Pillar in Zaragoza, built in 1750.

In 1750, he was commissioned with finishing and remodeling the basílica del Pilar of Zaragoza. Earlier plans by Felipe Busiñac, Felipe Sánchez, and Francisco Herrera the Younger had not satisfied the demands of the municipality, a convenient distance from the river and proper alignment with the icon and other buildings. In the cathedral of Cuenca, Ventura was asked to construct a transparente (a glass-roofed altar complex) similar to that made by Narciso Tomé in the Cathedral of Toledo.

Between 1755 and 1767, he decorated the interior of the church of the Royal Monastery of la Encarnación, in Madrid. Then at his peak of influence, the Bourbon monarchs of Spain, Fernando VI and Carlos III began to favor foreign architects such as the French Jacques Marquet and the Neapolitan Francesco Sabatini (nephew of Luigi Vanvitelli).

However, ensconced in 1766 in a role similar to buildings commissioner for the Council of Castile, Rodríguez played a role in many works. Buildings or renovations needing official approval came to his purview, and often underwent his scrutiny and change. He aided in the design of the Convent of the Philippine Augustines of Valladolid, the college of surgery in Barcelona (1761, home today of the academy of Medicine), the town hall of Haro (1769), and his projects for a new National library and the factory of glass at La Granja.

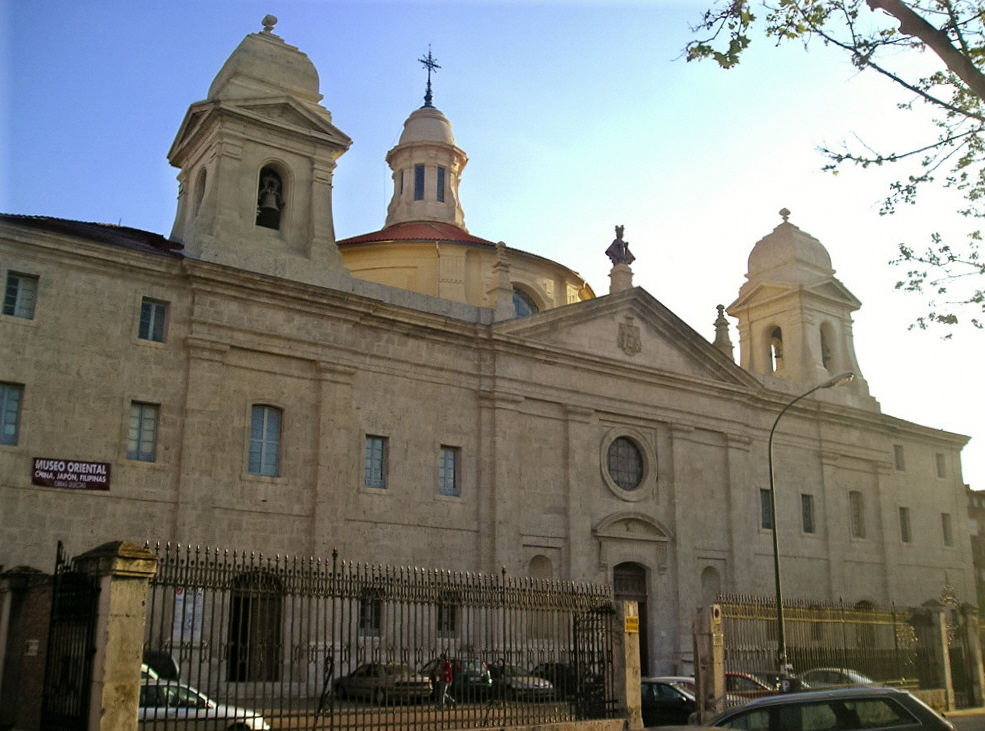
Principal facade of the Convent of the Philippine Augustines in Valladolid.

Rodríguez helped design the Palacio de Liria (1770); Palacio de Altamira (1773–1775) (now the European Institute of Design); the Palace of Infante Don Luis; the Palacio de Almanzora in Almería; and the Palace at Arenas de San Pedro (he also built the Royal Chapel for the Convent/Sanctuary of San Pedro de Alcántara). He helped remodel the Palacio Municipal de Betanzos.

Rodríguez was named Maestro Mayor del Ayuntamiento of Madrid in 1764. Among other works are portions of the plaza mayor de Ávila, the Hospital General de Madrid, the facade of the catedral de Toledo, the Sagrario (1761–1764) of the Cathedral of Jaén, the main retablo for Cathedral of Zamora (1765–1776), which replaced the one by Joaquín Benito Churriguera (brother of José Benito), that had been damaged by the Lisbon earthquake of 1755, the ermita de San Nicasio in Leganés (1772–1780, the baths at Caldas (1773), the sanatorium at Trillo (1775), the jail at Brihuega, and the church at Larravezna. He designed the facade of the cathedral of Pamplona in Neoclassical style. He created the present church at the Monastery of Santo Domingo de Silos; for this project, he almost destroyed all traces of earlier Romanesque constructions. He replaced Lucas Ferro Caaveiro, the original architect, in the rebuilding of the Abbey of San Juan Bautista de Corias in Asturias. Rodríguez was unable to complete several important commissions, the Puerta de Alcalá (finished by Sabatini en 1764), the Basilica of San Francisco el Grande in Madrid (also Sabatini in 1768), Also in Madrid, the refurbishment of the main plaza Puerta del Sol and the construction of the adjacent Real Casa de Correos postal service headquarters, both completed by Jaime Marquet between 1760 - 1768. The church of La Encarnación (1785) in Santa Fe (Granada) was completed by his pupil Domingo Loys de Monteagudo. Of his works, the church for the Convento de San Norberto of the Premonstratensian order, no longer exists. It was torn down by Joseph Bonaparte, also known as Pepe Plazuelas, who was zealous in opening up plaza spaces in Madrid. The first two architects, Silvestre Pérez and Juan Antonio Cuervo, both disciples of Ventura Rodríguez, refused to carry out the destruction of the church.

He died in Madrid in 1785.

A station of the Line 3 of Madrid Metro is named Ventura Rodríguez.

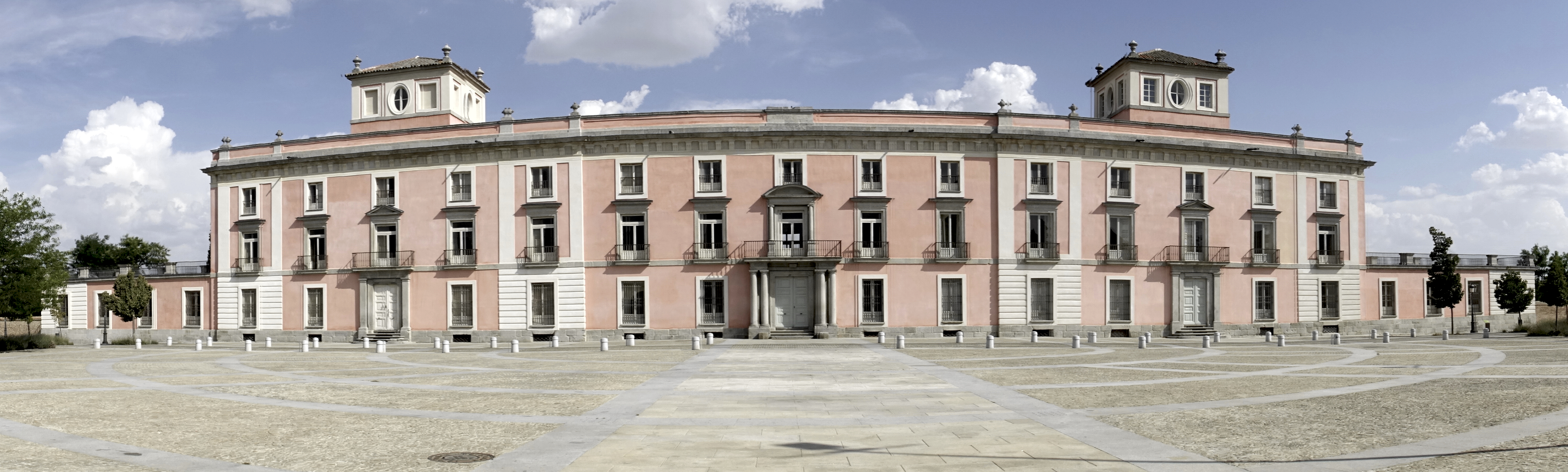
Palace of Infante Don Luis in Boadilla del Monte (Madrid)
