= Luigi Ruspoli, 3rd Marquis of Boadilla del Monte =

Luigi Ruspoli y Godoy

Marquis of Boadilla del Monte
- Tenure: 1886–1893
- Predecessor: Carlota Godoy and Bourbon
- Successor: Prince Camillo Ruspoli
- Born: August 22, 1828; Florence, Grand Duchy of Tuscany
- Died: December 21, 1893; Florence, Kingdom of Italy
- Spouse: 1st Matilde Martellini; 2nd Emilia Landi
- Issue: Princess Carlota Camilla Luisa Ruspoli; Prince Camillo Ruspoli
Names
- Luigi Ruspoli y Godoy
- House: Ruspoli
- Father: Prince Camillo Ruspoli
- Mother: Carlota Godoy and Bourbon

Don Luigi Ruspoli y Godoy, de Khevenhüller-Metsch y Borbón, dei Principi Ruspoli (August 22, 1828 in Florence – December 21, 1893 in Florence) was an Italian and Spanish aristocrat, son of the Prince Camillo Ruspoli and wife Carlota de Godoy y Borbón, 2nd Duchess of Sueca.

He was 3rd Marqués de Boadilla del Monte with a Coat of Arms of Ruspoli (Letter of May 8, 1853) and Prince of the Holy Roman Empire, Knight of Honour of the Sovereign Military Order of Malta, etc.

== Marriages and children ==
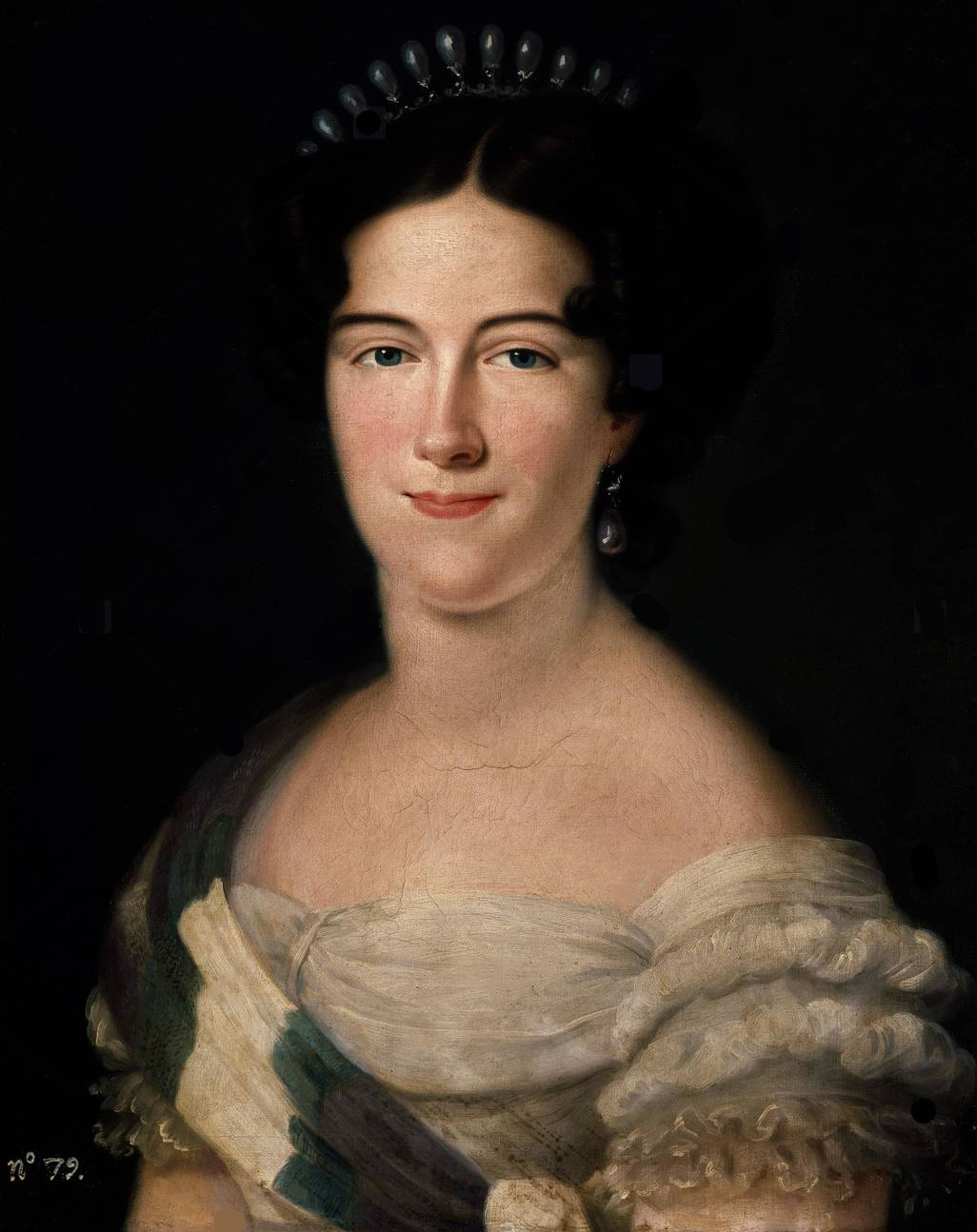
Carlota Godoy y Borbón, II Duchess of Sueca, II Marchioness of Boadilla del Monte

He married firstly in Florence, August 5, 1852 Donna Matilde Martellini (November 13, 1818/1819 in Florence, November 13 – September 8, 1855 in Florence), legitimate daughter of the Marchese Martellini, who was a Mayor (Majordomo-Maggiore) of the Palace of the Grand Duchess of Tuscany, by whom he had a daughter:

- Donna Carlota Camilla Luisa dei Principi Ruspoli (April 5, 1854 in Florence – September 1, 1930 in Nice) married in Florence, September 4, 1872/1892 Enrico, Conte Casalini (1846–1907), by whom she had an only daughter:
  - Matilda, Contessa Casalini (1873 in Florence – 1941 in Nice), unmarried but with illegitimate issue

He married secondly in Florence, February 7, 1863 Nobile Emilia Landi (June 25/26, 1824 in Florence – January 5, 1894 in Florence), by whom he had a son:

- Camillo Ruspoli, 4th Marquis of Boadilla del Monte

=== Sources ===
- Affonso, Domingos de Araújo; Valdez, Rui Dique Travassos (1938). Livro de Oiro da Nobreza. 3 volumes (in Portuguese). Vol. II. Lisbon.
- Hobbs, Nicolas (2007). "Grandes de España" (in Spanish).
- Instituto de Salazar y Castro. Elenco de Grandezas y Titulos Nobiliarios Españoles (in Spanish). periodic publication.

Spanish nobility
| Preceded by Carlota de Godoy | Marqués of Boadilla del Monte; 1886–1893 | Succeeded by Camillo Ruspoli |
