= Paolo Ruspoli, 5th Marquis of Boadilla del Monte =

Paolo Ruspoli
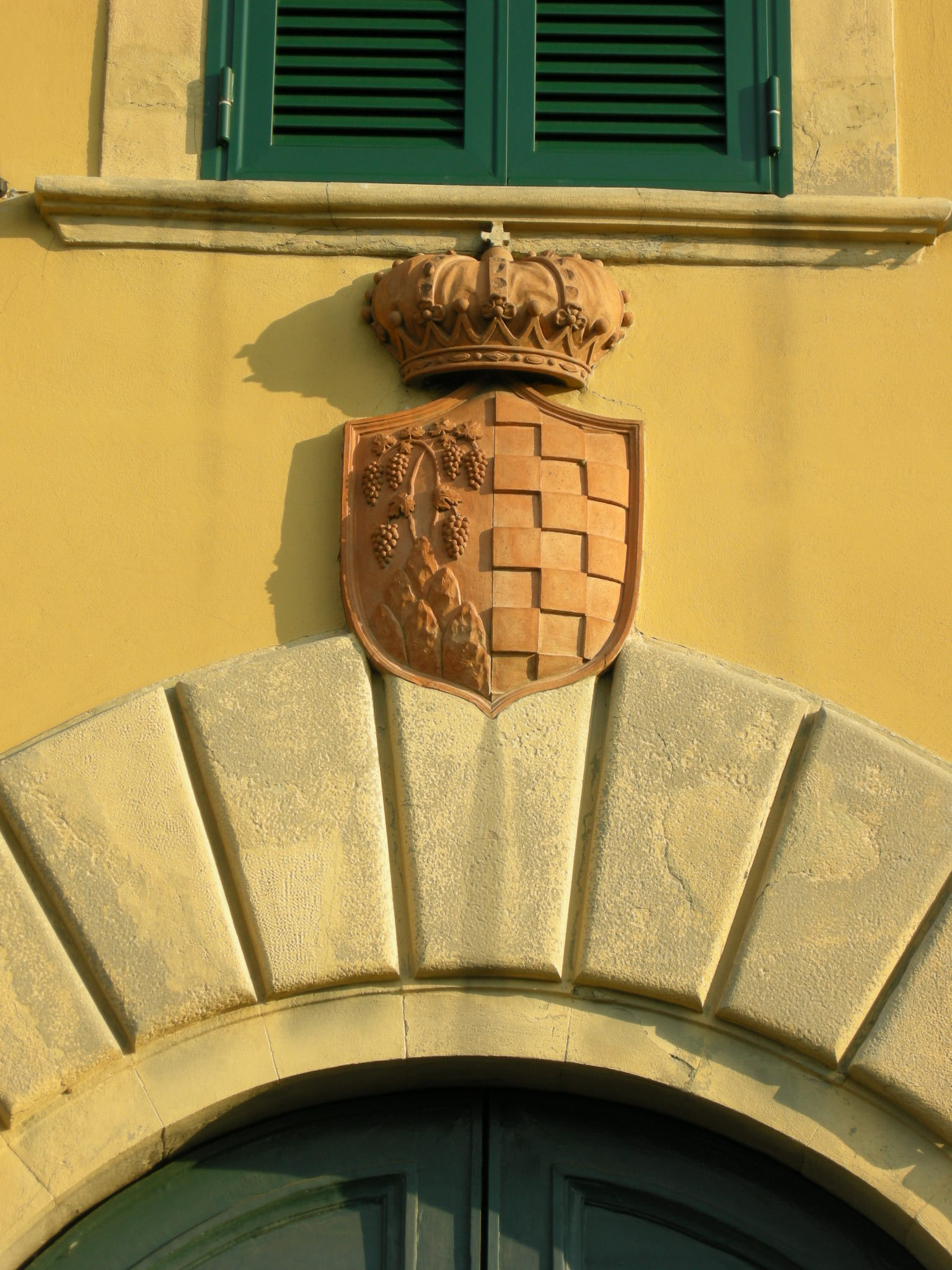

Marquis of Boadilla del Monte
- Reign: 1944–1969
- Predecessor: Prince Camillo Ruspoli y Landi
- Successor: Prince Carlos Ruspoli
- Born: 8 September 1899; Florence, Kingdom of Italy
- Died: 1969; Florence, Italy
Names
- Paolo Ruspoli Orlandini
- House: Ruspoli
- Father: Prince Camillo Ruspoli y Landi
- Mother: Countess Emilia Orlandini del Beccuto

Don Paolo Maria Giulio Camillo Emilio Adriano dei Principi Ruspoli (Montughi, Florence, 8 September 1899 – 1969) was an Italian and Spanish aristocrat, son of Camillo Ruspoli, 4th Marquis of Boadilla del Monte and his wife Emilia dei Conti Orlandini del Beccuto.

He was 5th Marqués de Boadilla del Monte with a Coat of Arms of Ruspoli, and Prince of the Holy Roman Empire.

He died unmarried and without issue and was succeeded in the title by his second cousin Camilo Ruspoli, 4th Duke of Alcudia and Sueca.

== Sources ==
- Affonso, Domingos de Araújo; Valdez, Rui Dique Travassos (1938). Livro de Oiro da Nobreza. 3 volumes (in Portuguese). Vol. II. Lisbon.
- Hobbs, Nicolas (2007). "Grandes de España" (in Spanish).
- Instituto de Salazar y Castro. Elenco de Grandezas y Titulos Nobiliarios Españoles (in Spanish). periodic publication.

Spanish nobility
Preceded by Camillo Ruspoli	Marqués of Boadilla del Monte; 1944–1969	Succeeded by Camilo Ruspoli
