= Camillo Ruspoli, 4th Marquis of Boadilla del Monte =

Camillo Ruspoli Landi

Marquis of Boadilla del Monte
- Tenure: 1893–1944
- Predecessor: Prince Luigi Ruspoli y Godoy
- Successor: Prince Paolo Ruspoli
- Born: 16 January 1865; Florence, Kingdom of Italy
- Died: 7 November 1944; Florence, Kingdom of Italy
- Spouse: Countess Emilia Orlandini del Beccuto (m. 1897)
- Issue: Prince Luigi Francesco Maria Ruspoli; Prince Paolo Ruspoli
Names
- Camillo Carlo Luigi Ruspoli Landi
- House: Ruspoli
- Father: Prince Luigi Ruspoli y Godoy
- Mother: Emilia Landi

Don Camillo Carlo Luigi dei Principi Ruspoli (16 January 1865 in Florence – 7 November 1944 in Florence) was an Italian and Spanish aristocrat, son of Luigi Ruspoli y Godoy, 3rd Marquis of Boadilla del Monte and second wife Donna Emilia, Nobile Landi.

He was 4th Marqués de Boadilla del Monte with a Coat of Arms of Ruspoli (Letter of 28 March 1894) and Prince of the Holy Roman Empire.

== Marriage and children ==
On 7 October 1897, in Florence, he married Emilia dei Conti Orlandini del Beccuto (18 April 1873 in Florence – ?), by whom he had two sons:

- Don Luigi Francesco Maria dei Principi Ruspoli (31 August 1898 in Montughi, Florence – 6 November 1944 in Florence), unmarried and without issue
- Paolo Ruspoli, 5th Marquis of Boadilla del Monte

== Additional information ==
=== See also ===
- Ruspoli

=== Sources ===
- Affonso, Domingos de Araújo; Valdez, Rui Dique Travassos (1938). Livro de Oiro da Nobreza. 3 volumes (in Portuguese). Vol. II. Lisbon.
- Hobbs, Nicolas (2007). "Grandes de España" (in Spanish). Archived from the original on 2012-04-15.
- Instituto de Salazar y Castro. Elenco de Grandezas y Titulos Nobiliarios Españoles (in Spanish). periodic publication.

Spanish nobility
Preceded by Luigi Ruspoli	Marqués of Boadilla del Monte; 1893–1944	Succeeded by Paolo Ruspoli
