= Shirley and Dino =

French comic duo

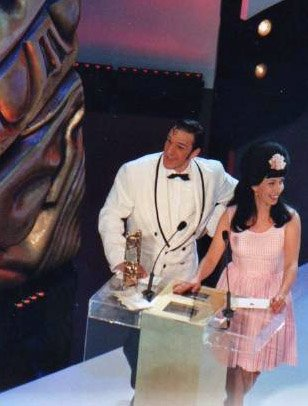
- Shirley and Dino at the 30th César Awards
- Occupation: Comedian
- Years active: 1988–present

Corinne Benizio ("Shirley", born 1962) and Gilles Benizio ("Dino", born 1957), are a French comic duo known by their stagename Shirley et Dino.

== Biographies and debut ==
Gilles was born on June 1, 1957, in Villerupt in Meurthe-et-Moselle and Corinne on February 12, 1962, in Dugny, Seine-Saint-Denis.

The couple met at university in 1982, married in 1985, and made their debut the same year with the stage name "Achilles Tonic". In several of their shows, the duo depicted touching stories about unsuccessful naïve clowns.

"They wrote and directed several shows, including Les Étoiles de Monsieur Édmond (I990), Cabaret Citrouille (I997), Varieta (2000), and Shirley and Dino (2002). They got their big break on TV in Patrick Sébastien's TV show Le plus grand cabaret du monde ..." (Encyclopedia of French Film Directors)

In 2002 they released a partially autobiographical movie 'Cabaret Paradis'.

In 2009 they have played the Baroque King Arthur (opera) by Henry Purcell, and in 2015 they played Don Quichotte chez la Duchesse, a comic ballet by the French Baroque writer Joseph Bodin de Boismortier.

== The Shirley et Dino show ==
Corinne and Gilles created the characters "Shirley and Dino" during an improvisation internship with Ariane Mnouchkine in 2002, and their frequent skits on Patrick Sébastien's TV show "Le plus grand Cabaret du Monde" (The Greatest Cabaret Show of the World) made them famous in France. The release of clips from that show on YouTube in 2011 made them famous around the world, with more than 2.5 million views (as of September 2018).

As 'Shirley and Dino' they played magic tricks that don't work or magic tricks that were "mistakenly" revealed, and sang well-known Chanson style songs off-tune, with the wrong words or misinterpreted lyrics in foreign languages. Shirley, dressed in a 1960s style gingham dress would explain what they are about to do, with outbursts of awkward laughter, and standing in a childish silly posture, while Dino, dressed in a white suit, pants a bit too short, and a wig with two curls on his forehead, constantly interrupts her, mocking her and talking to the crowd.

In 2003 they received the Mulier prize for their "Le Duo" show, as the "Best Sketch Show of the year". According to the official website, Their DVD was sold in more than 1 million copies.

== Theater ==
Year	Title	Author	Director	Notes
1988-89	Vive le Music-Hall	Shirley and Dino	Shirley and Dino	
1990-94	Les Étoiles de Monsieur Edmond	Shirley and Dino	Shirley and Dino	
1993-94	Shirley et Dino	Shirley and Dino	Shirley and Dino	
1996	Le Cabaret du Cinquantenaire	Shirley and Dino	Shirley and Dino	
1997-99	Cabaret Citrouille	Shirley and Dino	Shirley and Dino	
1999	Le Retour de Shirley & Dino	Shirley and Dino	Shirley and Dino	
1999	Nouveau Cabaret de Shirley & Dino	Shirley and Dino	Shirley and Dino	
2000	Shirley et Dino présentent	Shirley and Dino	Shirley and Dino	
2000-01	Variéta	Shirley and Dino	Shirley and Dino	
2002	Le duo	Shirley and Dino	Robert Hossein	Molière Award for Best one man show or Sketches show
2003-04	Les fantaisistes	Shirley and Dino	Robert Hossein (2)	
2004-05	Les Dimanches et Lundis de Shirley et Dino	Shirley and Dino	Robert Hossein (3)	
2006	Le soldat rose	Louis Chedid	Shirley and Dino	
2006-07	30 Exceptionnelles	Shirley and Dino	Shirley and Dino	
2007-09	Les Caméléons d'Achille	Shirley and Dino	Shirley and Dino	
2009	King Arthur	Henry Purcell	Shirley and Dino	
2010	Et ReVOILÀ!	Shirley and Dino	Shirley and Dino	
2013-16	Dino fait son Crooner, Shirley fait sa crâneuse	Shirley and Dino	Shirley and Dino	
2015	Don Quichotte chez la Duchesse	Joseph Bodin de Boismortier	Shirley and Dino	

== Filmography ==
Year	Title	Role	Director	Notes
2006	Cabaret Paradis	Shirley and Dino	Shirley and Dino	

== Television ==
Year	Show	Host	Notes
2001-06	Le plus grand cabaret du monde	Patrick Sébastien	Every month
