= Le soldat rose =

Le soldat rose is a 2006 French-language children's musical with music by Louis Chedid and lyrics by Pierre-Dominique Burgaud. The plot of the musical is about a little boy who hides in the toy section of a department store at night, where the toys come to life.

== Recording ==
The musical was first recorded on the Atmosphériques label in 2006 with a cast including Louis Chédid's son Matthieu, or 'M', Jeanne Cherhal, Alain Souchon, Francis Cabrel, Vanessa Paradis and Stéphane Sanseverino. After the studio sessions the recording line-up gave two live shows at Le Grand Rex, Paris, in November 2006, released on DVD in February following. Sales of the CD were above 350,000 by April 2007, and the album was awarded Best Chanson/Variétés Album at the 2007 Victoires de la musique.

Role	Played by
Le Soldat rose	Matthieu Chedid
Joseph (the boy)	Raoul Lepenec
La Voix du grand magasin	Catherine Jacob
Betty Quette	Jeanne Cherhal
Cousin Puzzle	Albin de la Simone
Made in Asia	Vanessa Paradis
Le Conducteur de train	Sanseverino (singer)
La Panthère noire en peluche	Louis Chedid
Le Petit Chimiste	Bénabar
Le Roi et la Reine	Shirley et Dino
Le Gardien de nuit	Francis Cabrel
L'Homme de ménage	Alain Souchon
La Fiancée du Soldat rose	Céline Bary
