= Riton Liebman =

Belgian comedian, actor and director

- Born: Henri Liebman; 29 January 1964 (age 62)
- Occupations: Actor; comedian; director
- Years active: 1978–present

Henri Liebman (born 29 January 1964), known as Riton Liebman, is a Belgian comedian, actor, and director.

== Career ==
Liebman made his first impression with audiences at age 13, when French director Bertrand Blier discovered him and cast him as Christian in the 1978 film Get Out Your Handkerchiefs, where he is credited simply as Riton. While Liebman said he had strained relations with stars Gérard Depardieu and Patrick Dewaere, Blier defended him during and after filming.

Liebman made his directorial debut with Je suis supporter du Standard (2013).

== Filmography ==
Year	Title	Role	Director	Notes
1978	Get Out Your Handkerchiefs	Christian Belœil	Bertrand Blier	
1979	Démons de midi	Boy in the train	Christian Paureilhe	
1981	Allons z'enfants		Yves Boisset	
1982	Non récupérables	Paumier	Franck Apprederis	TV movie
1982	Après tout ce qu'on a fait pour toi		Jacques Fansten	TV movie
1982	Deuil en vingt-quatre heures	Fernand	Frank Cassenti	TV mini-series
1982	Pause-café	Pierrot	Jean-Claude Charnay	TV series (3 episodes)
1984	Vénus	Norbert Rich	Jean Jabely	
1984	L'addition	Jeannot	Denis Amar	
1984	Les fauves		Jean-Louis Daniel	
1984	Aldo et Junior	Junior	Patrick Schulmann	
1984	La tête dans le sac	Patrick	Gérard Lauzier	
1984	Quidam		Gérard Marx	TV movie
1984	Le vent du nord	Didier	Alain Dhénaut	TV movie
1985	Blessure	Riton	Michel Gérard	
1985	Red Kiss	Joël	Véra Belmont	
1985	Next Summer	Manuel	Nadine Trintignant	
1985	Le mariage du siècle	Pat	Philippe Galland	
1985	He Died with His Eyes Open	Éric Berliner	Jacques Deray	
1986	Kamikaze	Olive	Didier Grousset	
1986	Suivez mon regard	The Italian	Jean Curtelin	
1986	Si t'as besoin de rien, fais-moi signe	Daniel	Philippe Clair	
1987	La petite allumeuse	Antoine	Danièle Dubroux	
1987	Le vampire et le lapin		Boris Bergman	Short
1987	French in Action	Jean-Pierre Bourdon	Pierre Capretz	TV series (1 episode)
1989	Cher frangin	Jarlot	Gérard Mordillat	
1989	Bobby et l'aspirateur		Fabien Onteniente	Short
1990-1996	Imogène	Quémeneur	Paul Vecchiali, Thierry Chabert, ...	TV series (7 episodes)
1991	Toujours seuls	Riton	Gérard Mordillat	
1991	Condamné amour		Xavier Auradon	Short
1992	Drôle d'immeuble		Simon Pradinas	Short
1995	Au petit Marguery	Young Hippolyte	Laurent Bénégui	
1996	Caméléone	The Belgium	Benoît Cohen	
1997	Le pantalon	Moline	Yves Boisset	TV movie
1997	Navarro	Marco	Nicolas Ribowski	TV series (1 episode)
1997	Le juste		Franck Apprederis	TV series (1 episode)
1999	Peut-être	Mathieu	Cédric Klapisch	
2000	Regarde-moi (en face)	Goran	Marco Nicoletti	
2001	Mortel Transfert	The disc-jockey	Jean-Jacques Beineix	
2001	On appelle ça... le printemps	The Appolo Spermator	Hervé Le Roux	
2001	Combats de femme	Man at the discotheque	Sylvie Verheyde	TV series (1 episode)
2002	The Man on the Train	The strong man	Patrice Leconte	
2002	Edouard est marrant	Maxime	Riton Liebman	Short
2002	Boulevard du Palais	Barman 666	Vincent Monnet	TV series (1 episode)
2002	Commissariat Bastille	Nico	Jean-Marc Seban	TV series (1 episode)
2002	Le juge est une femme	Loiseau	Pierre Boutron	TV series (1 episode)
2003	Michel Vaillant	Riton	Louis-Pascal Couvelaire	
2003	Le bison (et sa voisine Dorine)	The banker	Isabelle Nanty	
2003	Caméra Café	The director	Francis Duquet	TV series (1 episode)
2003	Boss of Bosses	Lieutenant Delvaux	Claudio Tonetti	TV series (1 episode)
2003	Anomalies passagères	Rémy	Nadia Farès	TV series (1 episode)
2004	Clara et moi	Didier	Arnaud Viard	
2004	Les bottes	The priest	Renaud Bertrand	TV movie
2005	Tout pour plaire	Bertrand	Cécile Telerman	
2005	The Demon Stirs	The lifeguard	Marie-Pascale Osterrieth	
2005	The Young Lieutenant	Jean	Xavier Beauvois	
2006	Cabaret Paradis	Manu	Corinne & Gilles Benizio	
2006	La reine Sylvie	The mayor	Renaud Bertrand	TV movie
2007	Femmes de loi	Paul Sautter	Gérard Marx	TV series (1 episode)
2007	Une femme d'honneur	Guillaume Vaneck	Jean-Marc Seban	TV series (1 episode)
2007	Les Bleus	The medical examiner	Vincent Monnet & Didier Le Pêcheur	TV series (2 episodes)
2008	.3-8		Sébastien Aubanel	Short
2008	Sa raison d'être	Janvier	Renaud Bertrand	TV movie
2009	One for the Road	Martin	Philippe Godeau	
2009	Vénus & Apollon	Margot's client	Pascal Lahmani	TV series (1 episode)
2010	Mon pote	Thierry	Marc Esposito	
2010	Carlos	OPEP's Hostage	Olivier Assayas	TV mini-series
2010	Camping paradis	Stéphane Richet	Pascal Heylbroeck	TV series (1 episode)
2011	Polisse	Franck	Maïwenn	
2011	L'été des Lip	Roland Vittot	Dominique Ladoge	TV movie
2012	The Dream Team	The bailiff	Olivier Dahan	
2012	La clinique de l'amour!	Young David Marchal	Artus de Penguern & Gábor Rassov	
2013	La grande boucle	Sports presenter	Laurent Tuel	
2013	Je suis supporter du Standard	Milou	Riton Liebman	
2014	À coup sûr	Thierry	Delphine de Vigan	
2014	Une bonne affaire	Horace Araignée	Denis Larzillière	Short
2014	Une brume, un matin	The priest	Nicolas Buysse & Joachim Weissmann	Short
2015	Marjorie	Ludovic	Mona Achache	TV series (1 episode)
2016	The African Doctor	The driving teacher	Julien Rambaldi	
2016	Section de recherches	Lieutenant Laurent Escoffier	Vincent Giovanni	TV series (1 episode)
2017	Mystère Place Vendôme	Count of Alencourt	Renaud Bertrand	TV movie
2018	L'amour flou	The blind rectifier	Romane Bohringer & Philippe Rebbot	
2019	Illégitime	Lieutenant Riquet	Renaud Bertrand	TV movie
2020	C'est la vie		Julien Rambaldi	Completed

== Theater ==
Year	Title	Author	Director
1990-1993	Dirk le Rebelle	Riton Liebman	Bruno Bulté
1997	Néron	Gabor Rassov	Pierre Pradinas
1999	Le baruffe chiozzotte	Carlo Goldoni	Marjorie Nakache
2001	The Colonel Bird	Hristo Boychev	Derek Goldby
2001	Noël à Cavell / Noël en short	Riton Liebman	Riton Liebman
2002-2004	Le Sens du Partage	Riton Liebman	Roland Mahauden
2003	D'avance merci	Riton Liebman	Riton Liebman
2006	Groupe liberté	Riton Liebman	François Monnier
2007	Ein Kind unserer Zeit	Ödön von Horváth	Pierre-Loup Rajot
2016	La Vedette du quartier	Riton Liebman	Jean-Michel Van den Eeyden
2019	La Vedette du quartier	Riton Liebman	Jean-Michel Van den Eeyden
