= Stéphan Perreau =

French art historian and viol player

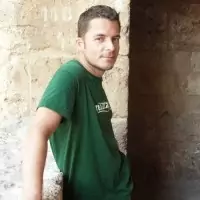

Stéphan Perreau (born 1969) is a French contemporary musician and art historian.

== Biography ==
A holder of a master's degree in art history and early modern period, Perreau studied at the University of Rouen, the Bordeaux Montaigne University and the University of Toulouse-Jean Jaurès. He is a specialist on painter Hyacinthe Rigaud to whom he devoted a monograph published in 2004.

A baroque flautiste and viol player, graduated from the Conservatory of Toulouse and the Conservatoire de Paris, he participated in the revival of the composer Joseph Bodin de Boismortier thanks to a close collaboration with Hervé Niquet, which led to a performance at the Opéra Comique of Don Quichotte chez La Duchesse, from a libretto by Favart. He devoted two recordings to Boismortier as well as a monograph, the first one about this composer, in 2002 (Prix des Muses).

== Principal publications ==
- 2001: Joseph Bodin de Boismortier (1689–1755), un musicien lorrain-catalan à la cour des Lumières, Les Presses du Languedoc, Montpellier, 240 p.
- 2004: Hyacinthe Rigaud (1659-1743), le peintre des rois. Montpellier: Les Nouvelles Presses du Languedoc. 2004. p. 254. ISBN 285998285X.
- 2007: Jan Dismas Zelenka (1679–1745), Bleu Nuit éditeur, Paris, 176 p.
- 2011: Alphonse Hippolyte Joseph Leveau, un représentant de l'académisme bourgeois, "Les Cahiers d'Histoire de l'art", n°9, Voulangis, (p. 77-87).
- 2011: Un portrait de Claude Deshaies-Gendron au musée de Chantilly, "Bulletin des Amis du musée Condé"", n° 68. October, (p. 50-55).
- 2012: Les années parisiennes de Jean Ranc, "L'Estampille-l'Objet d'art", n°475, January, (p. 38-47).
- 2013: Hyacinthe Rigaud (1659–1743), catalogue concis d'œuvre. Montpellier: Les Nouvelles Presses du Languedoc. 2013. p. 400. ISBN 978-2354140977.

Stéphan Perreau is preparing publication of a catalog of the work of Jean Ranc.

== Discography ==
- Joseph Bodin de Boismortier: sonates à deux flûtes sans basse. Arion, ref. ARN63758.
- Pierre Danican Philidor: trois trios pour Hyacinthe Rigaud, Pierre Vérany, ref. PV700036.
- Joseph Bodin de Boismortier: variations en mineur pour flûte traversière seule. Pierre Vérany, ref. PV702111.
