= Le plus grand cabaret du monde =

Television series

- Genre: Entertainment
- Presented by: Patrick Sébastien
- Country of origin: France
- Original language: French
- No. of series: 15

Production
- Production location: Euro Media France
- Running time: 130mins
- Production company: Magic TV

Original release
- Network: France 2
- Release: 26 December 1998 – present

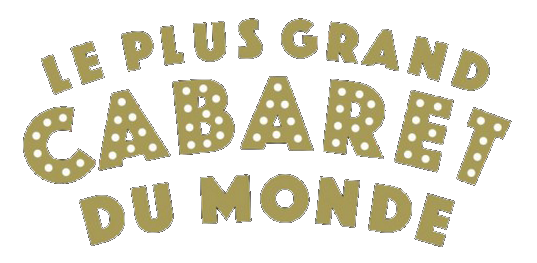
Logo of the Le Plus Grand Cabaret du Monde

Le plus grand cabaret du monde is a French entertainment show series produced by Magic TV and presented by Patrick Sébastien. It is broadcast on France 2 on Saturday nights once per month at prime time and on TV5 Monde. The show is filmed at Euro Media France in Bry-sur-Marne. The show first aired on 26 December 1998 and has since become one of the biggest entertainment shows in the world.

== Overview ==
On a monthly basis, the program alternates numerous cabaret acts (such as clowns, magicians, acrobats and jugglers), and brief discussions of guests around Patrick Sébastien . Guests are not lacking to introduce themselves and talk about their upcoming productions, after which they traditionally have the number that follows. The artists who make the numbers come from around the world. At the end of the show, Patrick Sébastien traditionally sings one of his songs, surrounded by dancers from the Moulin Rouge and in the presence of all the artists who performed that evening.

== Reception ==
Since 31 December 2004, Patrick Sébastien hosts a special program called The Greatest Cabaret in the World on his 31, often exceeding the primetime TF1 (Arthur or Dechavanne). The issue of December 31, 2008 was also the 100th since its inception. December 31, 2009, the great cabaret gathers 1 million more viewers than the larger 100 31 on TF1. Every year, shortly before the new series starts, there is a program where the best numbers of the year are presented by children.

The show is a real success for the public broadcaster: it precedes indeed often competing programs, those of TF1 in particular. It also introduced some scenic artists to the general public (e.g. Christian Gabriel, Dani Lary, etc.).

In September 2008, the tenth anniversary of the show, France 2 broadcast the best moments out of 10 years of cabaret and also released a photo book.

== Awards ==
The show won a 7 d'Or award for best entertainment show in 2000 and 2003, both times by public vote.
