= Portrait of Ferdinand VI as a Boy =

Painting by Jean Ranc

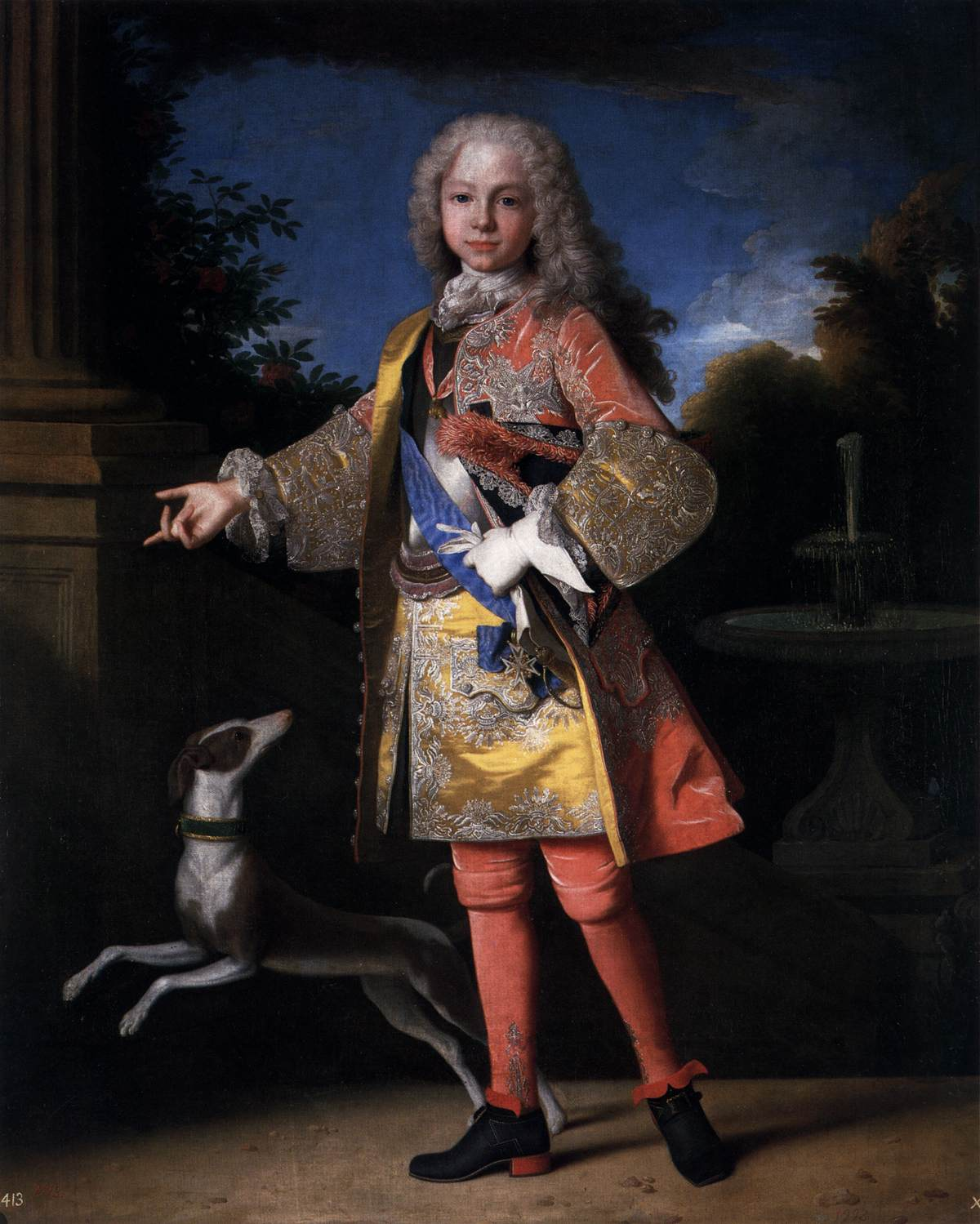
Portrait of Ferdinand VI as a Boy (c. 1723) by Jean Ranc

Portrait of Ferdinand VI as a Boy is a c. 1723 painting by the French painter Jean Ranc, measuring 144 by 116 cm. It is held in the Museo del Prado, in Madrid.

It shows the future Ferdinand VI of Spain aged 10, wearing the insignia of the Order of the Golden Fleece and of a knight of the Order of the Holy Spirit.
