= Cabaret Paradis =

- Directed by: Corinne Benizio; Gilles Benizio
- Written by: Corinne Benizio
- Produced by: Lola Gans; Philippe Martin
- Starring: Corinne Benizio; Gilles Benizio; Michel Vuillermoz; Christian Hecq; Riton Liebman; Maaike Jansen
- Cinematography: Jeanne Lapoirie
- Edited by: Catherine Renault
- Music by: Gilles Douieb
- Distributed by: Pyramide Distribution
- Release dates: 26 March 2006 (Mamers en Mars Film Festival); 12 April 2006 (France)
- Running time: 98 minutes
- Country: France
- Language: French
- Budget: $9 million
- Box office: $1.2 million

Cabaret Paradis (Cabaret Paradise) is a 2006 French comedy film. It was released in France and Belgium on 12 April 2006.

== Plot ==
The plot revolves around Shirley and Dino (Corinne and Gilles Benizio respectively), two entertainers as they purchase an old cabaret, in Paris, which they desperately try to put back on its feet.

== Cast ==
- Corinne Benizio as Shirley
- Gilles Benizio as Dino
- Michel Vuillermoz as Jeff
- Serge Riaboukine as Wladimir
- Christian Hecq as Paco
- Riton Liebman as Manu
- Maaike Jansen as Pakita
- Eriq Ebouaney as The commissioner
