= François-Alexandre Verdier =

French painter

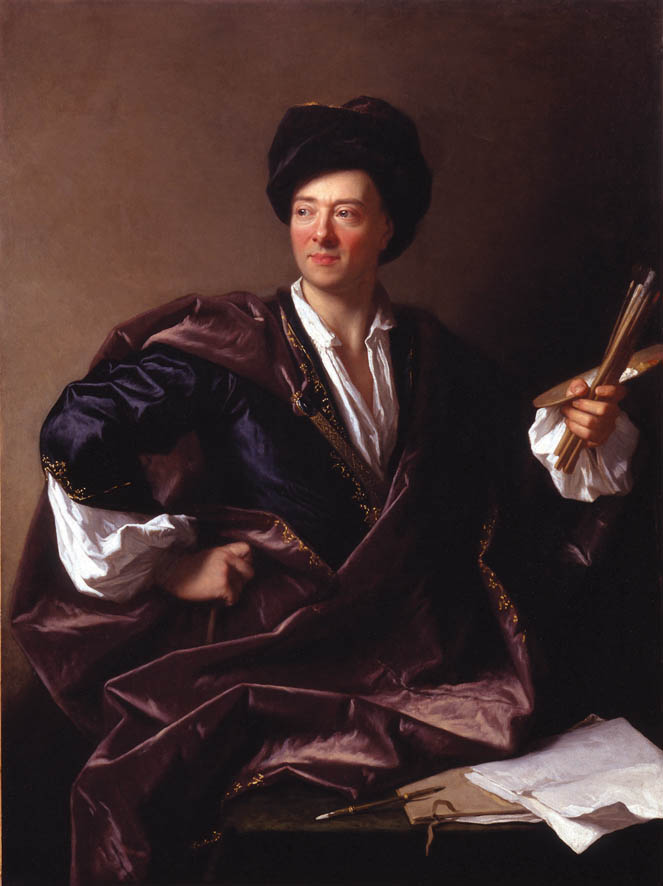
- Portrait of François Verdier by Jean Ranc, presented in 1703
- Born: c. 1651; Paris, France
- Died: 1730; Paris, France
- Awards: Prix de Rome (drawing - twice)

François-Alexandre Verdier (c. 1651–1730) was a French painter, draftsman and engraver. He was a student and assistant of Charles Le Brun.

== Biography ==
François-Alexandre Verdier was born in Paris around 1651. He studied under Charles Le Brun. In 1668 he was awarded the 1st prize in drawing at the Royal Academy of Painting and Sculpture. From 1668 to 1671 he lived in Italy at the Medici Villa. He won the Prix de Rome for drawing in 1668 for his work Première conquête de la Franche-Comté, and again in 1671 for Le Roi donnant la paix à l'Europe. He was admitted to the Academy in 1678. By 1684 he was a Professor. He exhibited at the Salon of 1704. He died in Paris in 1730.

== Works ==
Many of his drawings and paintings are at the Musée du Louvre. They include:

- Saint Paulin de Nole, drawing in red with white chalk highlights, 36.5 cm x 28.5 cm
- Le triomphe de la religion, oil on canvas, 53x43cm, Paris, Musée du Louvre.
- La Chute des anges rebelles, oil on canvas, 163x134cm, Paris, Musée du Louvre.

A number of his drawings on religious subjects were made into prints by the engraver Nicolas-Henri Tardieu and are now held in the Museum of Fine Arts of Nancy.

== Gallery ==
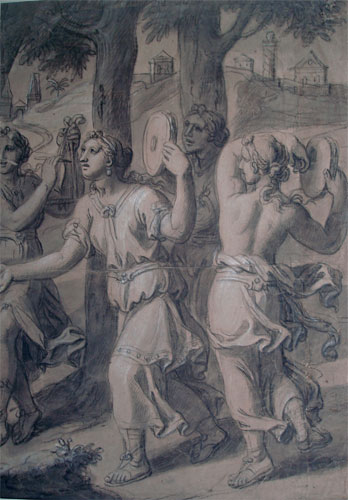
Bacchanales

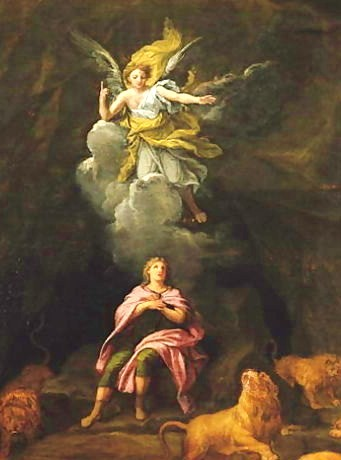
Daniel in the lion's den visited by an angel (detail)

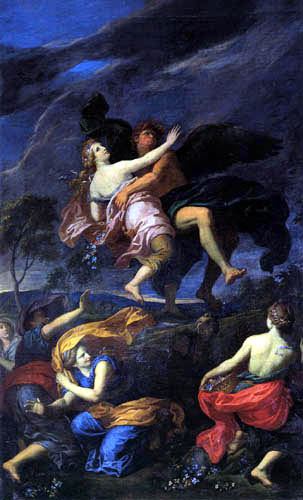
Boreas Abducting Oreithyia (1688)

== Sources ==
- "Archives de l'art français (1851)". gallica.bnf.fr.
- "François Alexandre Verdier". www.villamedici.it. Archived from the original on 2016-03-04.
- "Saint Paulin de Nole". Bibliorare-Association.
- "TARDIEU Nicolas Henri". Joconde.
