= L'Encre de tes yeux =

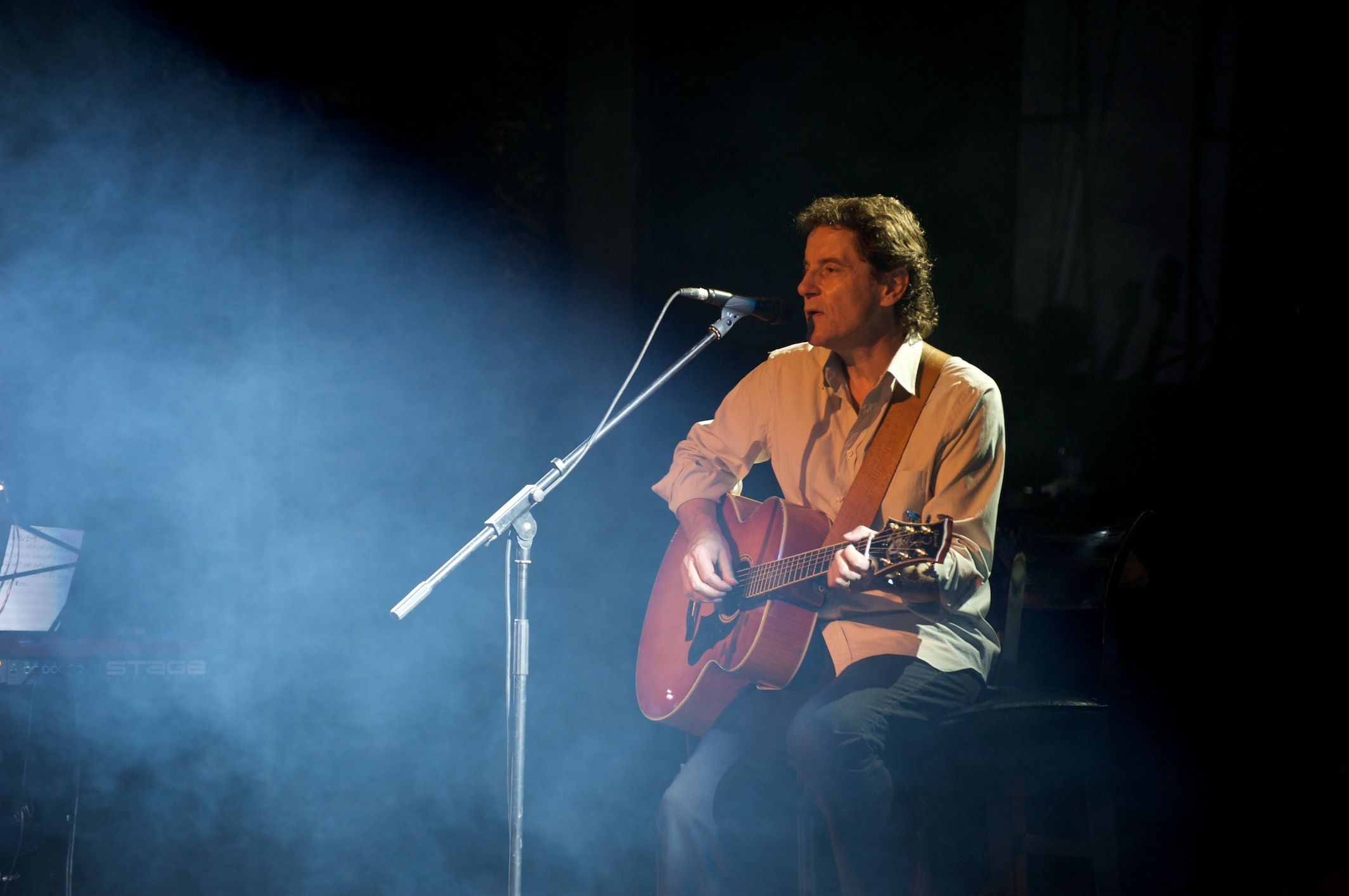
- Francis Cabrel, in 2009

Song by Francis Cabrel

from the album Fragile
- Released: May 1980
- Studio: Studio Condorcet de Toulouse
- Genre: Chanson, Variety, Folk-pop, Romance
- Length: 3:07
- Label: CBS Records
- Songwriter: Francis Cabrel

Fragile chronology
"La Dame de Haute-Savoie"	"L'Encre de tes yeux"	"De l'autre côté de toi"
- Francis Cabrel – L'encre de tes yeux on YouTube

"L'Encre de tes yeux" is a song by singer-songwriter Francis Cabrel, released as a single from the second track of his 1980 album Fragile. The single sold more than 400,000 copies, and the album sold over one million copies, one of the biggest successes of his career and of French chanson.

== History ==
The song is a sentimental and poetic ballad with romantic lyrics, inspired by Bob Dylan's 1962 American folk-pop song "Don't Think Twice, It's All Right" about an impossible romantic relationship. A singer from Lot-et-Garonne accompanies Cabrel on acoustic guitar and tells the woman and muse he loves that all his songs are inspired by her smile and the ink of her eyes: "Everything I've written, it's your smile that dictated it... Everything I've written, I drew from the ink of your eyes..."

Although Francis Cabrel has taken great care to protect his private life, Fabien Lecœuvre speculates that this declaration of love is addressed to his wife and muse Mariette Cabrel (to whom he had dedicated three years earlier, at the time of his marriage, his song Petite Marie from 1977, as well as "Je l'aime à mourir" from 1979). A few years later, in 1980, Francis Cabrel's singing career was in full swing; he was constantly invited to concerts or media appearances, which distanced him from his wife.

Recorded at the Studio Condorcet in Toulouse, this 1980 summer hit was included on the album Fragile, along with another of his major hits, La Dame de Haute-Savoie which also reflects a certain weariness with his artistic life and the consequences of his sudden fame.

The album cover photo, taken by Jean-Baptiste Mondino, is in black and white and shows Francis Cabrel with his hair blowing in the wind.

The song "L'Encre de tes yeux" was also translated and recorded in Spanish by Francis Cabrel under the title "Todo aquello que escribí" (Everything I've written), achieving some success in Latin America.

== Chart ==
Chart (1980)	Peak position
France (IFOP)	5

== Covers ==
This song has been covered by Yves Duteil (on the album Les plus belles chansons françaises, 1996), Les Enfoirés (in a duo with Patrick Bruel and Céline Dion on the album La Soirée des Enfoirés, 1996), Juliette Gréco (on the album Ils chantent Francis Cabrel, 1998), Patrick Fiori (accompanied by 500 chorus members, 2005), and Chico & the Gypsies (2016).
