= Suzanne Bodin de Boismortier =

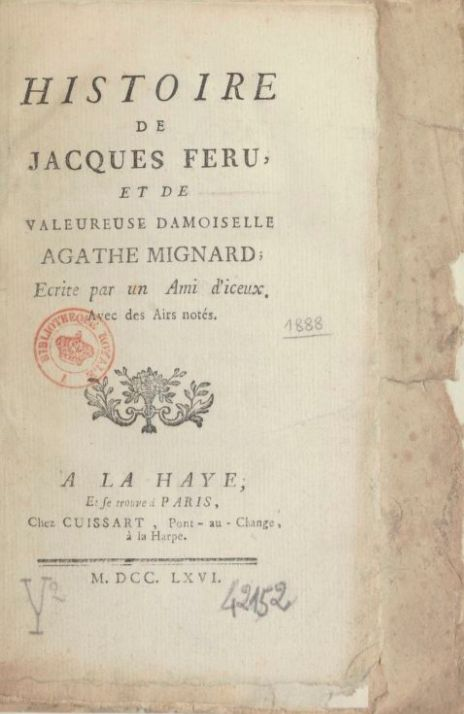
Histoire de Jacques Feru (1766)

Suzanne Bodin de Boismortier (13 November 1722 in Perpignan, Roussillon – 25 June 1799 in Paris) was an 18th-century French femme de lettres.

She was the daughter of composer Joseph Bodin de Boismortier and Marie Valette, daughter of a Catalan goldsmith. The details of her life are unknown, except that she acquired a certain reputation by publishing several plays and two novels: Mémoires historiques de la Comtesse de Mariemberg (Amsterdam, 1751) and Histoire de Jacques Feru et de la valeureuse demoiselle Agathe Mignard (The Hague, 1766).

The authorship of Histoires morales suivies d'une correspondance épistolaire entre deux dames (Paris, 1768) has also been attributed to Suzanne Bodin de Boismortier.

== Sources ==
- Jean Capeille, « Bodin de Boismortier (Suzanne) », in Dictionnaire de biographies roussillonnaises, Perpignan, 1914
