= C'est écrit =

1989 single by Francis Cabrel

Single by Francis Cabrel

from the album Sarbacane
- B-side: "J'ai peur de l'avion"
- Released: August 1989
- Recorded: 1989
- Genre: Ballad, chanson
- Length: 5:50
- Label: CBS
- Composer(s): Michel Françoise
- Lyricist(s): Francis Cabrel, Roger Secco
- Producer(s): Gérard Bikialo

Francis Cabrel singles chronology
"Sarbacane" (1989)	"C'est écrit" (1989)	"Animal" (1990)

"C'est écrit" (transl. French for "It's Written") is a 1989 ballad recorded by French singer Francis Cabrel. Written by Cabrel and Roger Secco with a music composed by Michel Françoise, it was the second single from his seventh studio album Sarbacane, on which it appears as the second track, and was released in August 1989. In France, it was a top ten hit and became one of Cabrel's most popular songs.

== Music and lyrics ==
In the 2020 book Cabrel, une vie en chanson, Thomas Chaline explains that "C'est écrit" is composed of two pieces of lyrics and music originally unrelated, Cabrel having decided to associate a work by Roger Secco with another one by Michel Françoise, two of his friends. Lyrically, the song deals with a love story of a man who does not manage to forget the woman he loves; the title "C'est écrit" indicates that he will never be able to overcome his feelings, as they result from destiny. Expert of the French charts Elia Habib deemed that the "very personal" song's lyrics are full of a "colorful poetry with surreal accents".

== Chart performance ==
In France, "C'est écrit" debuted at number 38 on the chart edition of 26 August 1989, entered the top ten five weeks later where it remained for six weeks with a peak at number six in its ninth week, and fell off the top 50 after 17 weeks of presence. It earned a silver disc, awarded by the Syndicat National de l'Édition Phonographique, thus becoming the most successful single from the album Sarbacane. On the Eurochart Hot 100 Singles, it started at number 83 on 30 September 1989, reached a peak of number 28 in its sixth week, and dropped from on the chart after its 12th week. Much played on radio, it also charted for 11 weeks on the European Airplay Hot 100, with a peak at number 15 in its eighth week, on 4 November 1989, and was number one on the French Airplay Chart (FM stations).

== Cover versions ==
In 1998, Guy Béart recorded an album of covers entitled Les Couleurs du temps, released posthumously in 2020, on which appears a version of "C'est écrit" considered by Anthony Martin of RTL a "gold nugget". In 1999, a singer named MJ recorded his own version of "C'est écrit"; released as a single with Sony label, it charted in France for eight weeks in the top 100 and peaked at number 41 in January 2000.

== Track listings ==
- 7" single
1. "C'est écrit" — 5:50
2. "J'ai peur de l'avion" — 3:52
- 12" maxi
1. "C'est écrit" — 5:50
2. "J'ai peur de l'avion" — 3:52
- CD single
1. "C'est écrit" — 5:50
2. "J'ai peur de l'avion" — 3:52
- 7" single - Canada
1. "C'est écrit" — 5:50
2. "Petite Sirène" — 3:45

== Personnel ==
- Graphics — Charles Le Meur
- Photography — Marie-France Montant

== Charts and certifications ==
=== Weekly charts ===
Chart (1989)	Peak position
Europe (European Airplay Top 50)	15
Europe (Eurochart Hot 100)	28
France (Airplay Chart [FM Stations])	1
France (SNEP)	6
Quebec (ADISQ)	4

=== Certifications ===
Certifications for "C'est écrit"
Region	Certification	Certified units/sales
France (SNEP)	Silver	200,000^{*}
^{*} Sales figures based on certification alone.

== Release history ==
Country	Date	Format	Label
France	1989	7" single	CBS
France	1989	CD single	CBS
France	1989	12" maxi	CBS
Canada	1989	7" single	CBS
