= Louis Chedid =

French singer-songwriter (born 1948)

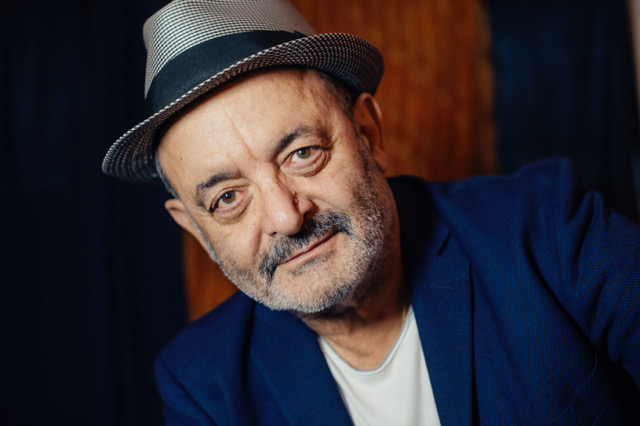

Background information
- Born: Louis Chedid; 1 January 1948 (age 78); Ismaïlia, Egypt
- Genres: Chanson, musical theatre
- Occupations: singer-songwriter author
- Instrument: Guitar
- Years active: 1973–present
- Labels: Atmosphériques, Universal

Louis Chedid (born 1 January 1948, in Ismaïlia) is a French singer-songwriter of Lebanese, Syrian, and Egyptian origin.

== Biography ==
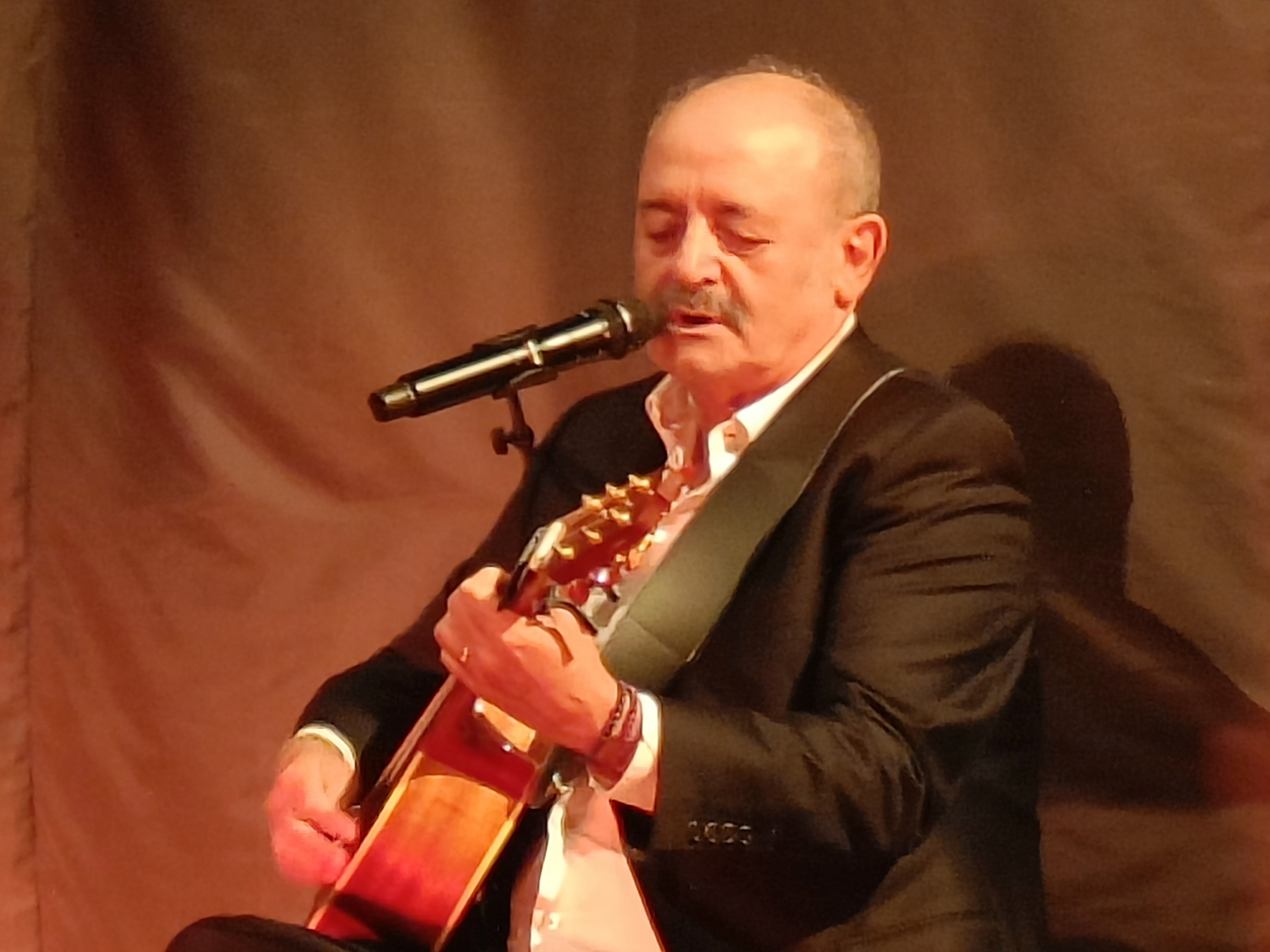
Louis Chedid on stage at Nogent sur Marne 29th of November 2024.

Louis Chedid is the son of the writer Andrée Chedid and the father of Matthieu Chedid (better known as -M-).

As a child he made his first footsteps into the singing world as a member of the Manécanterie des Petits Chanteurs à la Croix de Bois, a famous French Catholic boys choir.

Chedid was a fan of the jazz guitarist Django Reinhardt and decided that he would set forth into a career in the world of music as soon as he left school. After his first album Balbutiements (Mumblings – 1973) attracted little attention, his talent was first recognised after the release of titles like La Belle and T'as beau pas être beau released in 1977.

In 1981, Ainsi soit-il (Amen) rose to the top of the charts, followed four years later by Anne ma sœur Anne (My sister Anne) which criticised the increasing popularity of the far right in France. His first, autobiographical novel, 40 Berges Blues, was published in 1992.

Chedid is also the composer of Pierre-Dominique Burgaud's Le Soldat Rose (The Pink Soldier, 2006), a fairytale musical whose songs have been interpreted by singers including -M-, Vanessa Paradis, Jeanne Cherhal, Francis Cabrel, Alain Souchon and Bénabar.

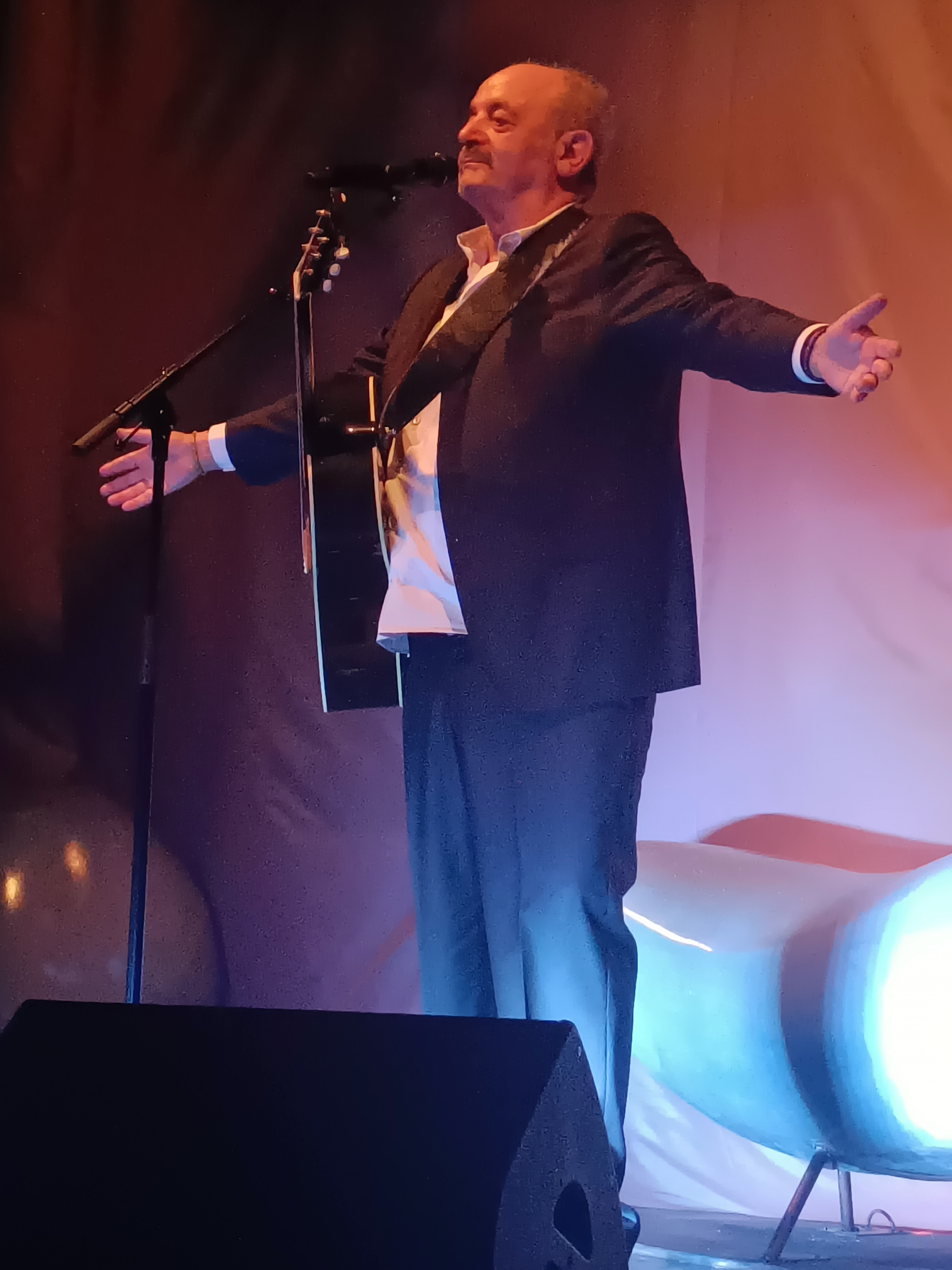
Louis Chedid on stage at Nogent sur Marne 29th of November 2024.

== Discography ==
=== Albums ===
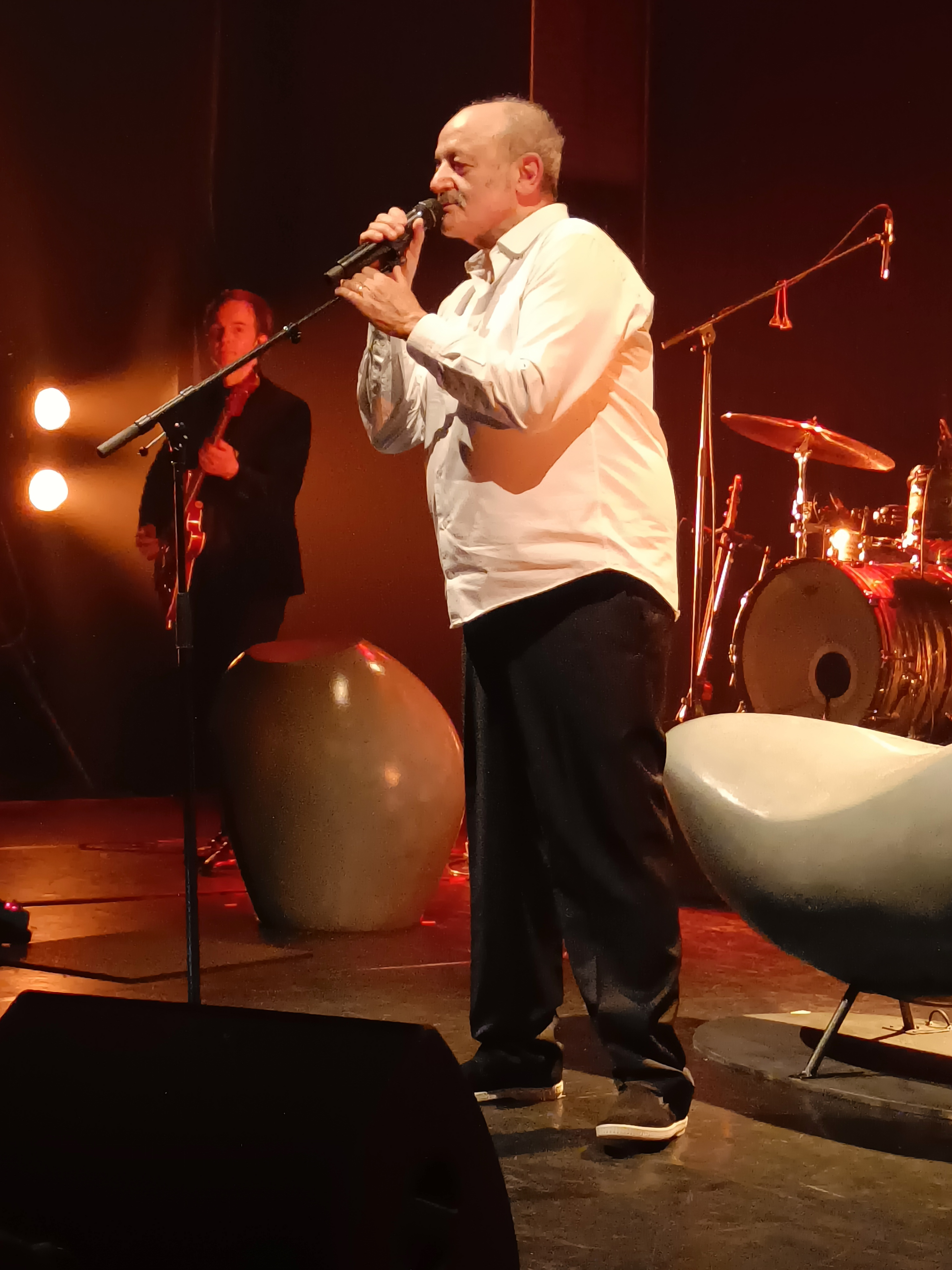
Louis Chedid on stage at Nogent sur Marne 29th of November 2024.

Year	Album	Peak positions	
Year	Album	FRA	BEL (Wa)
1973	Balbutiements	—	—
1974	Nous sommes des clowns	—	—
1974	Hold Up!	—	—
1975	Le jeu de l'oie	—	—
1976	Ver de terre	—	—
1980	Egomane	—	—
1981	Ainsi Soit-il	—	—
1983	Panique Organisée	—	—
1985	Anne, ma sœur Anne	—	—
1987	Bizar	—	—
1989	Zap-Zap	—	—
1992	Ces mots sont pour toi	—	—
1994	Entre nous	—	—
1997	Répondez moi	—	—
2001	Boucbelair	58	—
2003	Botanique et vieilles charrues	71	21
2004	Un ange passe	41	34
2006	Le soldat rose	—	—
2010	On ne dit jamais assez aux gens qu'on aime qu'on les aime	7	18
2013	Deux fois l'infini	75	83
2020	Tout ce qu'on veut dans la vie	14	15
2022	En noires et blanches (with Yvan Cassar)	42	22
2024	Rêveur, rêveur	—	81

=== Promotional singles ===
- "Miss Melissa" (1974)
- "Je chante dans les transistors" (1977)
- "La Belle" / "Chapeau de paille" (1977)
- "T'as beau pas être beau" / "L'Amour S.M.P.M" (1978)
- "Papillon" / "Dans la rue de Sherbrooke" (1979)

=== Collaborations ===
- Fairytale-musical Émilie Jolie (Philippe Chatel, 1979): chanson du raton-laveur-rêveur (Song of the dreaming racoon)
- Duo with his son Matthieu Chedid: Tel père tel fils (like father like son) – for Solidays, a French AIDS charity appeal
