= Joseph Bodin de Boismortier =

French composer (1689–1755)

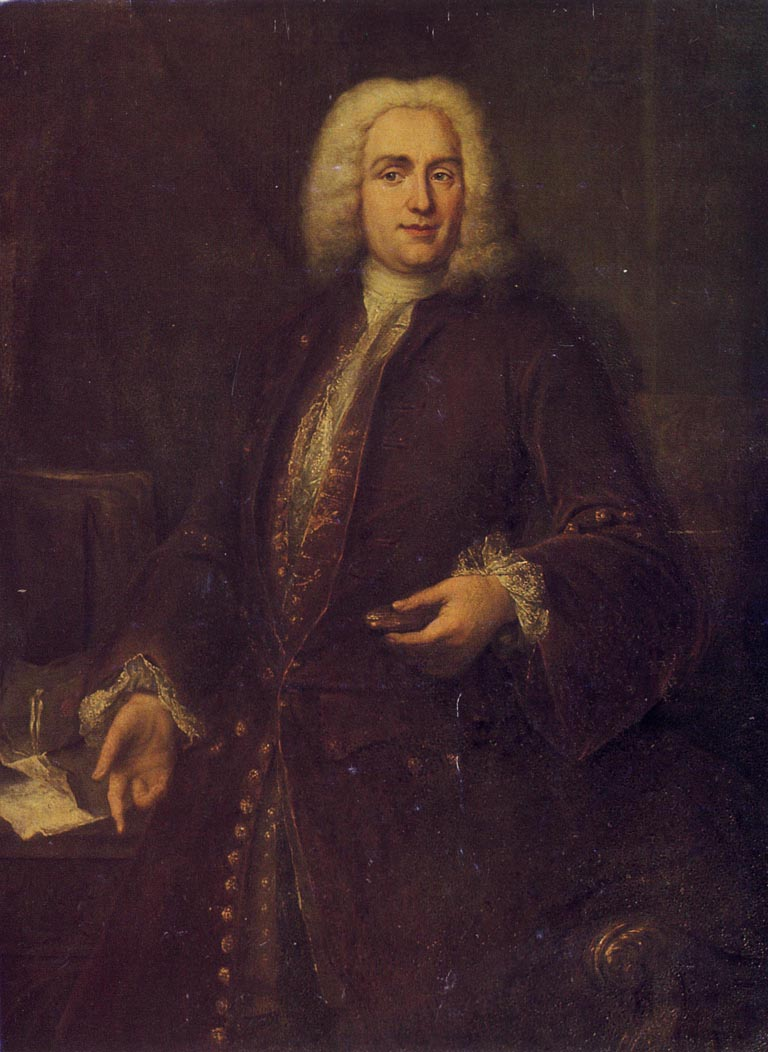
Portrait of Boismortier by Jean Ranc

Joseph Bodin de Boismortier (23 December 1689 – 28 October 1755) was a French baroque composer of chamber music, cantatas, opéra-ballets, and vocal music. Boismortier was one of the first composers to have no patrons: having obtained a royal licence for engraving music in 1724, he made enormous sums of money by publishing his music for sale to the public.

== Biography ==
The Boismortier family moved from the composer's birthplace in Thionville (in Lorraine) to the town of Metz (in the Three Bishoprics) where he received his musical education from Joseph Valette de Montigny [fr], a well-known composer of motets. The Boismortier family then followed Montigny and moved to Perpignan, Rousillon, in 1713 where Boismortier found employment in the Royal Tobacco Control.

Boismortier married Marie Valette, the daughter of a rich goldsmith and a relative of his teacher Montigny. In 1724 Boismortier and his wife moved to Paris where he began a prodigious composition career, writing for many instruments and voices. He was prolific: his first works appeared in Paris in 1724, and by 1747 he had published more than 100 works in various vocal and instrumental combinations. His music, particularly for the voice, was extremely popular and made him wealthy without the aid of patrons.

Boismortier was the first French composer to use the Italian concerto form, in his six concertos for five flutes op. 15. (1727). He also wrote the first French solo concerto for any instrument, a concerto for cello, viol, or bassoon (1729). Much of his music is for the flute, for which he also wrote an instruction method (now lost). Boismortier and Rameau both lived during the Rococo era of Louis XV and upheld the French tradition, composing music of beauty and sophistication that was widely appreciated. Although known as a composer, Bodin de Boismortier was also famed during his lifetime for his excessively inattentive and wandering mind that often kept him from conducting his own works.

His six sonatas for flute and harpsichord op. 91, first published in Paris in 1742, were printed with an homage to the celebrated French flautist and composer, Michel Blavet (1700-1768). Today, they are probably his most popular pieces, for they indeed show Boismortier at his most creative and graceful. A notable piece of Boismortier's that is still often performed is the Deuxieme serenade ou simphonie.

He died in Roissy-en-Brie, where, at his request, he was buried in the Eglise Saint Germain.

The playwright and novelist Suzanne Bodin de Boismortier was his daughter. A full-length biography on the composer, Joseph Bodin de Boismortier, by Stephan Perreau, was published in France in 2001.

== A quotation ==
The music theorist Jean-Benjamin de la Borde wrote in his Essai sur la musique ancienne et moderne (Essay on ancient and modern music) in 1780 about Boismortier: Bienheureux Boismortier, dont la fertile plume peut tous les mois, sans peine, enfanter un volume. (Happy is Boismortier, whose fertile pen can give birth without pain to a whole new volume of music every month.)

In response to such comments, it is said that Boismortier would simply answer "I'm earning money."

== Principal works ==
- Les quatre saisons, cantatas (1724)
- Concerto for cello, viol, or bassoon (1729)
- Les voyages de l'amour, opera ballet (1736)
- Don Quichotte chez la Duchesse, comic ballet (1743)
- Daphnis et Chloé, pastorale (1747)
- Daphné, tragédie lyrique (unperformed) (1748)
- Les quatre parties du monde (1752)
- Les gentillesses, cantatilles (short cantatas)

== Chamber music ==
- Op. 1: 6 Sonates a deux flûtes traversieres sans basse (Paris, 1724)
- Op. 2: 6 Sonates a deux flûtes traversieres sans basse (Paris, 1724)
- Op. 6: 6 Sonates a deux flutes traversieres sans basse (Paris, 1725)
- Op. 7: 6 Sonates en trio pour trois flûtes traversières sans basse (Paris, 1725)
- Op. 8: 6 Sonates a deux flûtes-traversieres sans basse (Paris, 1725)
- Op. 10: 6 Sonates à deux violes (Paris, 1725)
- Op. 11: 6 Suites à 2 Muzettes (Paris, 1727)
- Op. 12: 6 Sonates en trio pour les flûtes-traversieres, violons, ou haubois, avec la basse (Paris, 1726)
- Op. 13: 12 Petites Sonates a deux flûtes traversieres sans basse (Paris, 1726)
- Op. 14: 6 Sonates à deux Bassons, Violoncelles, ou Violes (1726)
- Op. 15: 6 Concertos Pour 5 Flûtes-Traversieres ou autres Instrumens, sans Baße. On peut aussy les joüer avec une Basse (Paris, 1727)
- Op. 17: 6 Suites à 2 Muzettes, qui conviennent aux vieles, flûtes-a-bec, traversieres, & haubois (Paris, 1727)
- Op. 19: 6 Sonates pour la flûte traversière avec la basse (Paris, 1727)
- Op. 20: 6 Sonates à violon seul avec la basse (Paris, 1727)
- Op. 22: 17 Suites: Diverses Pièces pour 2 Flûtes-Traversière (Paris, 1728)
- Op. 26: 5 Sonates pour le violoncelle, viole, ou basson, avec la basse chifree; suivies d'un concerto pour l'un ou l'autre des Instruments (Paris, 1729)
- Op. 27: 6 Suites pour 2 Vieles, Musettes, Flutes-à-bec, Fluts. traversieres, & Hautbois. Suivies de 2 Sonates à Dessus et Basse (Paris, 1730)
- Op. 28: 6 Sonates en trio pour deux haubois, flûtes-traversières ou violons avec la basse, suivies de deux concerto dont le Ier se joue sur la musette, la vièle ou la flûte-à-bec (Paris, 1730)
- Op. 31: 5 Suites: Diverses pièces de viole avec la basse chiffrée (Paris, 1730)
- Op. 33: 6 Gentillesses en trois parties (Paris, 1731)
- Op. 34: 6 Sonates à quatre parties différentes et égalment travailées (Paris, 1731)
- Op. 35: 6 Suites de pièces (Paris, 1731)
- Op. 37: 5 Sonates en trio suivies d'un concerto (Paris, 1732)
- Op. 39: 2 Sérénades ou simphonies françaises en trois parties pour flûtes, violons et haubois (Paris, 1732)
- Op. 40: 6 Sonates pour deux Bassons, Violoncelles, ou Violes suivies d'un nombre de pièces qui peuvent se jouer seul & facilement (1732)
- Op. 42: 6 Pastorales (Duo)
- Op. 44: 6 Sonates pour la flûte traversiere avec la basse (Paris, 1733)
- Op. 50: 6 Sonates dont la derniere est en Trio (Paris, 1734)
- Op. 51: 6 Sonates pour une Flûte traversière et un violon par accords (Paris, 1734)
- Op. 52: 4 Balets de Village en Trio, Pour les Musettes, Vieles, Flutes à-bec, Violons, Haubois, ou Flutes traversieres (Paris, 1734)
- Op. 59: 4 Suites de Pièces de Clavecin (Paris, 1736)
- Op. 66: Petites Sonates suivies d'une Chaconne pour deux Bassons, Violonceles ou Violes (1737)
- Op. 78: 4 Sonates pour deux flûtes-traversières ou autres instruments, avec la basse (Paris, 1738)
- Op. 91: 6 Sonates pour clavecin et une flûte traversière (Paris, 1741)

== Discography ==
Hervé Niquet has a made a substantial number of recordings of Boismortier's works:

- Ballets de Villages (2000) performed by Le Concert Spirituel, conducted by Niquet (Naxos 554295)
- Motets avec Symphonies (1991) performed by Le Concert Spirituel with Niquet (Accord 476 2509)
- Don Quichotte chez la Duchesse (1997) performed by Le Concert Spirituel with Niquet (Naxos 8.553647)
- Daphnis & Chloe (2002) performed by Le Concert Spirituel with Niquet (Glossa GCD 921605)
- Sonates Pour Basses (2005) performed by Le Concert Spirituel with Niquet (Glossa GCD 921609)
- French Music for Two Harpsichords (2000) played by Niquet and Luc Beauséjour (Analekta 23079)

Other recordings include:

- Sonates à deux flûtes traversières sans basse (2001) played by Stéphan Perreau and Benjamin Gaspon (Pierre Verany label PV 700023)
- Sonatas for flute and harpsichord, op. 91 (1994) played by Rebecca Stuhr-Rommereim and John Stuhr-Rommereim (Centaur CRC 2265)
- Joseph Bodin de Boismortier: Six Suites, Op. 35 for Unaccompanied Flute (2008) played by Rebecca Stuhr (Lebende Music)
- Les Maisons de Plaisance (1999) played by Wieland Kuijken and Sigiswald Kuijken (Accent ACC 99132 D)
- Joseph Bodin de Boismortier: Sonatas for Flute and Harpsichord, Op. 91, played by American Baroque (Naxos 8.553414)
- Boismortier: Six Little Suites, Op. 27, played by Reversio-Darius Klisys (6-2 studio/REVERSIO. Catalog number:6-2STD-CD010)
- Daphnis et Chloé (ballet-suite), Kammermusikkreis, Emil Seiler conductor, Walter Gerwig, lute, 1953 recording (Archive Production AP 13027b, 1955), (Heliodor H25018, 1966).
