= Don Quichotte chez la Duchesse =

Don Quichotte chez la Duchesse (Don Quixote at the Duchess) is a "comic ballet" (comédie lyrique) by the French baroque composer Joseph Bodin de Boismortier. Although it is described as a ballet, it is sung throughout with a libretto by Charles Simon Favart.

== Performance history ==
It was first performed on 12 February 1743 at the Académie Royale de Musique et de Dance in Paris.

== Roles ==
- Don Quichotte, haute-contre Jean-Antoine Bérard
- Sancho Pança, taille (baritenor) Louis-Antoine Cuvilliers
- Altisidore, soprano Marie Fel
- Peasant girl, soprano Mlle Bourbonnois
- Woman, soprano
- Duke, bass
- Merlin, basse-taille (bass-baritone) Person
- Montésinos, basse-taille Albert
- Japanese man, basse-taille Person
- Japanese woman, soprano Marie Fel
- Enchanted lovers, sopranos Mlles Clairon and Gondré
- Ballerinas, Marie Anne de Cupis de Camargo and Mimi Dallemand
- Male dancers, David Dumoulin, Louis Dupré and Jean-Barthélemy Lany

== Synopsis ==
The opera is based upon an episode in the Cervantes novel Don Quixote, in which a Duke and Duchess amuse themselves by creating an elaborate ruse to fool the title character.

== Discography ==
- Don Quichotte chez la la Duchesse (Comic Ballet in Three Acts), by Joseph Bodin de Boismortier. Hervé Niquet (conductor) and the ensemble Le Concert Spirituel; Naxos 8.553647 (1996).
- Matthias Maute and the Ensemble Caprice; Atma Classique 5646702 (2024)

== See also ==
- Baroque dance
