= Stéphane Sanseverino =

French singer, guitarist and songwriter

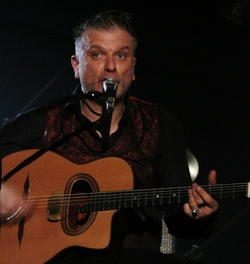
Sanseverino in concert

Stéphane Sanseverino (known as Sanseverino; born 9 October 1961, in Paris) is a French singer, guitarist and songwriter of Neapolitan descent.

He is a self-taught guitarist and an admirer of jazz guitarist Django Reinhardt. His music is inspired by Tzigan music.

== Discography ==
Studio albums

Year	Album	Peak positions		
Year	Album	BEL (Wa)	FRA	SWI
2001	Le tango des gens	–	11	–
2004	Les Sénégalaises	58	5	78
2006	Exactement	56	5	77
2009	Les Faux Talbins	97	34	–
2013	Honky Tonk	105	22	–
2014	Le petit bal perdu	43	16	–
2015	Papillon	123	80	–
2017	Montreuil / Memphis	–	92	–
2021	Les Deux Doigts dans la Prise			

Live albums

Year	Album	Peak positions
Year	Album	FRA
2005	Live au Théâtre Sébastopol	60
2008	Sanseverino aux bouffes du nord	95
