= Francis Cabrel =

French singer-songwriter (born 1953)

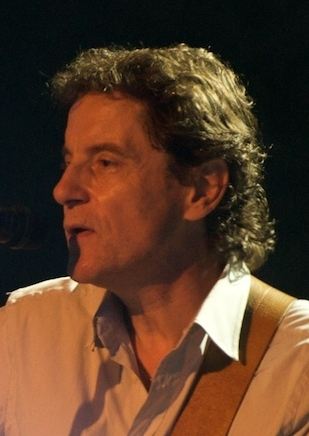
- Cabrel in 2009

Background information
- Born: Francis Christian Cabrel; 23 November 1953 (age 72); Agen, Lot-et-Garonne, France
- Genres: Folk, country, blues
- Occupations: Singer, songwriter, guitarist
- Years active: 1974–present
- Labels: CBS, Columbia

Francis Christian Cabrel (French pronunciation: [fʁɑ̃sis kʁistjɑ̃ kabʁɛl]; born 23 November 1953) is a French singer-songwriter, composer and guitarist. Considered one of the most influential French musical artists of all time, he has released a number of albums falling mostly within the realm of folk, with occasional forays into blues or country. Several of his songs, such as "L'Encre de tes yeux", "Je l'aime à mourir", "Petite Marie", "La Dame de Haute-Savoie", "Encore et encore", "Il faudra leur dire", "Sarbacane", "C'est écrit", "Je t'aimais, je t'aime, je t'aimerai" and "La corrida", have become enduring favourites in French music. Since the start of his career, Cabrel has sold over 25 million albums.

His first hit song was "Petite Marie" in 1974, which was about the woman who soon became his wife, Mariette. His song "Je l'aime à mourir" was covered by Shakira; this version, both sung in French and Spanish, became a major hit single. His song "Edition Spéciale" was featured in the 1987 film Broadcast News, starring Holly Hunter, Albert Brooks and William Hurt.

Although Francis Cabrel is best known as a French-speaking singer, he also sings in Spanish ("La quiero a morir", "Vengo a ofrecer mi corazón"), and even a little in Occitan ("Giors", "Rockstars du Moyen Âge") and Italian.

An unauthorised biography was published in 2015. Cabrel, who is one of the most private French singers, attempted to have the book suppressed.

Cabrel brings support, with the song "Un gramme de terre" with multilingual interpreters, to accompany the documentary Une langue de plus.

== Biography ==
Francis Cabrel was born in Agen, Lot-et-Garonne, France, into a modest family of Venetian Veneto descent. His father was a labourer in a biscuit factory and his mother a cashier in a cafeteria. He has a sister, Martine, and a brother, Philippe. Cabrel spent his childhood in Astaffort, in Lot-et-Garonne.

== Discography ==
=== Studio albums ===
List of studio albums, with selected chart positions, sales figures and certifications
Title	Album details	Peak chart positions							Certifications	Sales
Title	Album details	FRA	BEL (Fl)	BEL (Wa)	CAN	QUE	ROD	SWI	Certifications	Sales
Les Murs de poussière (Note: Les Murs de poussière was originally released as Francis Cabrel.)	Released: 1977; Label: CBS; Format: LP • cassette	—	—		—	—	—	—	FRA: Platinum	
Les Chemins de traverse	Released: 1979; Label: CBS; Format: LP • cassette	2	—		—	—	—	—	FRA: 2× Platinum	
Fragile	Released: 20 May 1980; Label: CBS; Format: LP • cassette	2	—		—	—	—	—	FRA: Diamond	
Carte postale	Released: 14 September 1981; Label: CBS; Format: LP • cassette	—	—		—	15	—	—	FRA: 2× Platinum	
Quelqu'un de l'intérieur	Released: 25 August 1983; Label: CBS; Format: LP • cassette • CD	—	—		—	1	—	—	FRA: 2× Platinum; CAN: Gold	
Photos de voyages	Released: 9 October 1985; Label: CBS; Format: LP • cassette • CD	6	—		—	1	—	—	FRA: 2× Platinum; CAN: Gold	
Sarbacane	Released: 21 February 1989; Label: CBS; Format: LP • cassette • CD	1	—		—	1	—	—	FRA: Diamond; CAN: 2× Platinum; SWI: Platinum	WW: 2,000,000
Samedi soir sur la Terre	Released: 3 April 1994; Label: Columbia; Format: LP • cassette • CD • MiniDisc	1	1		—	1	—	—	FRA: Diamond; BEL: 4× Platinum; CAN: 2× Platinum; SWI: 2× Platinum	
Hors-saison	Released: 29 March 1999; Label: Columbia; Format: LP • cassette • CD • digital download	1	—	1	—	1	—	—	FRA: Diamond; BEL: 2× Platinum; CAN: Gold; SWI: Platinum	
Les Beaux Dégâts	Released: 17 May 2004; Label: Columbia; Format: LP • CD • SACD • digital download	1	75	1	9	2	—	3	FRA: 2× Platinum; BEL: Gold; SWI: Gold	
Des roses et des orties	Released: 31 March 2008; Label: Columbia; Format: LP • CD • digital download	1	81	1	5	3	—	3	FRA: Diamond; BEL: 2× Platinum; SWI: Platinum	FRA: 800,000
Vise le ciel ou Bob Dylan revisité	Released: 22 October 2012; Label: Columbia; Format: LP • CD • digital download	1	63	1	—	14	3	10	FRA: 2× Platinum; BEL: Gold	FRA: 120,000
In extremis	Released: 27 April 2015; Label: Columbia; Format: LP • CD • digital download	1	81	1	5	3	—	3	FRA: 3× Platinum; BEL: Platinum	FRA: 300,000
À l'Aube revenant	Released: 16 October 2020; Label: Columbia; Format: LP • CD • digital download	1	49	1	—	—	—	1		
"—" denotes releases that did not chart or were not released in that territory.

=== Live albums ===
List of live albums, with selected chart positions, sales figures and certifications
Title	Album details	Peak chart positions							Certifications	Sales
Title	Album details	FRA	BEL (Fl)	BEL (Wa)	CAN	QUE	ROD	SWI	Certifications	Sales
Cabrel Public	Released: 16 November 1984; Label: CBS; Format: LP • cassette • CD	—	—		—	1	—	—	FRA: 2× Platinum; CAN: Platinum	
D'une ombre à l'Autre	Released: 30 September 1991; Label: Columbia; Format: LP • cassette • CD	—	—		—	33	—	—	FRA: 2× Platinum	
Double Tour (Électrique & Acoustique)	Released: 16 October 2000; Label: Columbia; Format: LP • CD • digital download	2	—	15	—	43	—	—	FRA: 2× Gold	
La tournée des Bodegas	Released: 21 November 2005; Label: Columbia; Format: LP • CD • CD/DVD • digital download	15	—	21	—	—	—	63	FRA: Gold	
L'In Extremis Tour	Released: 14 October 2016; Label: Sony; Format: LP • CD • CD/DVD • digital download	4	110	3	—	—	4	16	FRA: Gold	
Trobador Tour	Released: 3 December 2021; Label: Sony; Format: LP • CD • CD/DVD • digital download	16	—	7	—	—	—	—		
"—" denotes releases that did not chart or were not released in that territory.

=== Compilation albums ===
List of compilation albums, with selected chart positions, sales figures and certifications
Title	Album details	Peak chart positions							Certifications	Sales
Title	Album details	FRA	BEL (Fl)	BEL (Wa)	CAN	QUE	ROD	SWI	Certifications	Sales
Canta en Español	Released: 1985; Label: CBS; Format: LP • cassette • CD	—	—		—	—	—	—		
Cabrel 77-87	Released: 17 November 1987; Label: CBS; Format: LP • cassette • CD	28	—	12	—	19	—	—	BEL: 2× Platinum; FRA: Diamond; CAN: Gold; SWI: Platinum	
Algo más de amor (1990)	Released: 1990; Label: CBS; Format: LP • cassette • CD	—	—		—	—	—	—		
Algo más de amor (1998)	Released: 6 April 1998; Label: Colombia; Format: LP • cassette • CD	—	—	—	—	27	—	—		
L'Essentiel 1977–2007	Released: 1 June 2007; Label: Colombia; Format: LP • CD • CD/DVD • digital download	44	—	1	—	3	13	13	FRA: Platinum; BEL: Platinum; CAN: Gold; SWI: Gold	
"—" denotes releases that did not chart or were not released in that territory.

=== Box sets ===
List of box sets, with selected chart positions, sales figures and certifications
Title	Album details	Peak chart positions	Certifications	Sales
Title	Album details	FRA	Certifications	Sales
Les Murs de poussière / Les Chemins de traverse / Fragile	Released: 4 November 1996; Label: Columbia; Format: CD	—	FRA: Platinum	
Carte postale / Quelqu'un de l'intérieur / Photos de voyages	Released: 4 November 1996; Label: Columbia; Format: CD	—		
Cabrel Public / Sarbacane / Samedi soir sur la Terre	Released: 7 October 2002; Label: Sony; Format: CD	193		
Collection 1977-1989	Released: 20 November 2015; Label: Sony; Format: CD	—		
"—" denotes releases that did not chart or were not released in that territory.

== Singles ==
=== As lead artist ===
List of singles as lead artist, with selected chart positions and certifications, showing year released and album name
Title	Year	Peak chart positions			Sales	Album
Title	Year	FRA	BEL (Wa)	QUE	Sales	Album
"L'instant d'amour"	1977	—	—	—		Francis Cabrel
"Petite Marie"	1977	137	—	—		Francis Cabrel
"Pas trop de peine"	1978	—	—	—		Francis Cabrel
"Les Murs de poussière"	1978	—	—	—		Francis Cabrel
"Je l'aime à mourir"	1979	1	—	—	FRA: 600,000	Les Chemins de traverse
"Je rêve"	1979	15	—	—	FRA : 100 000	Les Chemins de traverse
"L'Encre de tes yeux"	1980	5	—	13	FRA : 400 000	Fragile
"Je pense encore à toi"	1980	18	—	—	FRA : 150 000	Fragile
"La dame de Haute-Savoie"	1981	—	—	—		Fragile
"Carte postale"	1981	—	—	—		Carte postale
"Répondez-moi"	1982	—	—	—		Carte postale
"La fille qui m'accompagne"	1983	—	—	—		Quelqu'un de l'intérieur
"Saïd et Mohammed"	1984	—	—	—		Quelqu'un de l'intérieur
"Question d'équilibre"	1984	—	—	2		Quelqu'un de l'intérieur
"Encore et encore"	1985	14	—	4	FRA : 250 000	Photos de voyages
"Tourner les hélicos"	1985	—	—	17		Photos de voyages
"Je te suivrai"	1986	—	—	—		Photos de voyages
"Il faudra leur dire" (Cabrel and the children)	1986	2	—	1	FRA : 500 000	Cabrel 77-87
"Sarbacane"	1989	30	—	1		Sarbacane
"C'est écrit"	1989	6	—	4	FRA : 200 000	Sarbacane
"Animal"	1989	31	—	1		Sarbacane
"Tout le monde y pense"	1990	19	—	—	FRA : 60 000	Sarbacane
"Petite Marie" (live)	1990	5	—	8	FRA : 100 000	D'une ombre à l'autre
"Je t'aimais, je t'aime, je t'aimerai"	1994	78	—	1		Samedi soir sur la Terre
"La cabane du pêcheur"	1994	—	—	1		Samedi soir sur la Terre
"La Corrida"	1994	7	—	3	FRA : 75 000	Samedi soir sur la Terre
"Octobre"	1995	88	—	1		Samedi soir sur la Terre
"Samedi soir sur la Terre"	1995	—	—	14		Samedi soir sur la Terre
"Vengo a ofrecer mi corazón" (with Mercedes Sosa)	1997	—	39	—		Algo más de amor (1998)
"Presque rien"	1999	—	—	8		Hors-saison
"Le reste du temps"	1999	—	—	1		Hors-saison
"Hors-saison"	1999	133	—	—		Hors-saison
"Le monde est sourd"	2000	—	—	2		Hors-saison
"Ma place dans le trafic" (live)	2000	—	—	—		Double Tour
"Bonne nouvelle"	2004	—	—	7		Les Beaux Dégâts
"Qu'est-ce que t'en dis?"	2004	—	—	9		Les Beaux Dégâts
"Tu me corresponds"	2004	—	—	—		Les Beaux Dégâts
"Les gens absents"	2005	—	—	15		Les Beaux Dégâts
"Je pense encore à toi" (live)	2005	—	—	—		La tournée des Bodegas
"Gardien de nuit"	2006	—	—	40		Le Soldat Rose
"Le gorille"	2007	—	—	—		L'Essentiel 1977-2007
"La robe et l'échelle"	2008	—	2	11		Des roses et des orties
"Le chêne liège"	2008	—	31	34		Des roses et des orties
"Des hommes pareils"	2009	—	22	21		Des roses et des orties
"Né dans le Bayou"	2009	—	—	23		Des roses et des orties
"Les cardinaux en costume" (live)	2009	—	17 (Note: These songs did not enter the Ultratop 50 (Walloon), but rather the sales chart Ultratip 50.)	—		—N/a
"Comme une femme"	2012	130	5	—		Vise le ciel ou Bob Dylan revisité
"Je te veux"	2012	—	26	—		Vise le ciel ou Bob Dylan revisité
"Partir pour rester"	2015	42	39	—		In extremis
"Dur comme fer"	2015	—	13	—		In extremis
"À chaque amour que nous ferons"	2015	141	—	—		In extremis
"Le pays d'à côté"	2016	—	28	—		In extremis
"Te ressembler"	2020	25	—	—		À l'Aube revenant
"Peuple des fontaines"	2021	144	—	—		À l'Aube revenant
"À l'Aube revenant"	2021	88	—	—		À l'Aube revenant
"Rockstars du Moyen Âge"	2021	98	—	—		À l'Aube revenant
"Un morceau de Sicre"	2023	—	—	—		—N/a
"—" denotes releases that did not chart or were not released in that territory.

=== As featured artist ===
List of singles as featured artist, with selected chart positions, showing year released and album name
Title	Year	Peak chart positions		Album
Title	Year	FRA	BEL (Wa)	Album
"La complainte de la butte" (with Patrick Bruel)	2002	48	—	Entre deux
"Tout reste à faire" (with Souad Massi)	2010	—	15	Ô houria
"Petite Marie" (with Umberto Tozzi)	2012	—	25	Yesterday: The Best of 1976-2012
"Sueno" (Gipsy Kings featuring Francis Cabrel)	2014	—	—	Savor Flamenco
"—" denotes releases that did not chart or were not released in that territory.

== Other charted songs ==
List of songs, with selected chart positions, showing year released and album name
Title	Year	Peak chart positions		Album
Title	Year	FRA	BEL (Wa)	Album
"Madame n'aime pas"	2009	—	12	Des roses et des orties
"Les filles à quoi ça sert" (with Bénabar, Jean-Jacques Goldman and Alain Souchon)	2011	—	3	Titeuf
"Lucie" (with Nolwenn Leroy)	2014	193	—	Kiss & Love
"Mademoiselle l'aventure"	2015	150	—	Des roses et des orties
"—" denotes releases that did not chart or were not released in that territory.

== Videography ==
- Sarbacane tour (1989)

== Footnotes ==
Preceded by Claude Nougaro	Victoires de la Musique; Male artist of the year 1990	Succeeded by Michel Sardou
