= Jean Ranc =

French painter (1674–1735)

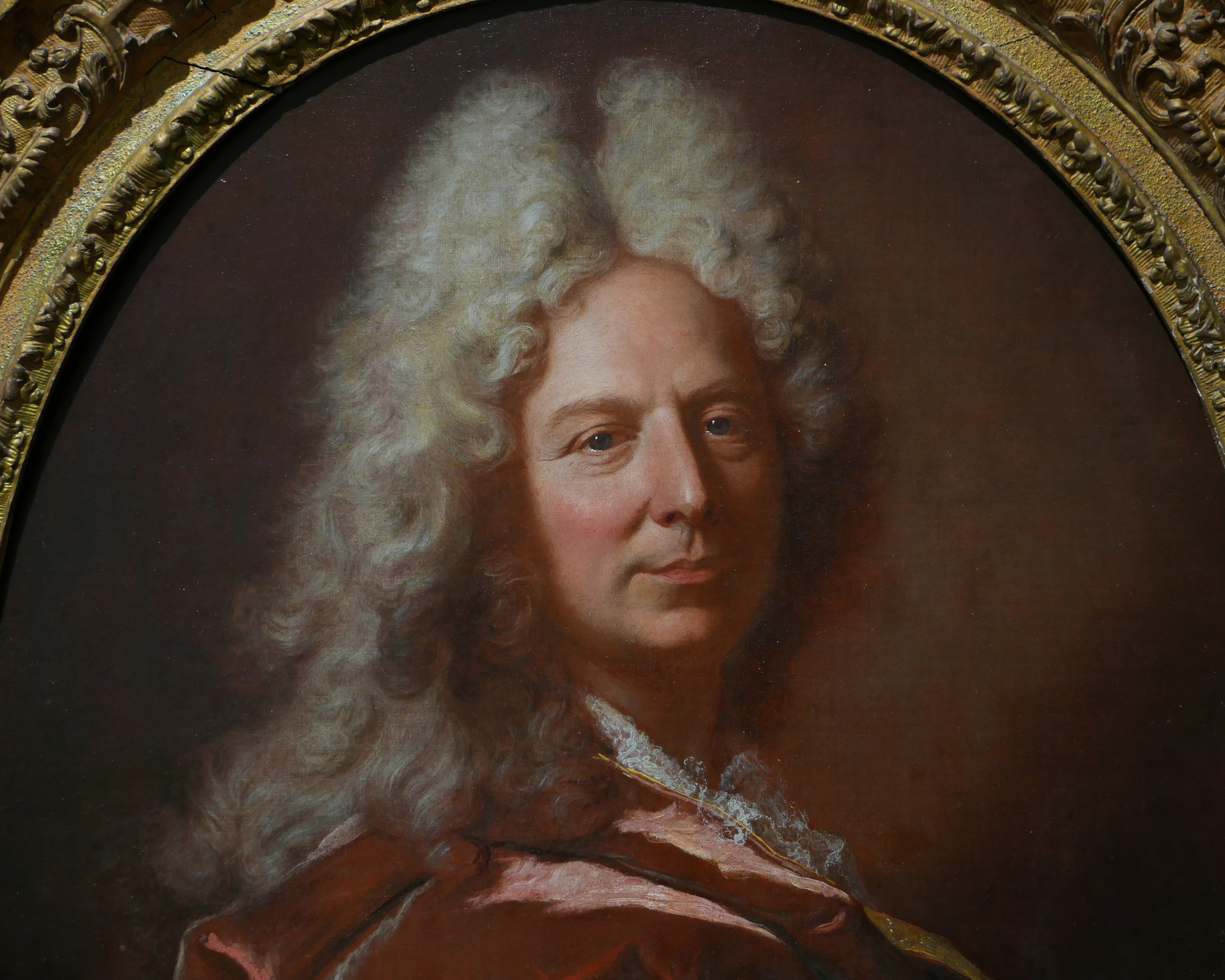
Ranc, in a presumed self-portrait

Jean Ranc (28 January 1674 – 1 July 1735) was a French painter, mainly active in portraiture. He trained under his father Antoine Ranc and his father's former student Hyacinthe Rigaud and served in the courts of Louis XV of France, Philip V of Spain, and John V of Portugal.

== Life ==
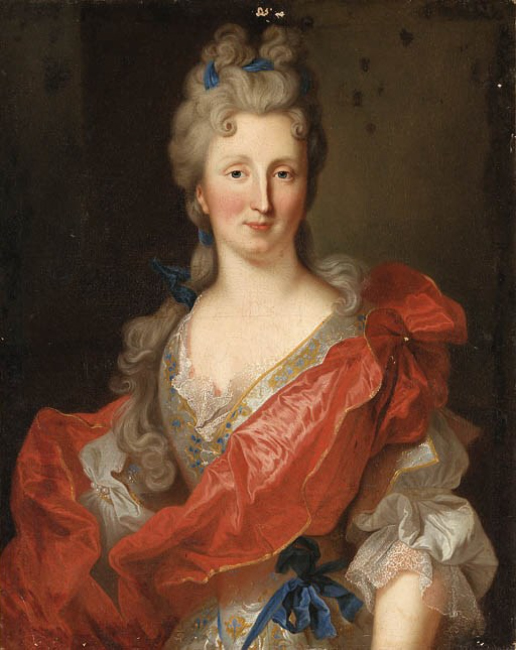
Louise Augustine Salbigothon Crozat, duchesse de Broglie, painted by Ranc

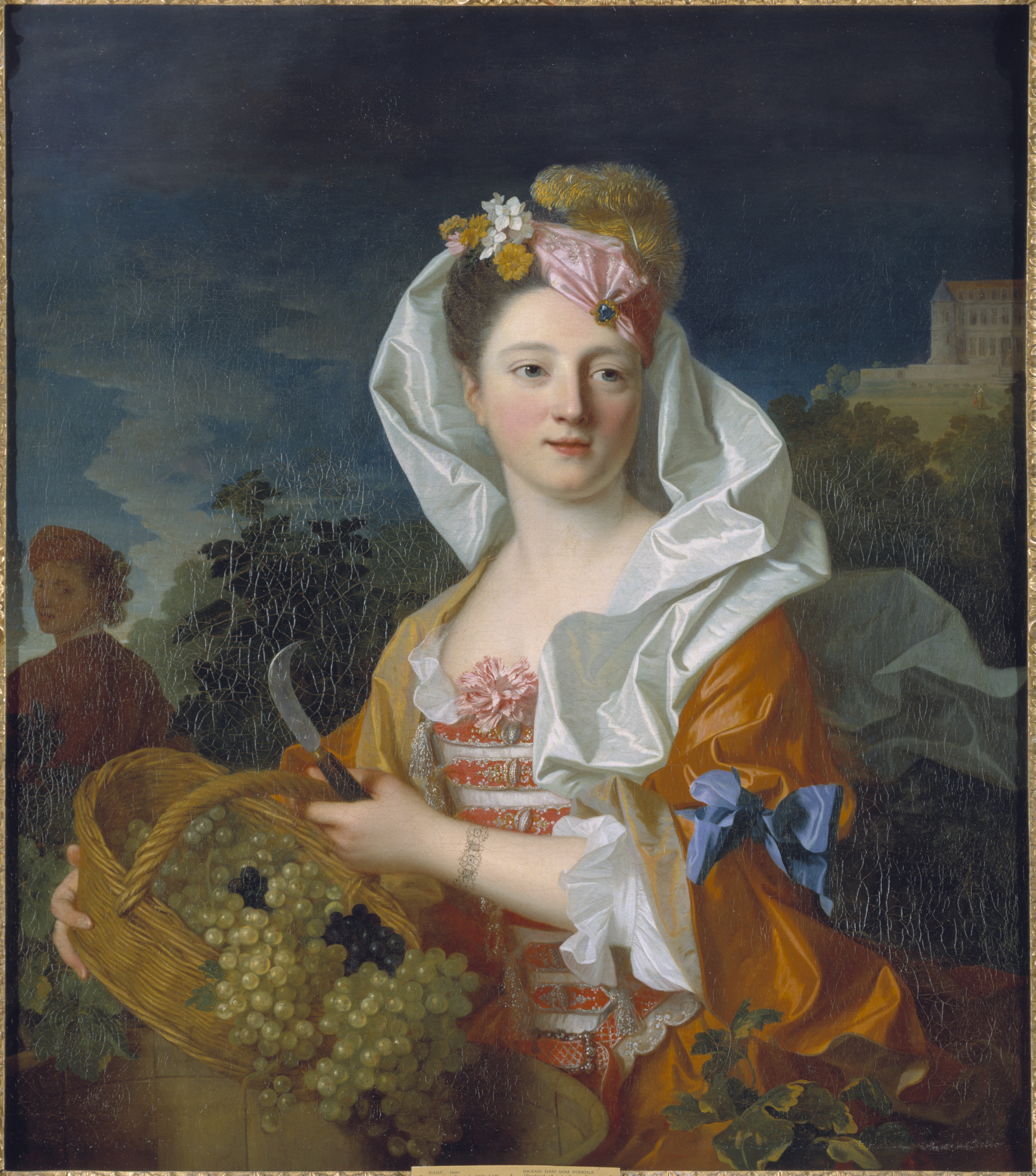
Pomona

=== Early life ===
Ranc "the younger" was born in Montpellier, the son of the provincial portraitist Antoine Ranc "the elder". Antoine had a personal collection of paintings by the European masters, and received many young artists into his studio, including Hyacinthe Rigaud from 1671.

Jean Ranc moved to Paris in 1696, and became the student of Rigaud, working in his studio. Ranc registered with the Académie on 30 December 1700, being received into it on 28 July 1703 as a portraitist for his portraits of Nicolas van Plattenberg, known as "Platte-Montagne" (1631–1706) and that of François Verdier (1651–1730). Despite aspirations to become a history painter, he was never received as such by the Académie.

Jean Ranc then became established as a portraitist to the Parisian bourgeoisie and produced a large number of paintings in the styles of Rigaud and Nattier; Ranc was cheaper than Rigaud. On 13 June 1715 he married his god-daughter and the niece of his teacher, Marguerite Elisabeth Rigaud, daughter of the painter Gaspard.

=== Madrid ===
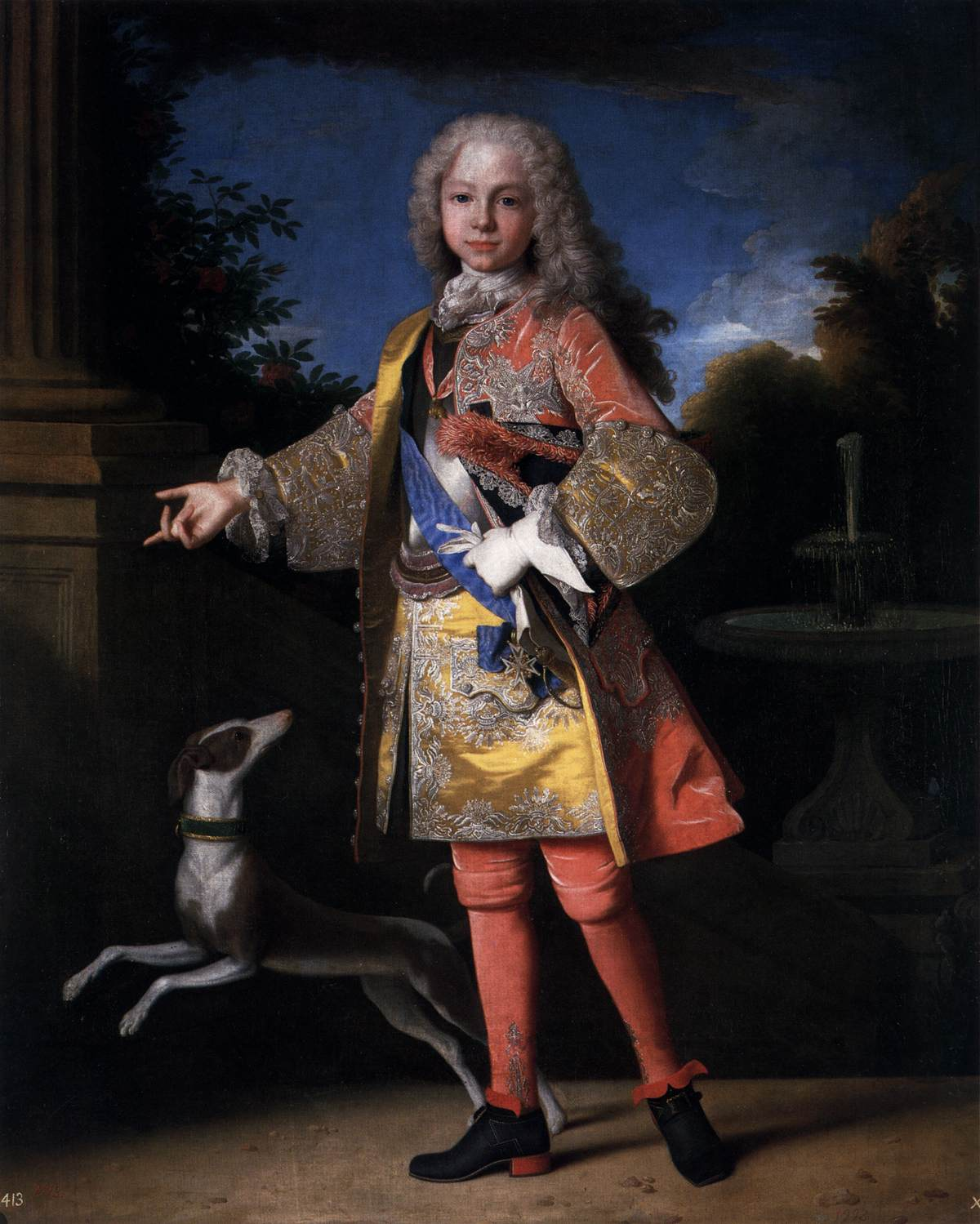
Portrait of Ferdinand of Bourbon (1713-1759), later King of Spain.

On the Bourbons' arrival in Spain with the coronation of Philip V, grandson of Louis XIV of France, none of the French painters sent to Spain seemed to be making any impact. Repeated excuses were made to the French court for the low quality of the portraits sent them by the Spanish Bourbons. Philip V wrote to Versailles in 1721 not only to obtain a beautiful portrait of the teenage Louis XV but also to obtain a French painter worthy of this name amidst the famous triumvirate De Troy, Largillierre and Rigaud. Rigaud was most preferred by Philip, having painted him masterfully in 1701, but Rigaud guided him towards the young artists better suited to moving to a far-off country, such as Jean Raoux from Montpellier. Raoux refused the offer and next Rigaud thought of Jean Ranc, who had married Rigaud's niece in 1715. All these transactions were aided by cardinal Dubois, then first minister to Louis XV. Thus began Ranc's main career.

Hoping to have a high-flying career in a country where there was no French portraitist to equal or surpass him, Ranc left for Madrid, arriving in 1724 with his five children: Antoine Jean-Baptiste, Hyacinthe, Marguerite Elisabeth, Claude and Hyacinthe-Joseph. Two further children, Jean-Baptiste and Antonia, were born in Madrid.

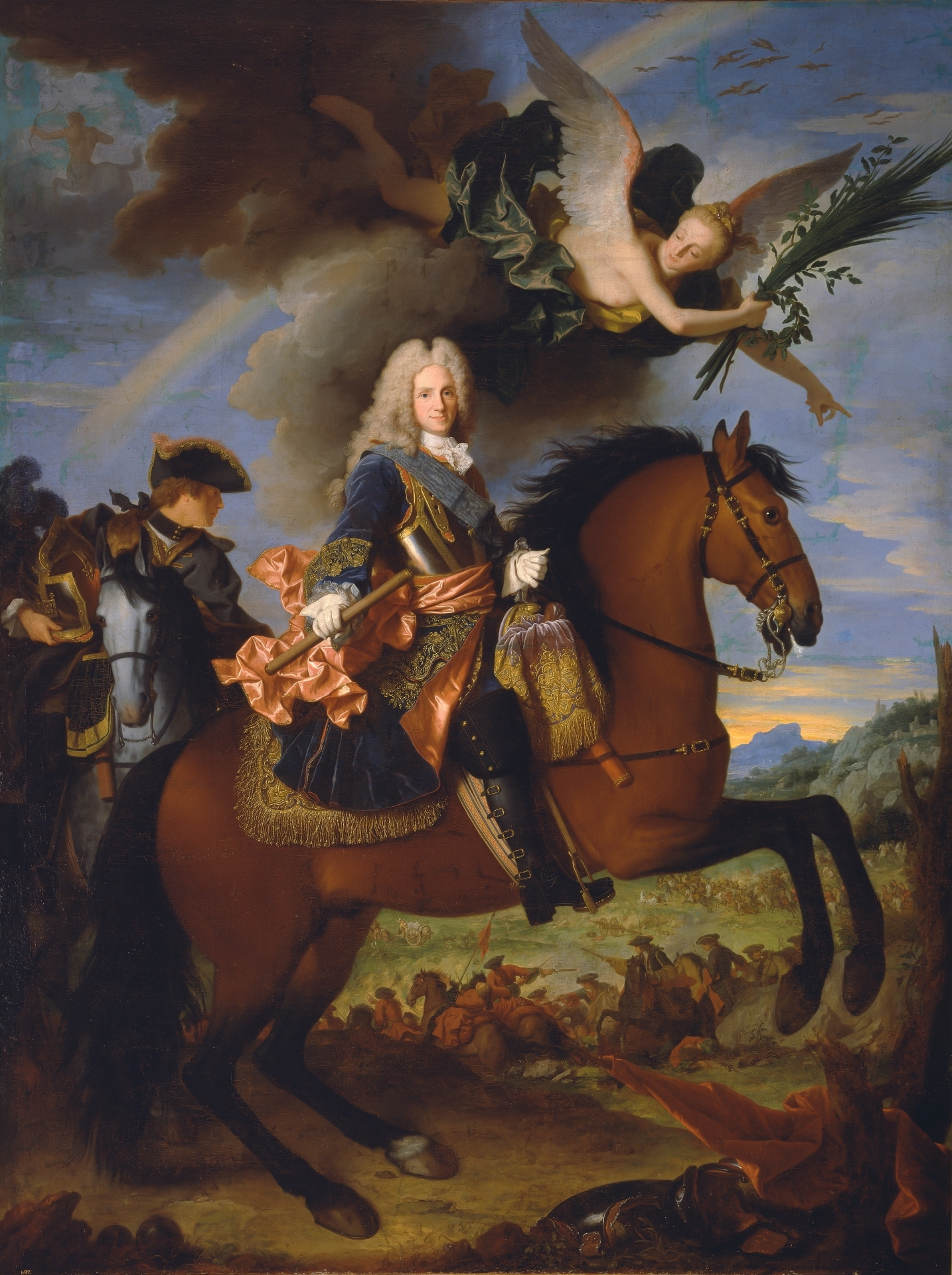
Equestrian portrait of Philip V of Spain (museo del Prado)

Ranc then spent a year in Lisbon from 1729 to 1730 to sketch the faces of the Portuguese monarchy. Thanks to his fashion of allying the "melting touch of Rigaud with the Castilian vehemence of Vélasquez", he established a new iconography for the Spanish Bourbons. This met with the approval of Philip V, who found in Ranc's portrait of his son Charles III a good alternative to Spanish works by Carreno de Miranda (portrait of Charles II).

Suffering from criticism by Spaniards "who sought to do only harm to a foreigner", Ranc's stay in Spain was not at all restful. In vain he demanded the cross of the Order of Saint Michael or the post of Maestro de Obras Reales (Master of Royal Works), left vacant by the death of Andrea Procaccini (1671–1734). In Spain he had a long and serious dispute with his colleague Michel Ange Houasse due to their artistic jealousy and desire to excel at court. The Royal Alcazar of Madrid was destroyed in a fire at Christmas 1734. The fire had started in one of Ranc's rooms at the old Habsburg palace. Suffering from problems with his sight, Ranc became severely depressed, and died in Madrid in 1735, aged 61.

On Ranc's death, Rigaud was once again asked to choose an official painter to the Spanish court, as attested by Dezallier d'Argenville:

On the death of sieur Ranc his nephew, he had to appoint the first painter to His Catholic Majesty, Rigaud, commissioned to choose him, sent Monsieur Vanloo le fils there, who long occupied this rank with distinction, and who is no less distinguished in this town now.

== Style ==
Ranc had a close relationship with Rigaud; in addition to Ranc's being Rigaud's pupil and married to his niece, Rigaud had been a student of Ranc's father, Antoine. Ranc's style is thus considerably indebted to Rigaud's and works by him have sometimes been misattributed to Rigaud or to others. For example, when sent to auction at the Hôtel Drouot in 1993, his portraits of Joseph Bonnier de la Mosson and his wife were wrongly attributed to Rigaud and said to represent the President of La Mésangère and his wife; they came back on the Venetian art market attributed to Largillierre, who had painted the latter couple in three-quarters bust. The male portrait proved to be an exact replica of Ranc's portrait of Joseph Bonnier de la Mosson at the Musée Fabre in Montpellier, while the portrait of his wife followed the formula of Rigaud's portrait of Madame Le Gendre de Villedieu, illustrating the close relationship between their styles.

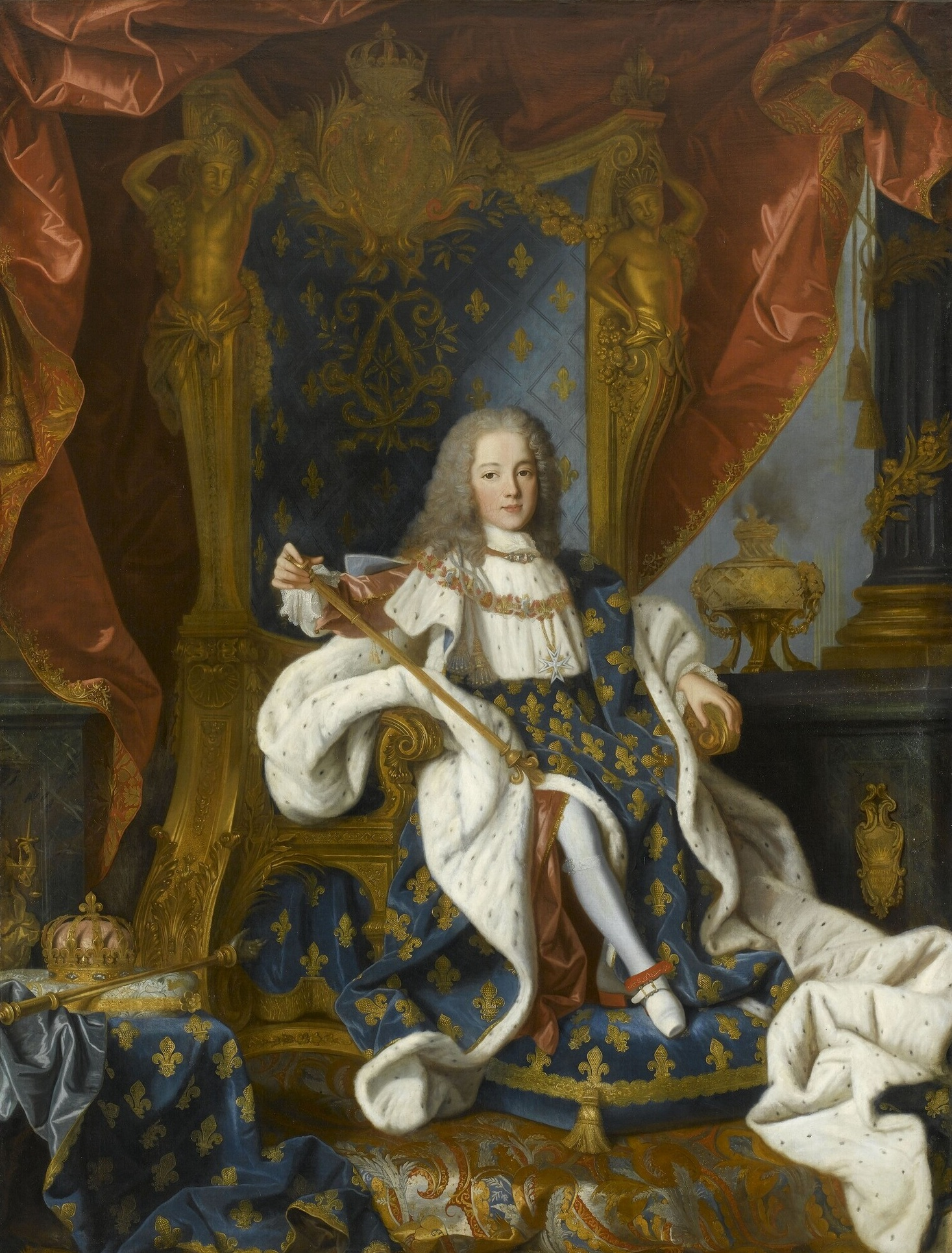
Portrait of Louis XV as a child (Musée de l'Histoire de France, Palace of Versailles)

In his 1710 portrait of Joseph Delaselle, a merchant and arms-dealer from Nantes (Musée des Beaux-Arts de Nantes) Ranc used Rigaud's vocabulary of drapery and a relaxed pose in a rural landscape. His 1719 portrait of the nine-year-old Louis XV in royal costume (Musée de l'Histoire de France, Palace of Versailles, right) echoes Rigaud's portrait of the five-year-old Louis (also at Versailles). The imitation is such that Ranc uses not only similar regalia, but also the heavy drape animating the scene, the column and the ermine mantle. Later, in his portraits of members of the Spanish court, Ranc would imitate Rigaud's style even more closely, but with less suppleness and vitality.

Ranc made use of military posture and details drawn from Rigaud for a portrait of Daniel-François de Gélos de Voisins d’Ambres, comte de Lautrec: the baton decorated with the fleur-de-lys, the flowing drapery, the extended hand, the tree trunk, and the battle scene. This work's attribution to Ranc has sometimes been questioned, and another version and its female pendant have been attributed to Jean-Marc Nattier (Geneva, Musée d'Art et d'Histoire) but this portrait definitely shows Rigaud's influence, if not on Ranc then on an assistant in the atelier. Ranc's style was very close to that of Rigaud, but can be readily distinguished by the very slender hands and especially the sharp folds in the draperies which appear in his works; Rigaud's draperies are much softer and more malleable. Ranc's portraits show a lack of spontaneity in the depiction of the sitters, caused by an over-precise technique. Rigaud's faces are extraordinarily lifelike, however Ranc excelled in the pageantry and colour of his art.

== Gallery ==
Jean Ranc's paintings

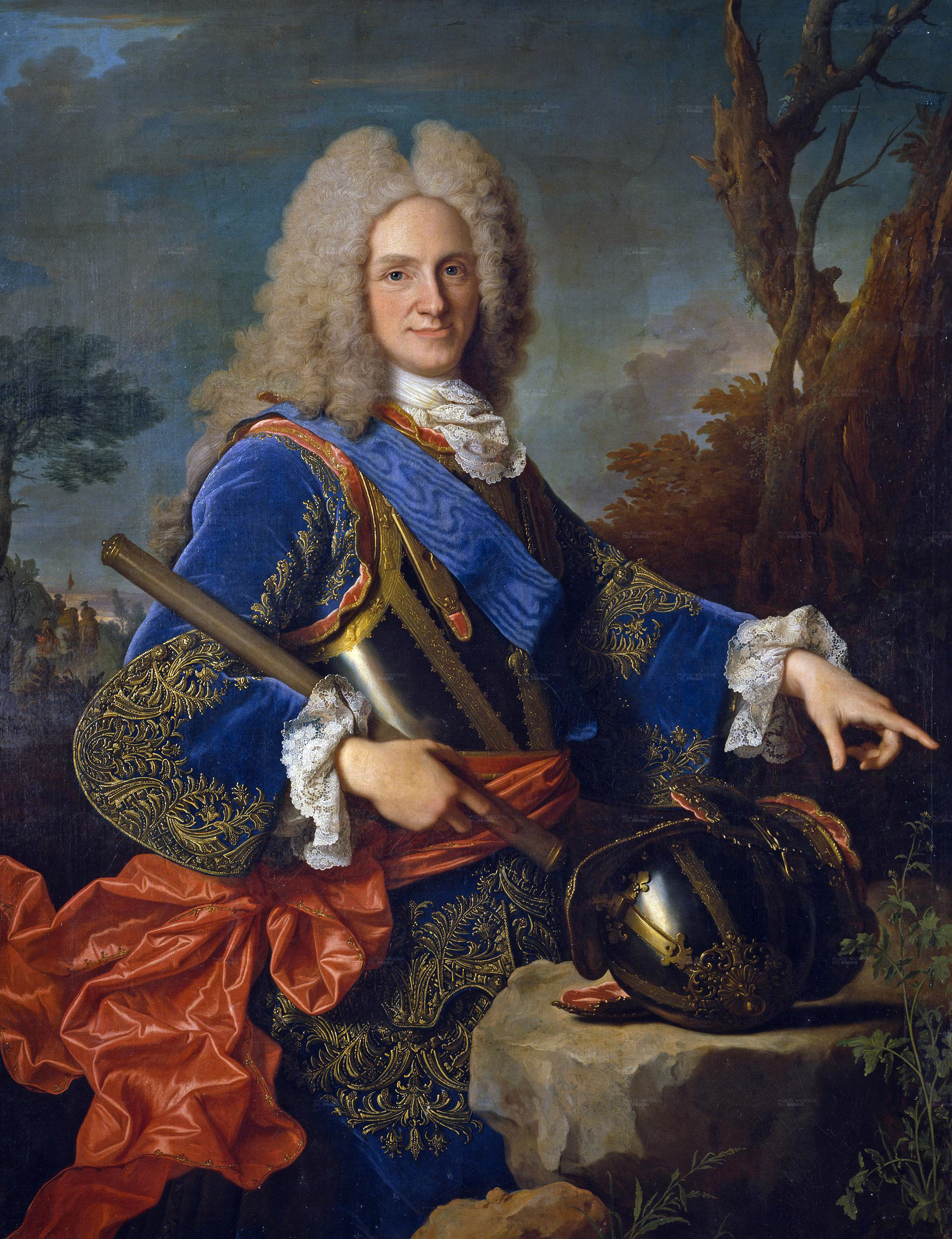
Philip V in 1723 (Museo del Prado)

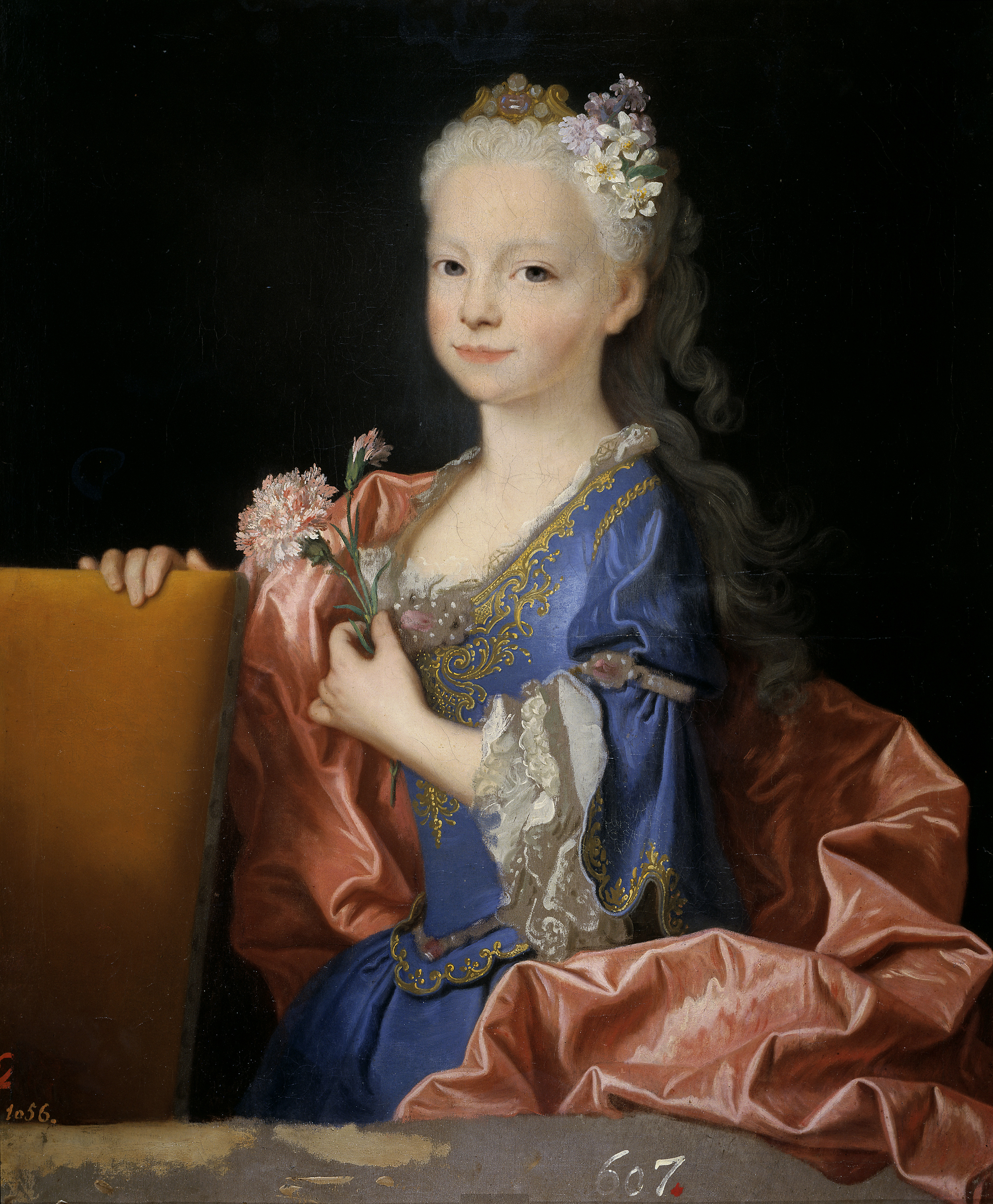
Maria Anna Victoria of Spain, future Queen of Portugal, wearing the royal outfit of a Spanish Infanta.

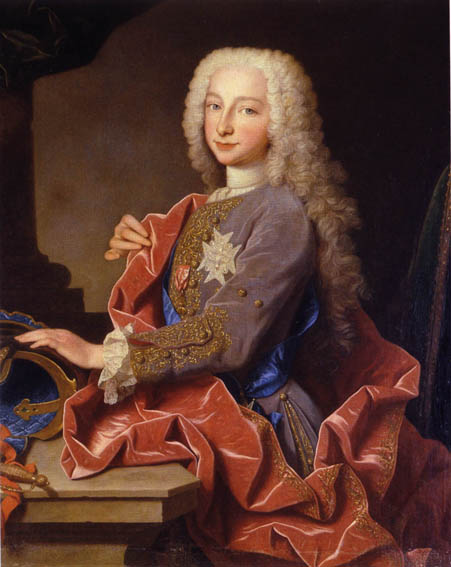
Portrait of Charles of Bourbon, future King Charles III of Spain.

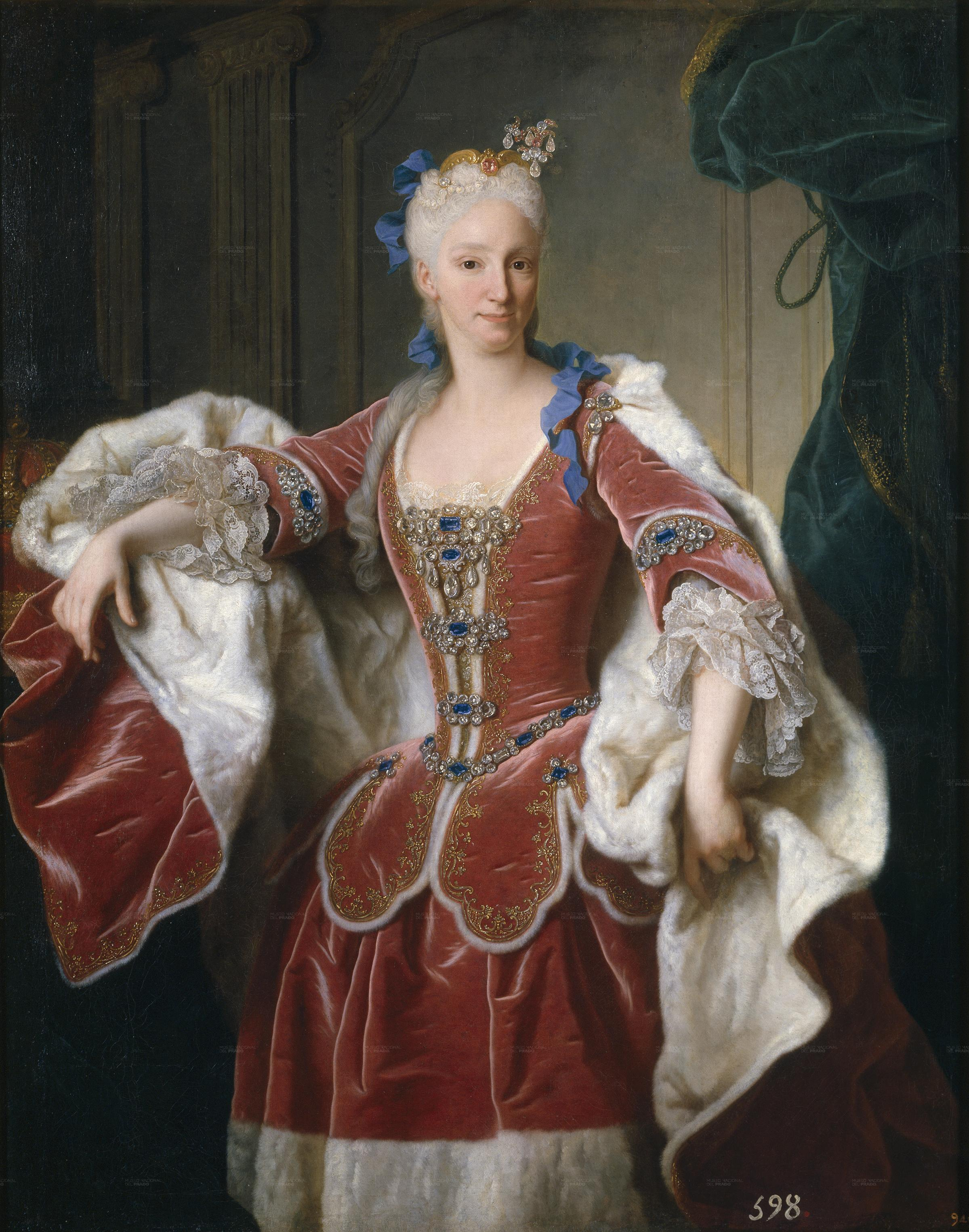
Portrait of Elisabeth Farnese, Princess of Parma and Queen of Spain

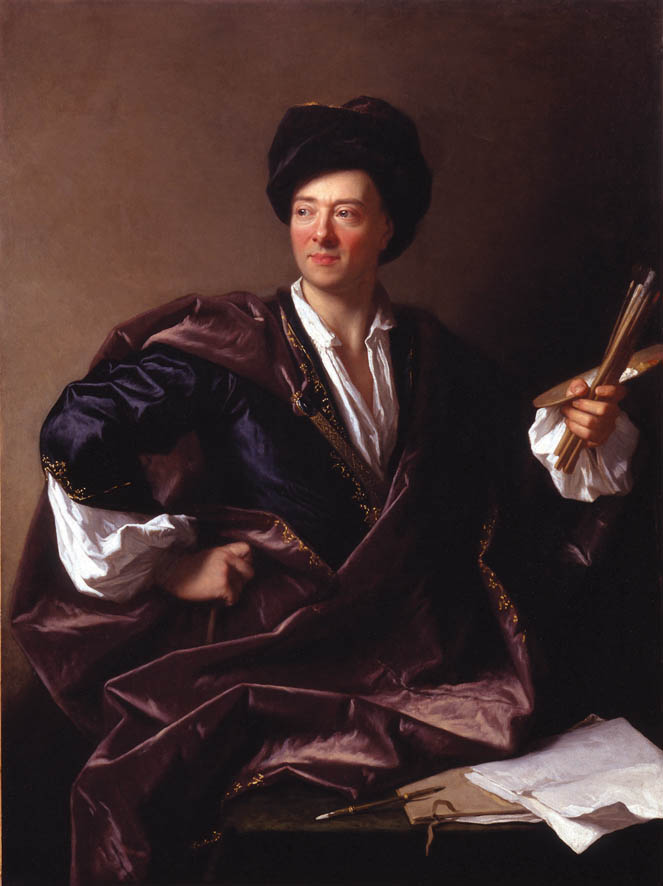
Portrait of the painter François Verdier (1703, Versailles, musée national du château)

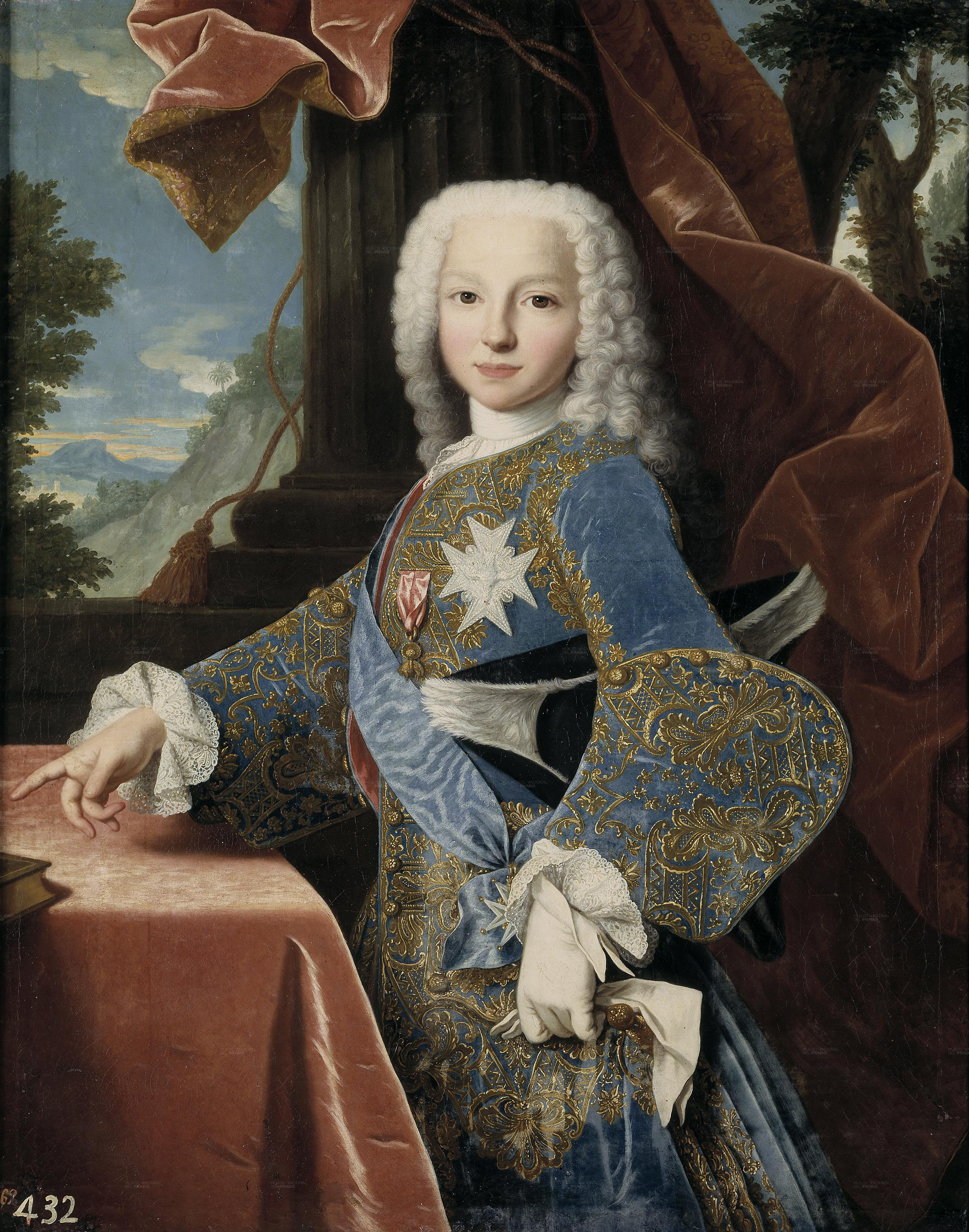
Philip I of Parma as a child

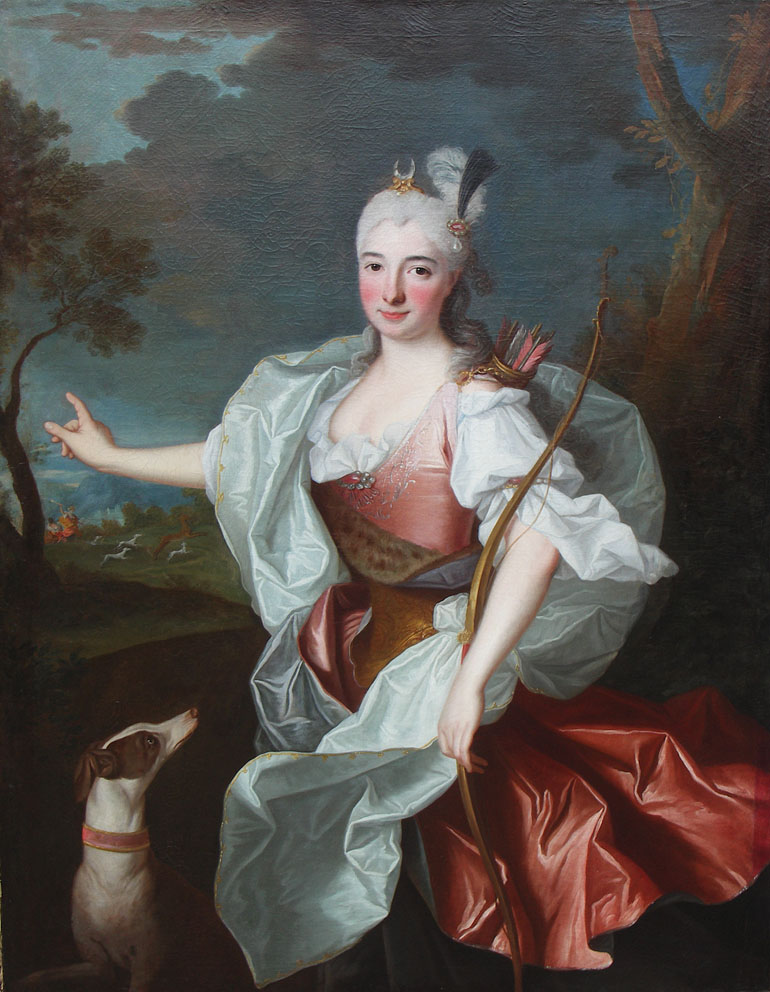
Diana the huntress, in 1715 (private collection)

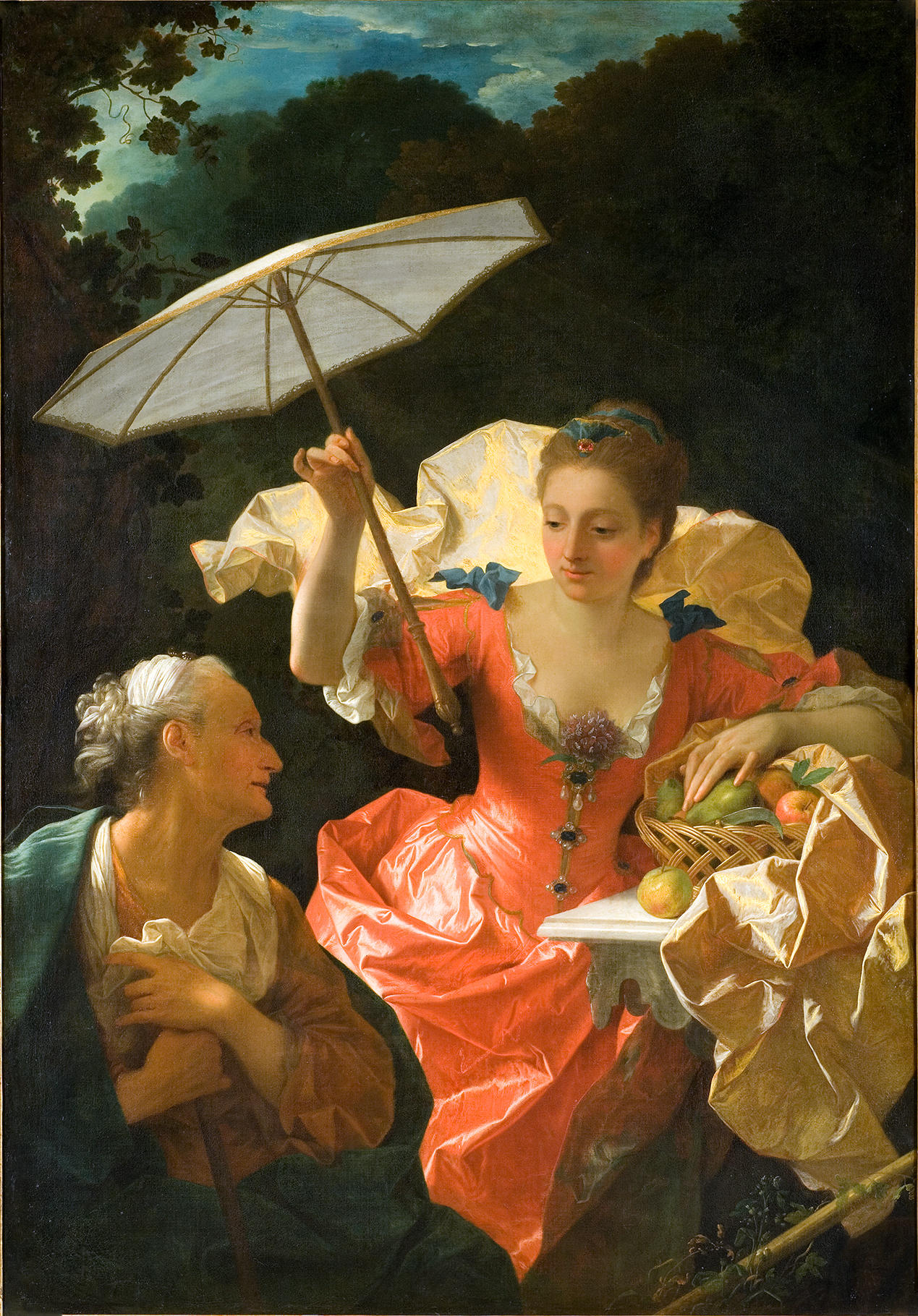
Vertumnus and Pomona (Musée Fabre, Montpellier) – archetype of 18th century Baroque beauty, it may have inspired some of the tapestry cartoons produced by Francisco de Goya, such as The Parasol.

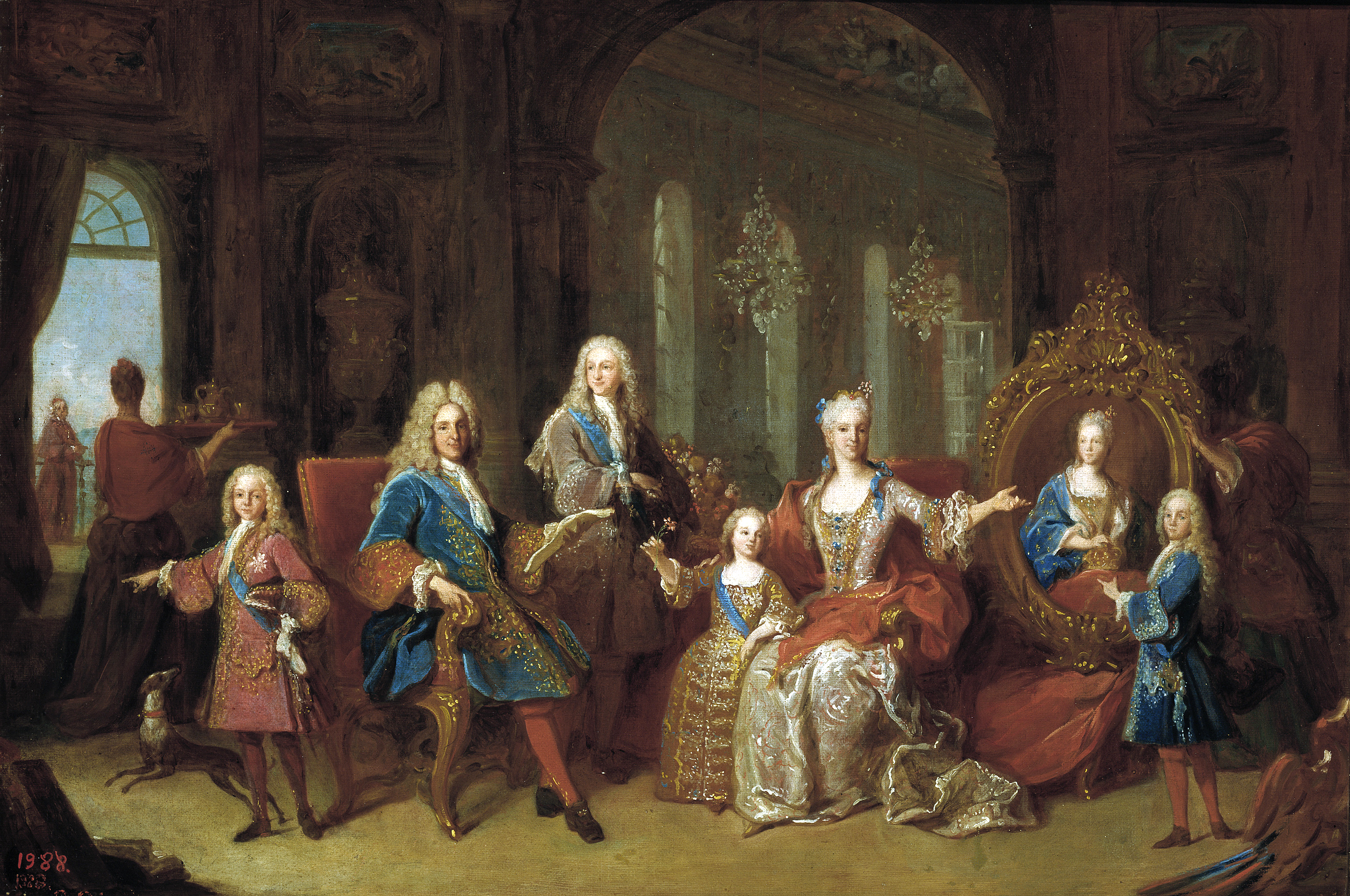
The family of Philip V

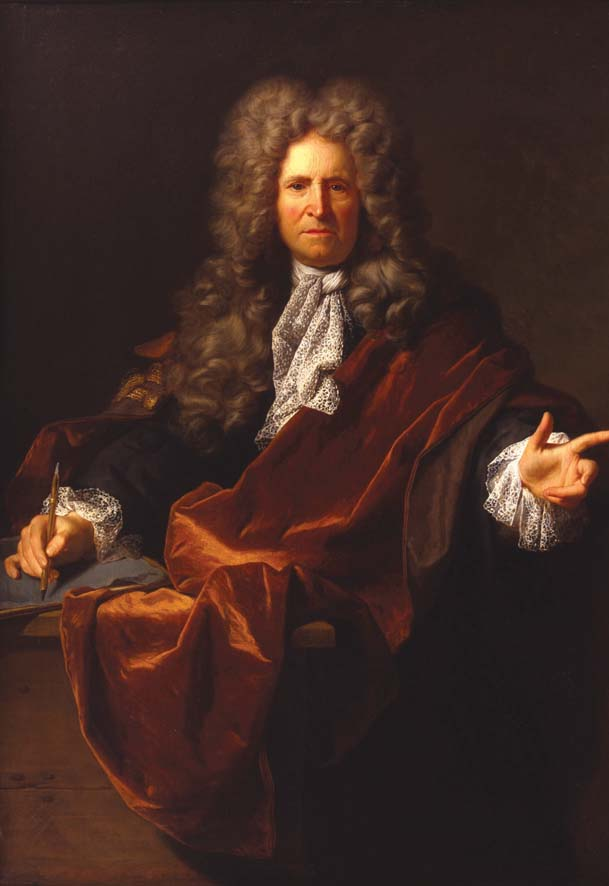
Portrait of the painter Nicolas Van Plattenberg, known as "Platte-Montagne" (1703, Versailles, musée national du château)

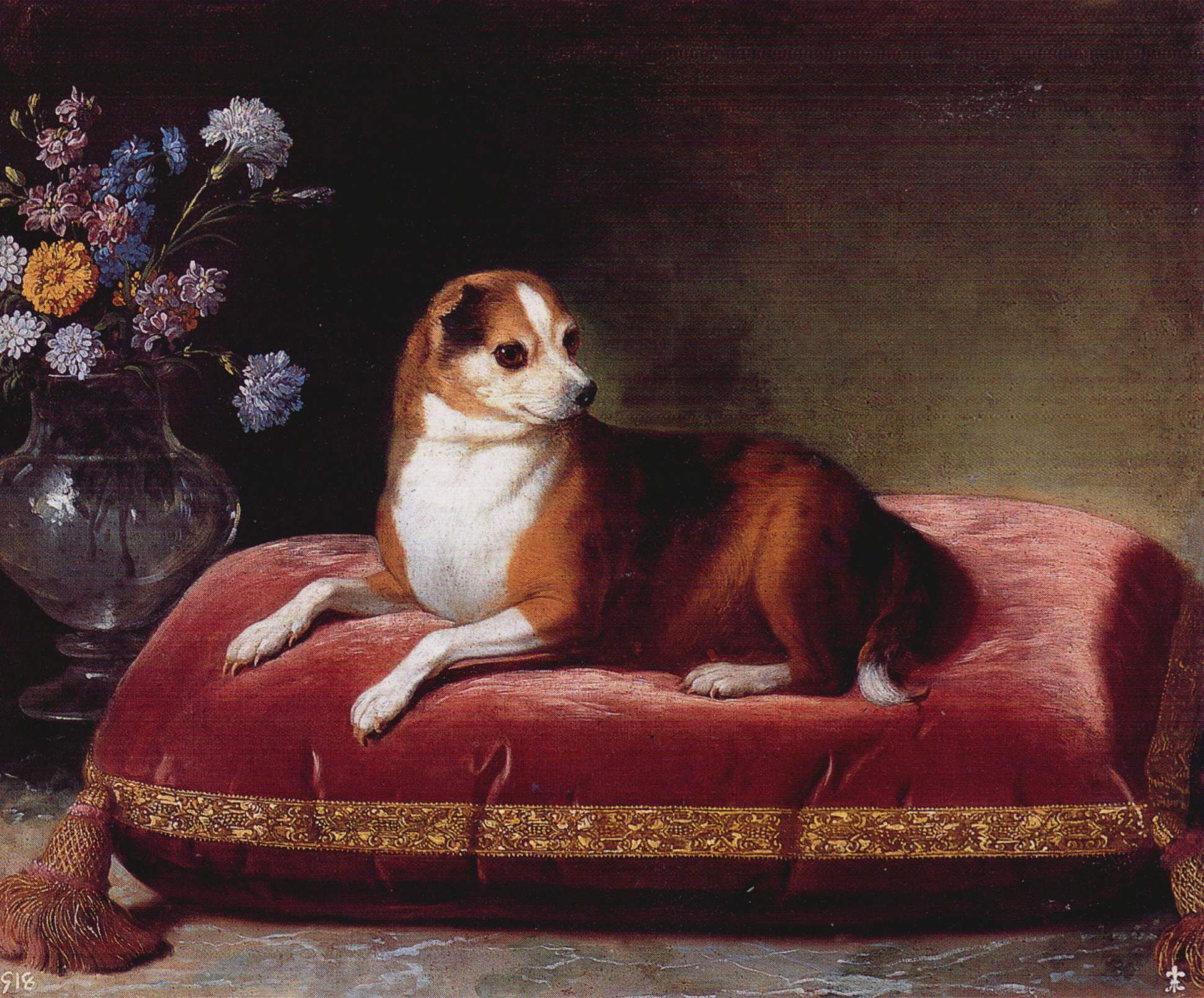
La perra Liceta

== See also ==
- Burning of the Royal Alcázar of Madrid
