= Patrick Sébastien =

French media personality

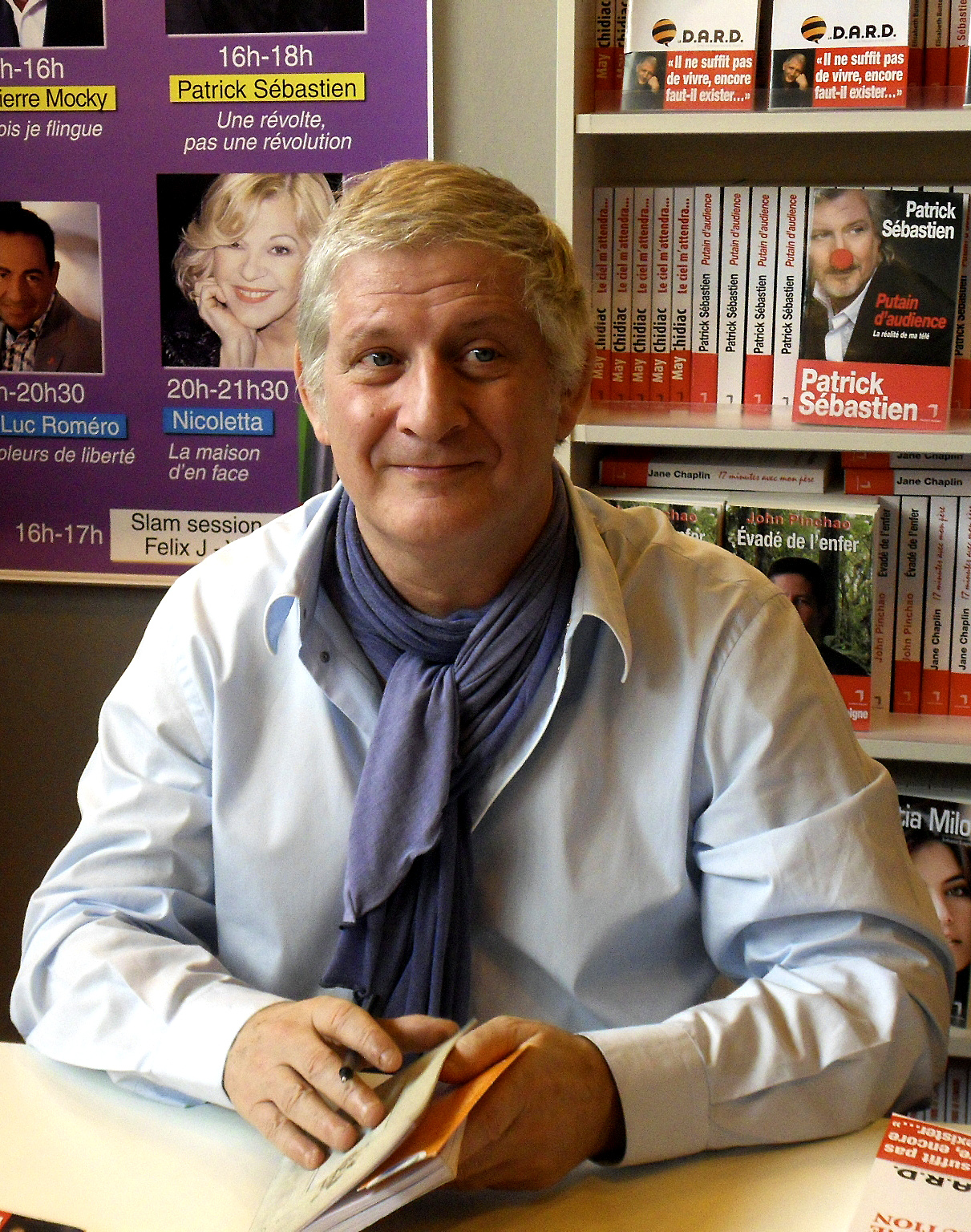
- Born: Patrick Boutot; 14 November 1953 (age 72); Brive-la-Gaillarde, Corrèze, France
- Occupation: Television host

Patrick Boutot (born 14 November 1953), better known as Patrick Sébastien, is a French television host, producer and media personality, radio host, singer, writer, producer, director, impressionist entertainer, comedian, TV and film actor, and former president of the French rugby team CA Brive.

== Discography ==
=== Albums ===
Year	Album	Peak positions	
Year	Album	FRA	BEL (Wa)
1998	Viva bodega!	62	–
2001	Magick Sébastien	28	–
2002	Le roi de la fête	22	–
2004	Bar Academy	34	–
2006	Pochette surprise (Patrick Sébastien et le Coll Orchestre)	18	–
2007	Lâchez-nous les tongs	77	–
2008	Ah... si tu pouvais fermer ta gueule...	20	82
2009	Même pas peur	25	71
2011	Faut qu'on slash!	85	66
2013	À l'attaque	15	38
2014	Ça va être ta fête	4	24
2015	Ça va bouger	21	37
2016	Le Sébastien nouveau est arrivé	50	57
2019	Entre nous	148	—
2023	Putain, c'est génial!	48	105

Compilation albums

Year	Album	Peak positions	
Year	Album	FR	BEL (Wa)
2002	Best Of	–	39
2011	L'indispensable pour faire la fête - Best Of	141	51

=== Singles ===
Year	Single	Peak positions	
Year	Single	FR	BEL (Wa)
1985	"Bonhomme après l'amour?"	22	–
1987	"Pépito"	36	–
1990	"Le gambadou"	3	–
1998	"La fiesta"	7	15 (Ultratop)
1998	"Viva bodega"	66	–
1999	"Le petit bonhomme en mousse"	20	–
2000	"Tourner les serviettes"	49	13 (Ultratip)
2001	"Joyeux anniversaire"	32	–
2001	"C'est chaud"	36	–
2002	"Le kankan"	38	–
2002	"Les pitchounets"	73	–
2002	"Pourvu que ça dure"	29	15 (Ultratip)
2004	"Collés tout collés"	37	–
2005	"Le grand cabaret"	56	–
2006	"Et la pleine lune"	35	–
2006	"Les sardines" (Patrick Sébastien et le Coll Orchestre)	26	–
2007	"La chanson à Élise"	55	–
2008	"Ah... si tu pouvais fermer ta gueule..."	1	–
2009	"On voudrait des sous"	12	–
2013	"C'est bien fait pour ta gueule"	132	–
2014	"Il fait chaud"	144	–

== Filmography ==
Director

- 2000: T'aime
- 2009: La Cellule de Zarkane

Actor

- 1984: Le Pactole as Rousselet
- 1985: Le téléphone sonne toujours deux fois!! as L'aveugle
- 1997: Quatre garçons pleins d'avenir as Georges
- 2000: T'aime as Dr Hugues Michel

== Radio and television ==
- 1984-1987: Carnaval (TF1)
- 1991-1992: Surprise sur prise - co-presented with Marcel Béliveau (TF1)
- 1992: Le Grand Bluff (TF1)
- 1998-2019: Le Plus Grand Cabaret du Monde (France 2)
