= The Family of Philip V (1743) =

Painting by Louis Michel van Loo

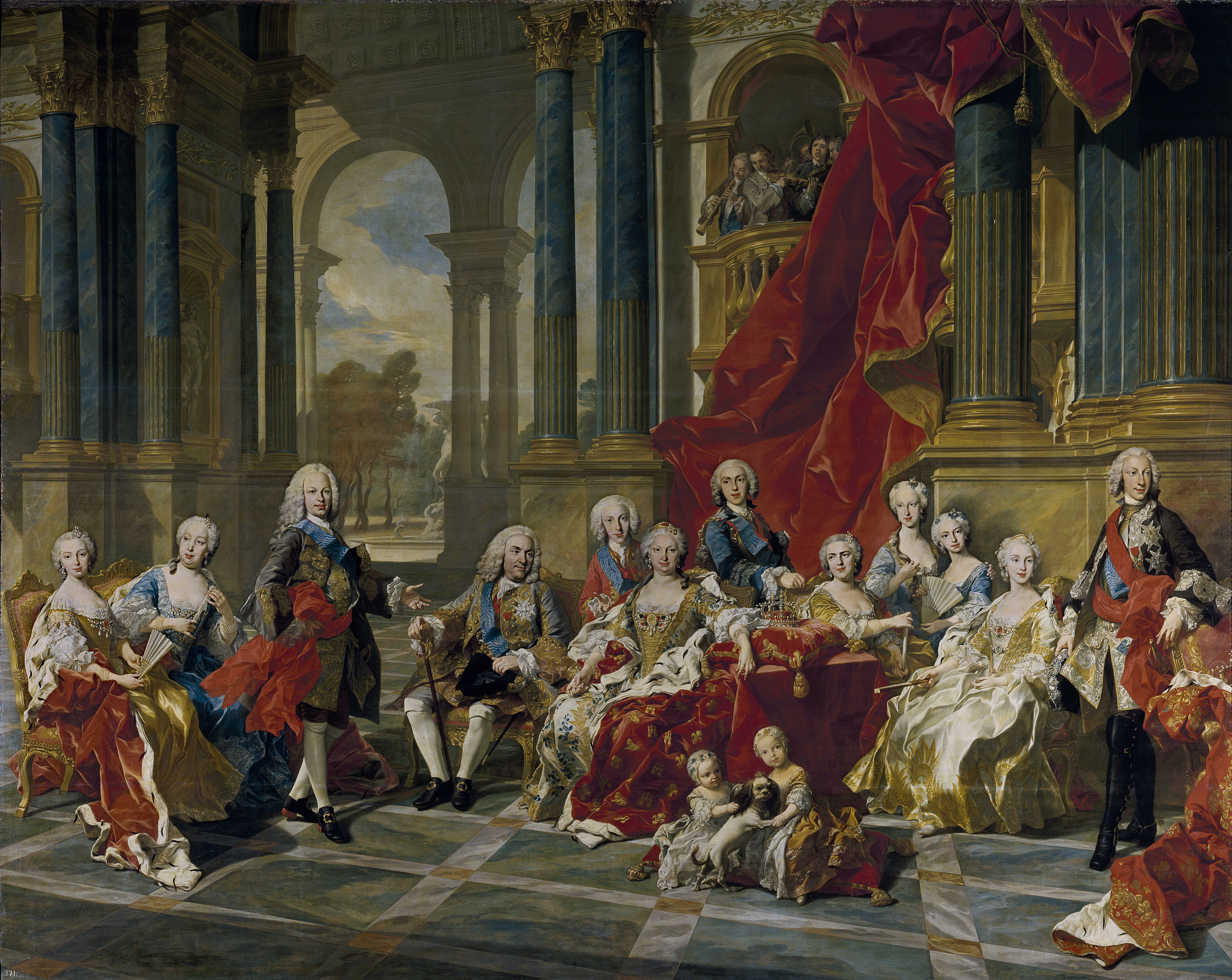
- Artist: Louis-Michel van Loo
- Year: 1743
- Medium: Oil on canvas
- Dimensions: 408 cm × 520 cm (161 in × 200 in)
- Location: Museo del Prado; Madrid

The Family of Philip V is an oil-on-canvas painting by the French artist Louis-Michel van Loo, completed in 1743. It features life-sized depictions of Philip V of Spain and his family. The painting depicts the royal family in a fictional room and is in the style of French baroque and rococo art. The painting is one of a trio of paintings which bear the same name and are dated 1723 by Jean Ranc, a smaller 1738 version and the 1743 rendition.

== Artist ==
Van Loo was a French artist who was born in Toulon in 1701. He trained under his father Jean Baptiste van Loo who, under the patronage of the Prince of Carignan, worked in Rome and Turin. Van Loo became court painter in 1737 having replaced Jean Ranc. He came to the Spanish court of the House of Bourbon in 1737 where he worked till 1752. He was the premier painter to Philip V's son Fernando VI but left Spain in 1757 returning to France. Van Loo, according to critics, was also influenced by Dutch art. Van Loo's younger brother Charles Amédée Philippe van Loo also had a successful career and went on to paint Empress Elizabeth of Russia.

== Description ==
The painting is today held at the Museo del Prado in Madrid. It is an expression of the strength the House of Bourbon brought to the throne with Philip V's succession in 1700. The king, the central male, sits next to his second wife, Elisabeth Farnese. Farnese's arm next to the crown is a symbolic representation of the power she had. Philip V and Maria Luisa's youngest son, Ferdinand, Prince of Asturias, heir to the throne at the time the painting was completed, is to the left of his father. The Princess of Asturias, Barbara of Portugal, sits next to Philip V's eldest daughter Maria Anna Victoria of Spain; she had married Barbara's brother as part of a double marriage between Portugal and Spain in 1729.

The central group includes the children of Philip V and Farnese. Between the king and queen is their youngest son the Cardinal Infante Louis who was later the Count of Chinchón. To the right of the queen is Infante Philip, later Duke of Parma, who stands above his wife Louise Élisabeth of France, Madame Infante, daughter of Louis XV. Below Farnese, Infante Philip and Madame Infante, is Madame Infante’s first child, Infanta Isabella, who would later marry Joseph II, Holy Roman Emperor, and on the left is Maria Amalia’s first child Princess Maria Isabel Ana of Naples and Sicily. The two females standing above Madame Infante are the younger daughter of Philip V and Farnese, the Infanta's Maria Teresa Rafaela and her junior Maria Antonia. Maria Teresa Rafaela would marry Madame Infante's brother Louis, Dauphin of France in 1745 and Maria Antonia Fernanda married the future King of Sardinia in 1750. On the far right is Maria Amalia of Saxony sitting next to her husband Charles, then king of Naples and Sicily and later king of Spain. The couple were in Naples at the time but returned to Spain at the death of Ferdinand VI in 1759.

The wealth of materials depicted in the painting such as jewels, fabrics and the use of bright colours was previously unseen in paintings in Spain which had been traditionally dark and sombre, and was a reference to the Flemish school. Partially hidden by the extensive theatrical red curtain that falls from the roof there is a balcony where a band plays a concert. The royals are in a large room opening onto a garden.

== Sitters ==
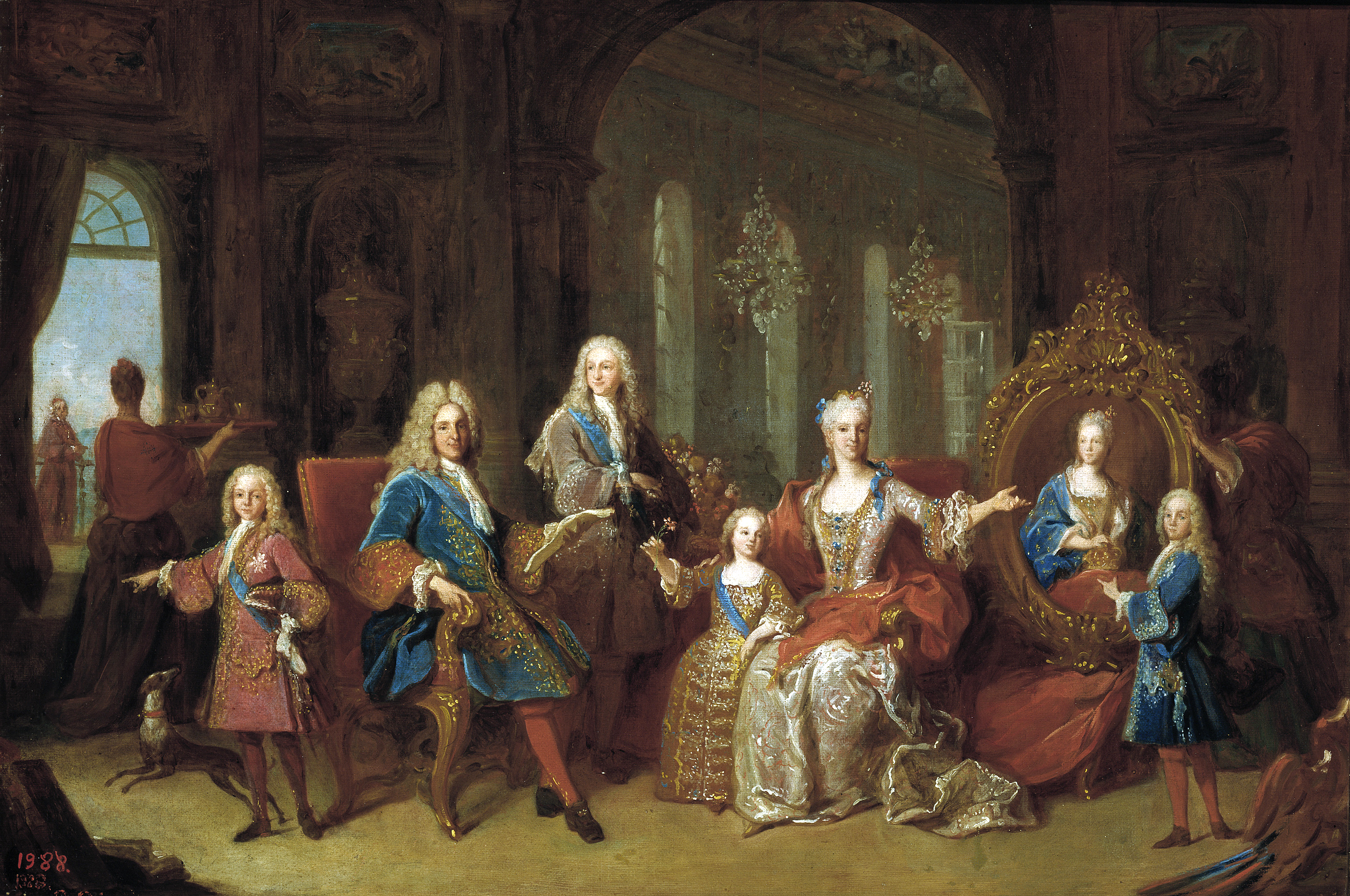
The Family of Philip V in 1723

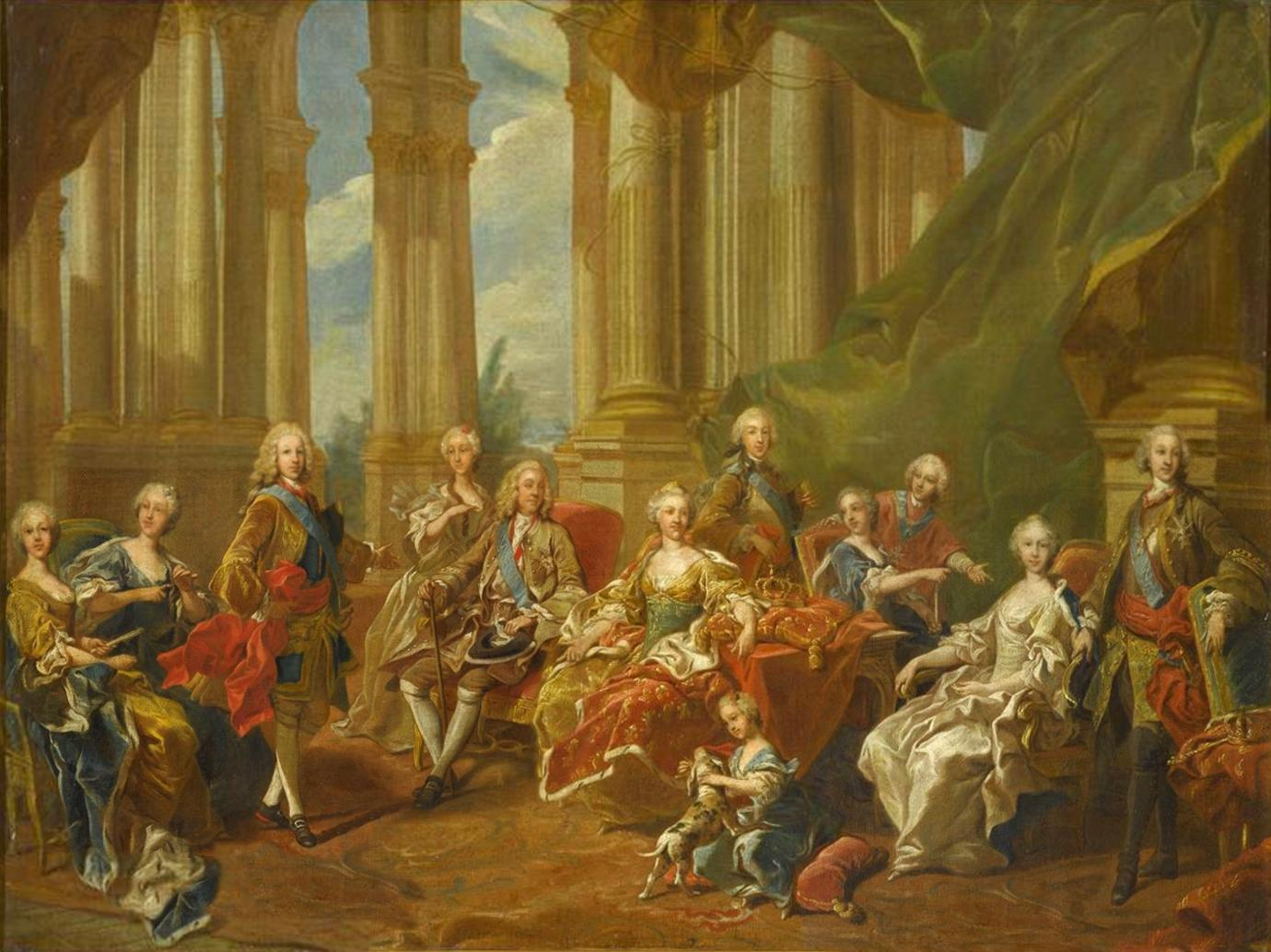
The Family of Philip V in 1738

1. Mariana Victoria of Spain, Princess of Brazil (1718-1781) future queen of Portugal.
2. Barbara of Portugal, Princess of Asturias (1711-1758) future queen of Spain.
3. Ferdinand, Prince of Asturias (1713-1759) future king of Spain.
4. King Philip V (1683-1746)
5. Cardinal Infante Louis (1727-1785) future count of Chinchón.
6. Queen Elisabeth (Isabel) (1692-1766)
7. Infante Philip (1720-1765) future duke of Parma.
8. Louise Élisabeth of France (1727-1759) future duchess of Parma.
9. Infanta Maria Teresa (1726-1746) future dauphine of France.
10. Infanta Maria Antonia (1729-1785) future queen of Sardinia.
11. Maria Amalia of Saxony (1724-1760) future queen of Spain.
12. Infanta Isabella (1741-1763) future archduchess of Austria.
13. Princess Maria Isabel Ana of Naples and Sicily (1743-1749) died in childhood.
14. Charles, King of Naples (1716-1788) future king of Spain.
