= Family of Philip V (1738) =

Painting by Louis Michel van Loo

The Family of Philip V
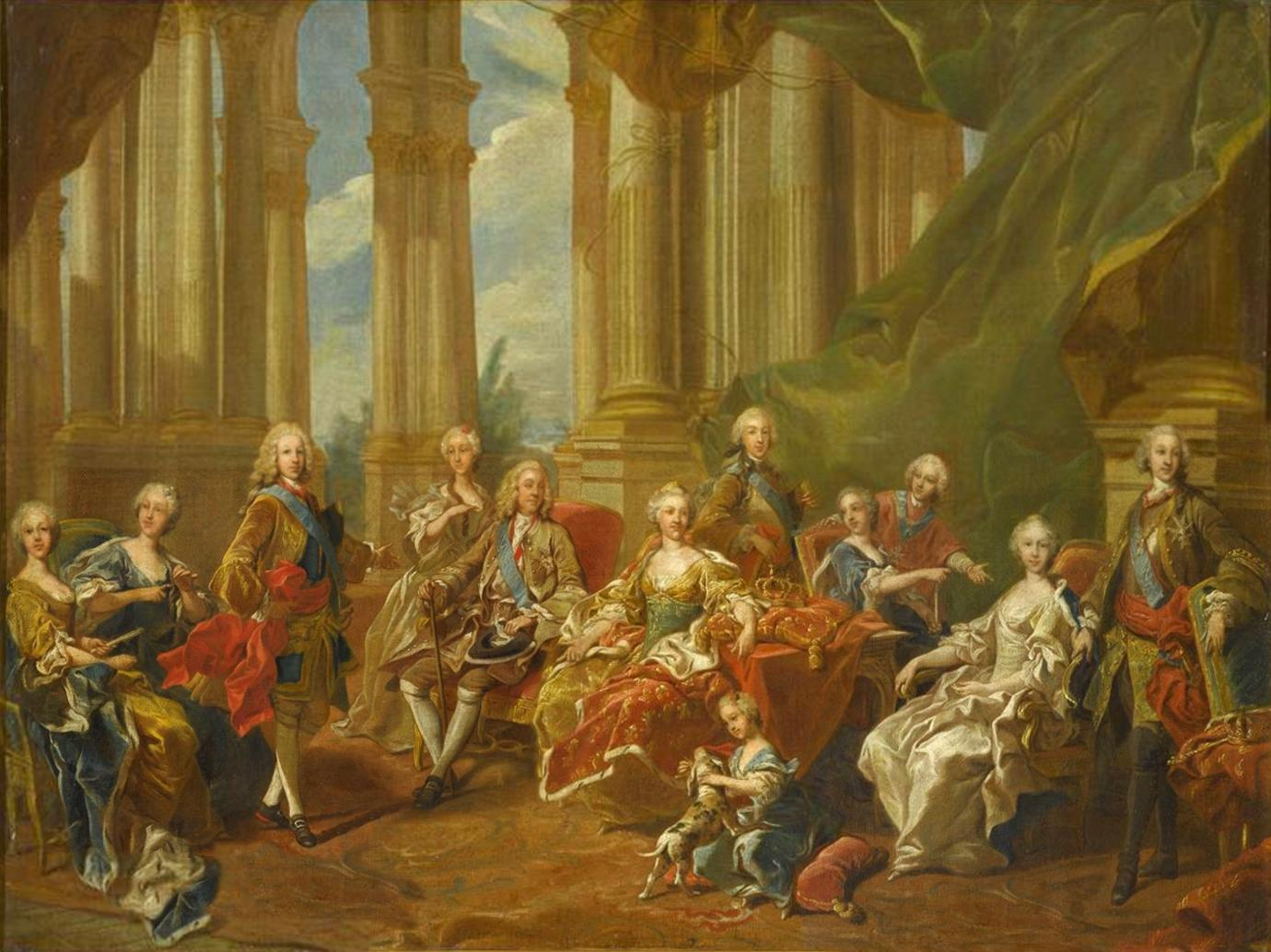
- Artist: Louis-Michel van Loo
- Year: 1738
- Dimensions: 408 cm × 520 cm (161 in × 200 in)
- Location: Museo del Prado; Madrid

The Family of Philip V is an oil on canvas by the French artist Louis-Michel van Loo completed in 1738. It depicts the royal family in a fictional room, and is in the style of French, baroque and rococo art. The painting is one of a trio of paintings which bear the same name and are dated 1723 by Jean Ranc, a smaller 1738 version and the 1743 rendition.

== Artist ==
Van Loo was a French artist who was born in Toulon in 1701. He trained under his father Jean Baptiste van Loo who, under the patronage of the Prince of Carignan, worked in Rome and Turin. Van Loo became court painter in 1737 having replaced Jean Ranc. He came to the Spanish court of the House of Bourbon in 1737 where he worked till 1752. He was the premier painter to Philip V's son Ferdinand VI but left Spain in 1757 returning to France. Van Loo, according to critics, was also influenced by Dutch art. Van Loo's younger brother Charles Amédée Philippe van Loo also had a successful career and went on to paint Empress Elizabeth of Russia.

== Description ==
The painting is today held at the Museo del Prado in Madrid. In the center, is Philip V, next to Philip is his Italian wife, Elisabeth Farnese. On the left of Philip is Louise-Élisabeth of France, nicknamed Madame Infante, future Duchess of Parma, who at the time wasn't in Spain. On the right of Farnese is Infante Philip, who was later future Duke of Parma. On the left of Madame Infante is Philip V's last son with his first wife, Maria Luisa Gabriella of Savoy is Ferdinand, Prince of Asturias and behind Ferdinand is his wife, Barbara of Portugal, Princess of Asturias and next to Barbara is Farnese's eldest daughter Mariana Victoria, who would be the future Queen of Portugal. On the right of Philip is Infanta Maria Teresa Rafaela and Infante Luis who would later become Dauphine of France via marriage to Louis, Dauphin of France and Count of Chinchón. Next to Luis is Charles VII of Naples, and on the bottom of Charles is his wife, Maria Amalia of Saxony. Below Farnese is her last child, Infanta Maria Antonia Ferdinanda, who would later become Queen of Sardinia. The green cloth covering some structures may mean that it is still in construction or style. The royals are in a large room opening onto a garden.

== Sitters ==
1. Mariana Victoria of Spain, future Queen consort of Portugal.
2. Barbara of Portugal, future Queen consort of Spain.
3. Ferdinand, Prince of Asturias future Ferdinand VI
4. Louise-Élisabeth of France, Madame Infante, future Duchess of Parma.
5. Philip V of Spain
6. Elisabeth Farnese
7. Infante Philip of Spain, future Duke of Parma.
8. Maria Antonia Ferdinanda, future Queen consort of Sardinia.
9. Maria Teresa Rafaela of Spain, future Dauphine of France.
10. Infante Luis of Spain, future Count of Chinchón.
11. Maria Amalia of Saxony, future Queen of Spain.
12. Charles VII of Naples, future Charles III of Spain
