= The Family of Philip V (1723) =

Painting by Jean Ranc

The Family of Felipe V
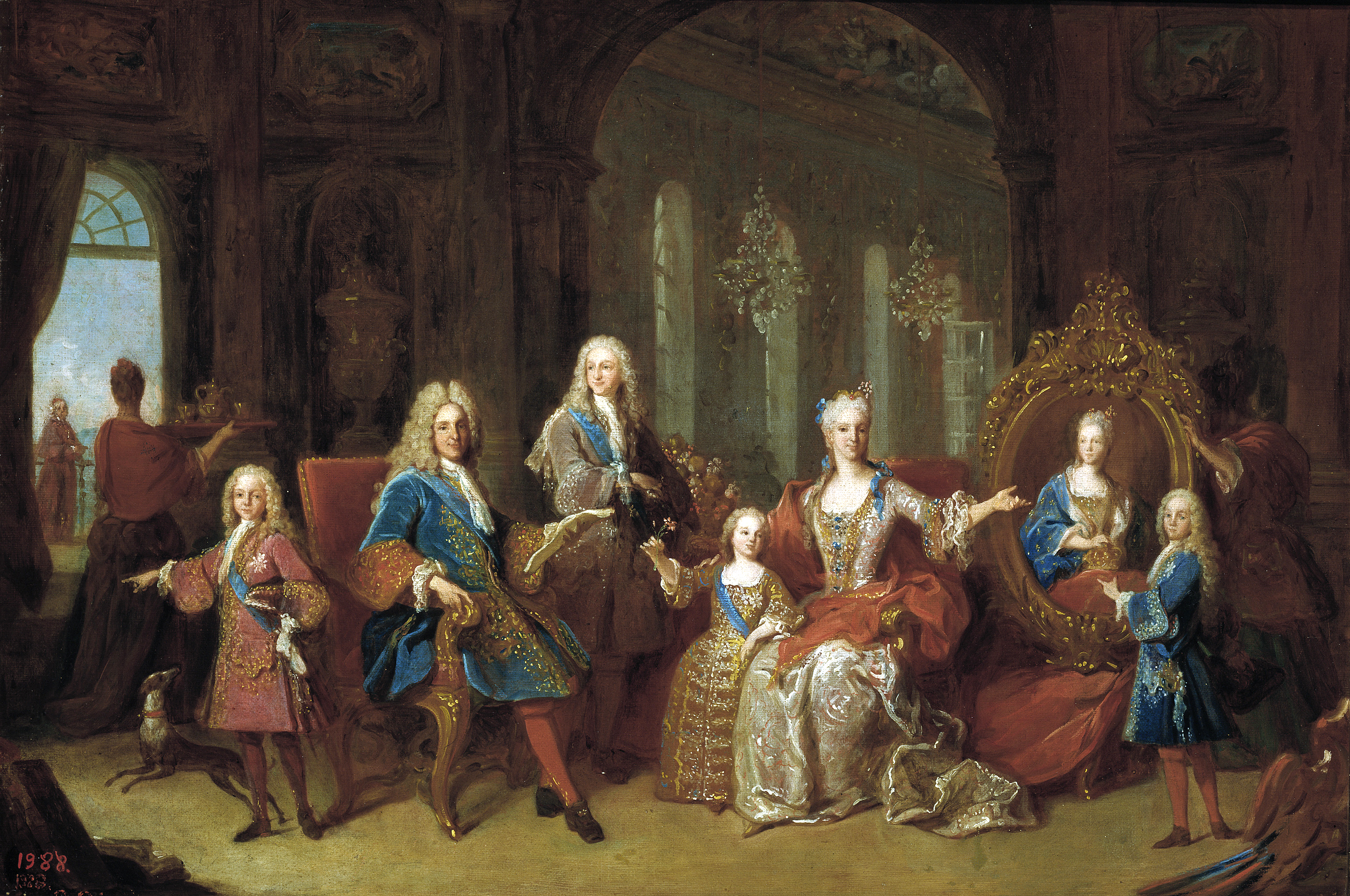
- Artist: Jean Ranc
- Year: 1723
- Medium: Oil on canvas
- Dimensions: 44 cm × 65 cm (17 in × 26 in)
- Location: Museo del Prado; Madrid

The Family of Felipe V is an oil on canvas painting by the French artist Jean Ranc completed in 1723. It features depictions of Philip V of Spain and his family. The painting is one of a trio of paintings that bear the same name; the other two are by Louis Michel van Loo and are dated 1738 and (a larger version) 1743.

== The artist ==
Ranc was a French painter, mainly active in portraiture. He trained under his father Antoine Ranc and his father's former student Hyacinthe Rigaud. He served at the courts of both Louis XV of France and Philip V of Spain. He was active at the Spanish court from 1723 and painted King Felipe V as well as his eight surviving children. Ranc was subsequently replaced by Louis Michel van Loo as court painter and it was he who painted the Spanish royal family in 1738 and 1743.

== The painting ==
Ranc's 1723 painting of Felipe V of Spain depicts his five eldest surviving children. The king is sat between his two eldest sons, Infante Luis, Prince of Asturias and Infante Fernando by his first wife Maria Luisa of Savoy. Felipe V's first wife died in 1714 and he remarried later the same year to Isabel Farnese. His second wife was the mother of the three other children depicted in the painting. Infante Felipe, future Duke of Parma, aged three at the time of the painting is stood between his parents and holds a yellow flower. An oval painting shows Infanta Mariana Victoria, fiancée of Louis XV, who was residing in France at the time. On the immediate right is Infante Carlos future King of Spain.

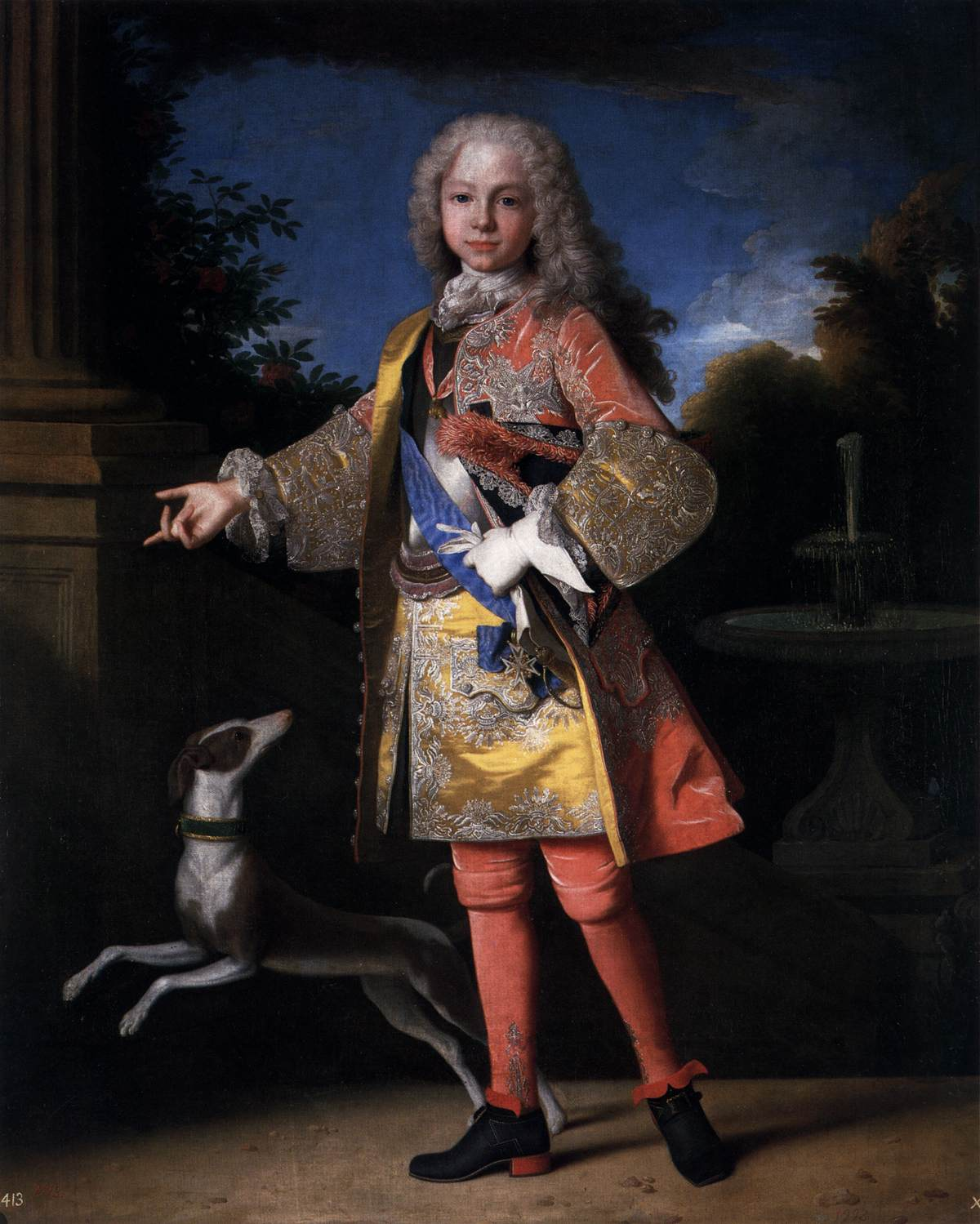
Infante Fernando by Jean Ranc

The background of the painting is a large room reminiscent of the Hall of Mirrors at Versailles, incidentally where Felipe V was born in 1683. Domestic staff are also shown going about their daily chores. In the distance is a monk, possibly a reference to Felipe V's religious mania which stayed with him all his life. The males in the painting all wear the blue sashes of the Order of the Holy Spirit. Infante Fernando, stood over a dog was subsequently painting individually by Ranc, a painting which is also conserved at the Prado.

== The sitters ==
1. Infante Fernando of Spain (1713-1759) future King of Spain.
2. King Felipe V (1683-1746)
3. Infante Luis of Spain, Prince of Asturias (1707-1724) future King of Spain.
4. Infante Felipe of Spain (1720-1765) future Duke of Parma.
5. Isabel Farnesio (1692-1766) Queen of Spain.
6. Infante Carlos of Spain (1716-1788) future King of Spain.
7. Infanta Mariana Victoria of Spain (1718-1781) fiancée of Louis XV of France, future Queen of Portugal.
