= Pescatori =

Pescatori is an Italian surname. Notable people with the surname include:

- Christian Pescatori (born 1971), Italian racing driver
- Laura Pescatori (fl. 1736), favorite of the Spanish queen Elisabeth Farnese
- Max Pescatori (born 1971), Italian poker player
