= María de las Nieves =

María de las Nieves Angulo y Arbizu, la marquesa de las Nieves, was a Spanish marchioness and courtier. She is known as the favorite of the Queen of Spain, Elisabeth Farnese.

== Life ==
María de las Nieves was born to the nobleman Juan de Angulo, Secretario del Despacho Universal, and Manuela de Albizu y Villamayor, III marchesa de Villamayor. She married José de Feloaga y Vargas, 3rd marquess of Navahermosa. She had no children.

She served as the Aya (royal governess) to the Infanta Mariana Victoria of Spain. She accompanied Mariana Victoria to France and lived with her at the French royal court during Mariana Victoria's tenure as the Infante Reine and fiancée of Louis XV between 1721 and 1725.

When the betrothal between Louis XV and Mariana Victoria was broken, she accompanied Mariana Victoria back to Spain, reprtedly bringing with her nothing but a hatred of the French. Upon her return, the king of Spain created the title Marquess de Las Nieves for her (1725). She was appointed Aya for the younger Infanta, Maria Teresa Rafaela of Spain, who was born in 1726.

María de las Nieves is known as the favorite of Queen Elisabeth Farnese. After the queen's favorites La Pellegrina left court to marry and the duchess de Saint-Pierre was exiled to France in 1727, Las Nieves emerged the queen's new female favorite. She was described as ill-tempered and with a great dislike of both France and Portugal. She entertained the queen with regular reports about gossip and information about scandals from Madrid as well as from the rest of Spain. The queen reserved special hours for her information reports, which gave Las Nieves opportunity to recommend supplicant and individuals to the queen. When the queen's main female favorite Laura Pescatori finally lost her influence in 1736, Las Nieves replaced her as the main channel for supplicants to the queen.

She was childless, and left her title Marquess de Las Nieves to her niece María de la Concepción de Medrano y Luján (28 January 1744 – 1 January 1798).
