= Marguerite-Therese Colbert =

Marguerite-Therese Colbert de Croissy, duchesse de Saint-Pierre (1682–1769), was a French-Spanish courtier. She is known as the favorite of the Queen of Spain, Elisabeth Farnese.

== Life ==
Marguerite-Therese Colbert de Croissy was born to Charles Colbert de Croissy and Françoise Béraud, and the niece of Jean-Baptiste Colbert. In 1701 she married Louis IV de Clermont d'Amboise, marquis de Reynel (died 1702), and in 1704 she married secondly to François Marie Spinola, duc de Saint-Pierre, grand d’Espagne, chevalier de l'ordre du Saint-Esprit (1659–1727).

Marguerite-Therese Colbert is known as the favorite of Queen Elisabeth Farnese. She and her second spouse lived in Spain and attended the Spanish royal court, and the duchesse de Saint-Pierre became the personal friend and confidante of Elisabeth Farnese, after Farnese became queen in 1714. The duchesse de Saint-Pierre is described as witty and vivacious beauty, and her lighthearted French conversation was said to brighten the stiff Spanish court, which during the reign of Philip V was described as quite boring and lacking much of a social life. She is also described as the personal friend and confidante of the queen, as one of the queen's most prominent and influential favorites after Laura Pescatori, alongside the queen's lady's maid La Pellegrina. Her position was noted when he crown princess, Louise Élisabeth d'Orléans, refused to allow the duchess to kiss her hand, which caused a conflict between the queen and her daughter-in-law.

In 1727 the duchesse de Saint-Pierre was widowed a second time. Described as a still very beautiful and now independently wealthy widow, she caused a scandal by entering in to a relationship with the twenty years younger French count de Forcalquier, a scandal that caused her to be exiled back to France. In France she participated in the high society life of Paris, continued to live in a relationship with her lover the count de Forcalquier, and became a friend of Émilie du Châtelet. This was noted by contemporary chroniclers:

"...One son, the comte de Forcalquier, had an older woman as a mistress, Marguerite Therese Colbert de Croissy---niece of Colbert, the very capable first minister to Louis XIV,and now duchesse de Saint-Pierre---became Du Chatelet's most frequent companion."
"This lady, recently widowed from a much older Spanish nobleman, was a young-looking fifty-three and most determined to make up for time lost in the stifling atmosphere of the Spanish court where she had lived under the jealous surveillance of her husband since 1704. The merry widow began taking the 23-year-old comte de Forcalquier as her lover, and the three of them painted the town red with all the decorum of their station and condition. . . . "
"Du Chatelet felt at home in these surroundings, and the duchesse de Saint-Pierre was a generous friend. She had married first a marquis and then, when he died, the duc de Saint-Pierre. Widowed for the second time in 1727, when she was in her late forties, she had money, rank, and thus independence. Madame de Grandigny described the duchesse during this period of her life as 'silly, but a good woman, kind, gay, loving of every kind of pleasure.'. . . ."

She kept in contact with the queen of Spain via letters, and is said to have entertained the cardinal de Fleury by reading him the letters from the queen. She was succeeded in her position as the queen's favorite was María de las Nieves.
