= Laura Pescatori =

Favorite confidant of Queen Elisabeth Farnese

Laura Pescatori (fl. 1714–1736) was an influential favorite of the queen of Spain, Elisabeth Farnese. Originally the nurse of the queen, she became known as the favorite confidante of the queen as she wielded influence as a channel to the queen. She was courted by foreign diplomats, and was reportedly behind the fall of Cardinal Alberoni.

== Early years ==
Laura Pescatori was Elisabeth Farnese's nurse during her childhood in Parma.

She did not accompany her in her retinue when Elisabeth left Italy for her marriage to King Philip V of Spain in 1714. In Spain, Elisabeth quickly became the de facto ruler through the king and by the guidance of the Parmese ambassador, Cardinal Alberoni.

During the first pregnancy of Queen Elisabeth, the Duke of Parma consented to send Laura Pescatori to Elisabeth to superintend her first confinement.

== Early years in Spain ==
Laura Pescatori arrived to Spain in September 1715. The queen had promised Alberoni that Pescatori would not be allowed to exert any influence upon the affairs of state.

Pescatori was immediately noted to have a great influence upon the queen. She was described as jovial and good natured and at first did not seem to use her influence for other than menial matters.

She brought with her a daughter, whom she married to the adventurer count Cucurani.

== Criticism of Pescatori ==
Alberoni, however, soon complained about her influence and viewed it as a threat to the queen's reputation and position, and thereby his own power position. He accused her of greed and of trying to undermine his position as the queen's adviser by keeping the queen idle.

Pescatori, in collaboration with the queen's confidante Countess Somaglia, acted as a medium of communication between the queen and her former chaplain Maggiali, who she wished to bring to court, a wish Alberoni opposed as she was reputed to be in love with Maggiali.

Laura Pescatori, however, helped the queen secure a stronger power base by assisting her in creating a net of clients by handing out favors.

Funds were raised to finance the return of Pescatori to Parma, but the queen continued to postpone it.

== Later years ==
Laura Pescatori joined in the opposition to Cardinal Alberoni and was instrumental to his fall in 1719. She was inclined to benefit France, and the French ambassador therefore courted her through her son-in-law.

In 1721, the conflict between her and Marquis Scotti, another Italian confidant of the queen, which was demonstrated through arguments in the presence of the queen, resulted in Scotti almost being sent back to Italy.

She was promoted to the post of the queen's zafaja. This meant that she could give visitors access to the queen and that she handled the secret correspondence of the queen, and apparently accepted bribes from foreign diplomats. The king treated her with respect, and the queen told the court to put up with her temper, as she had to do so herself.

In 1736, a plot was suspected against minister Patino created by a cabal consisting of Minister Montijo, the Italian doctor Cervi, Marquis Scotti, Laura Pescatori and her protege Campo Florido. In the same year, however, the influence of Pescatori upon the queen appears to have deteriorated in favor of the Marchioness Las Nieves, who became the most noted female friend of the queen since the departure of the Duchess of S:t Pierre and the marriage of La Pellegrina, who had the task of regularly informing the queen of gossip and who by 1736 was said to be the one who should be courted for supplicants to the queen.
