= Maria Teresa Rafaela of Spain =

Maria Teresa
- Dauphine of France
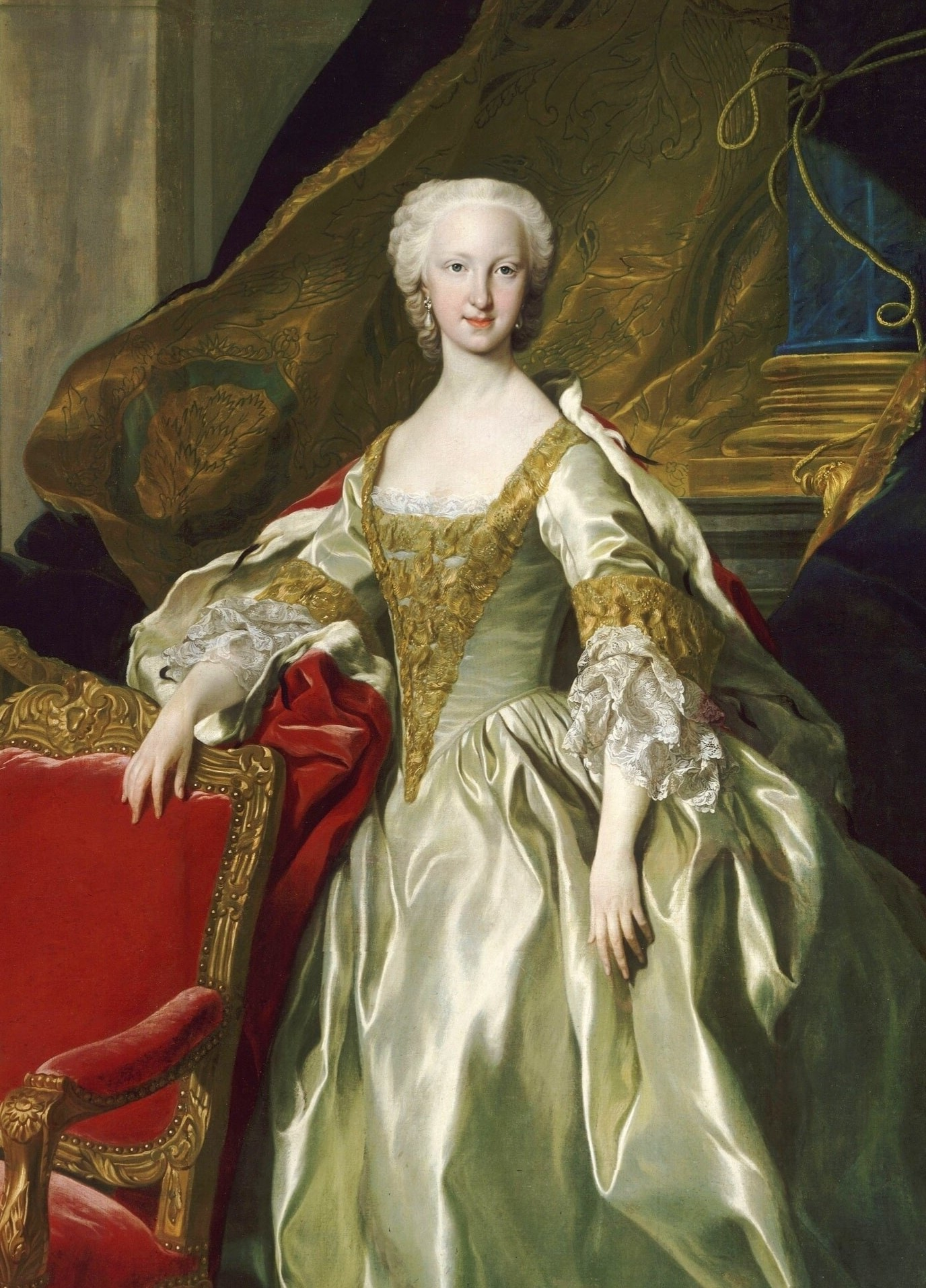
- Portrait by Louis-Michel van Loo, c. 1745
- Born: 11 June 1726; Royal Alcazar of Madrid, Spain
- Died: 22 July 1746 (aged 20); Palace of Versailles, Kingdom of France
- Burial: 6 August 1746; Basilica of Saint-Denis, France
- Spouse: Louis, Dauphin of France (m. 1744)
- Issue: Marie Thérèse of France
Names
- Spanish: María Teresa Antonia Rafaela de Borbón y Farnesio; French: Marie-Thérèse Antoinette Raphaëlle de Bourbon
- House: Bourbon-Anjou
- Father: Philip V of Spain
- Mother: Elisabeth Farnese
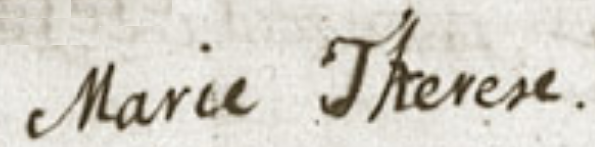
- Signature

Maria Teresa Rafaela of Spain, Dauphine of France (Maria Teresa Antonia Rafaela; 11 June 1726 – 22 July 1746), was the daughter of King Philip V of Spain and Elisabeth Farnese and the wife of Louis, Dauphin of France, son of King Louis XV and Queen Marie Leszczyńska. The Dauphine died aged 20, three days after giving birth to a daughter who died in 1748.

== Infanta of Spain ==
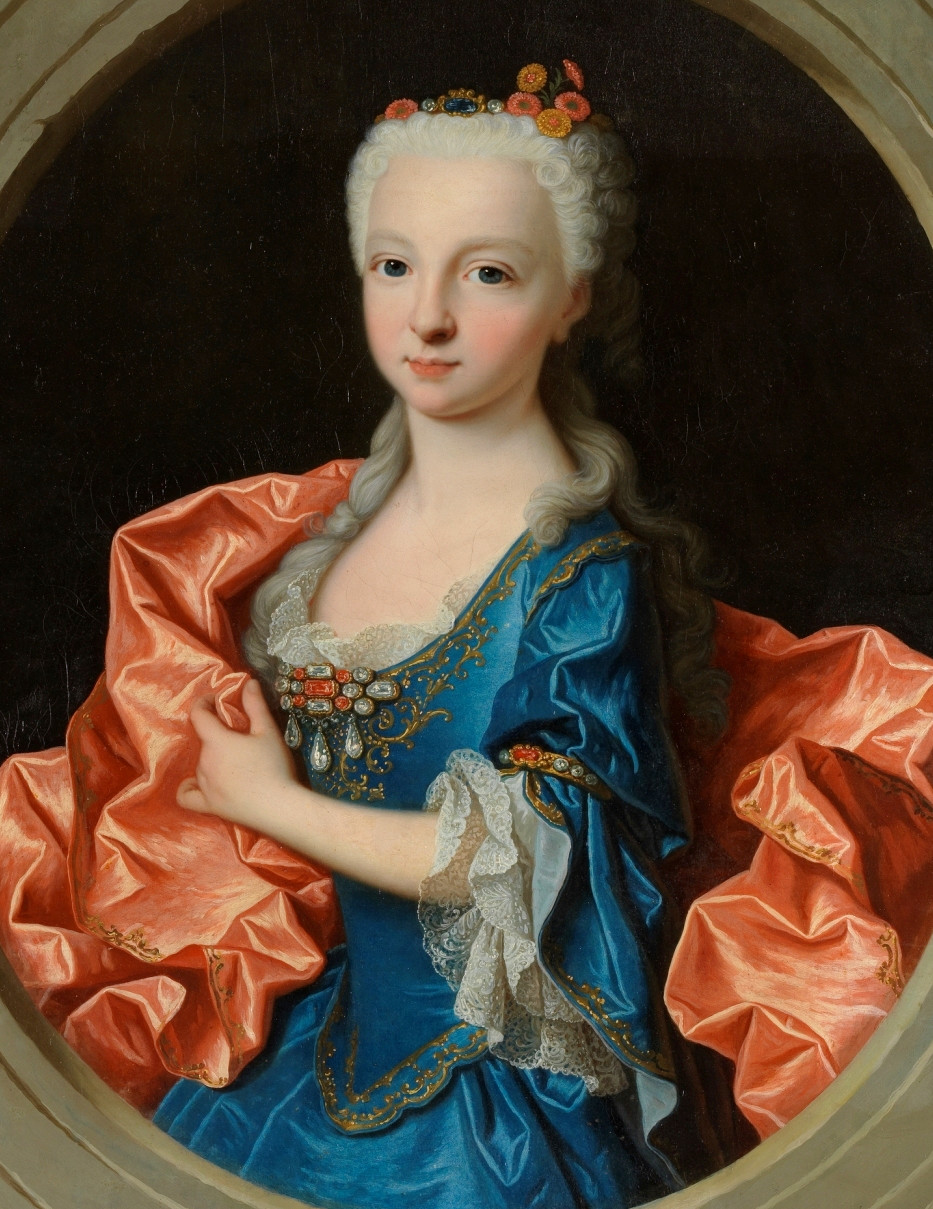
Portrait of the young infanta at the age of five, c. 1731

Born at the Royal Alcazar of Madrid in Spain, she was the second daughter of King Philip V of Spain and Queen Elisabeth Farnese. Baptised María Teresa Antonia Rafaela she was an Infanta of Spain (infanta de España) by birth and was granted the style of address of Royal Highness. She was known as María Teresa Rafaela, though sometimes just referred to as Maria Teresa.

Prior to her marriage, the Spanish and French royal courts had been on poor terms: the Spanish had been greatly insulted by the French in 1725 when the engagement between Louis XV and Infanta Mariana Victoria of Spain, elder sister of Maria Teresa, was broken off. Louis XV had instead married Marie Leszczyńska and by her fathered the Dauphin, Louis. The marriage between the Infanta María Teresa Rafaela and the Dauphin was announced in August 1739 after the marriage of Louise-Élisabeth of France (sister of the Dauphin) and Infante Felipe of Spain (brother of María Teresa Rafaela) the same month. Under the influence of her mother Elisabeth Farnese, María Teresa Rafaela was not to go to France until she reached a more mature age. She was raised under the supervision of her Aya, María de las Nieves.

== Dauphine of France ==
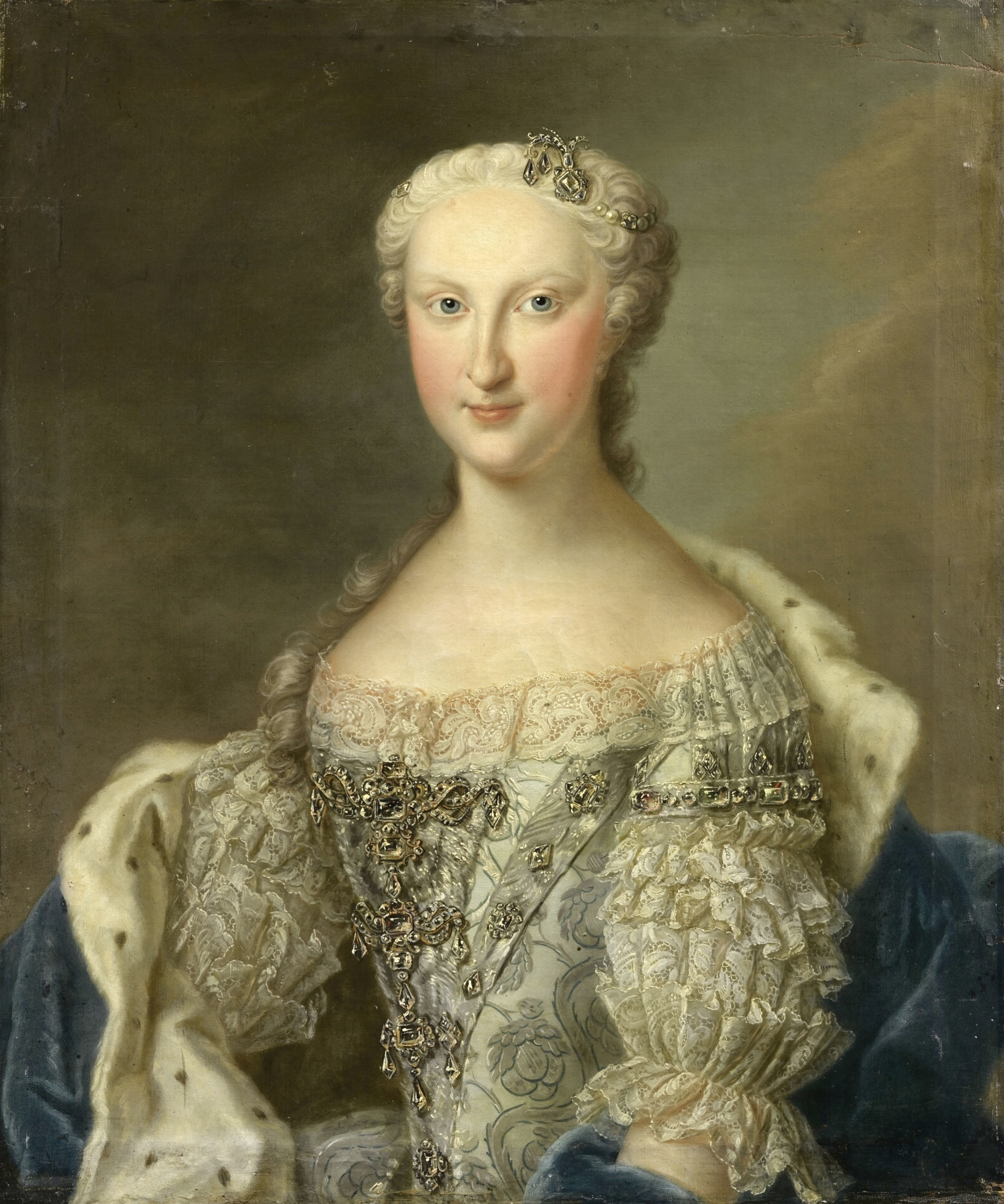
Portrait of Marie Thérèse Raphaëlle c. 1745 by Daniel Klein the younger

The Infanta was married to the Dauphin by proxy in Madrid on 18 December 1744 and departed Spain in January 1745. She arrived at Versailles on 21 February 1745. The official marriage took place at the Palace of Versailles on 23 February 1745 and was performed by the Cardinal de Rohan. In France she was known as Marie Thérèse Raphaëlle d'Espagne or de Bourbon. Addressed as Madame la Dauphine at Versailles, Maria Teresa Rafaela was the highest ranking female in the kingdom after Queen Marie. She was the first Dauphine since the 1712 death of Marie Adélaïde of Savoy. On 24 February the Yew Tree Ball was held in honor of the newlyweds. The event also marked the arrival of Madame de Pompadour at Versailles. The ball was attended by the King, the Queen, Madame Henriette, Madame Adélaïde; the Duchess of Chartres, the Dowager Princess of Conti and the Duchess of Modena along with other princesses of the Blood.

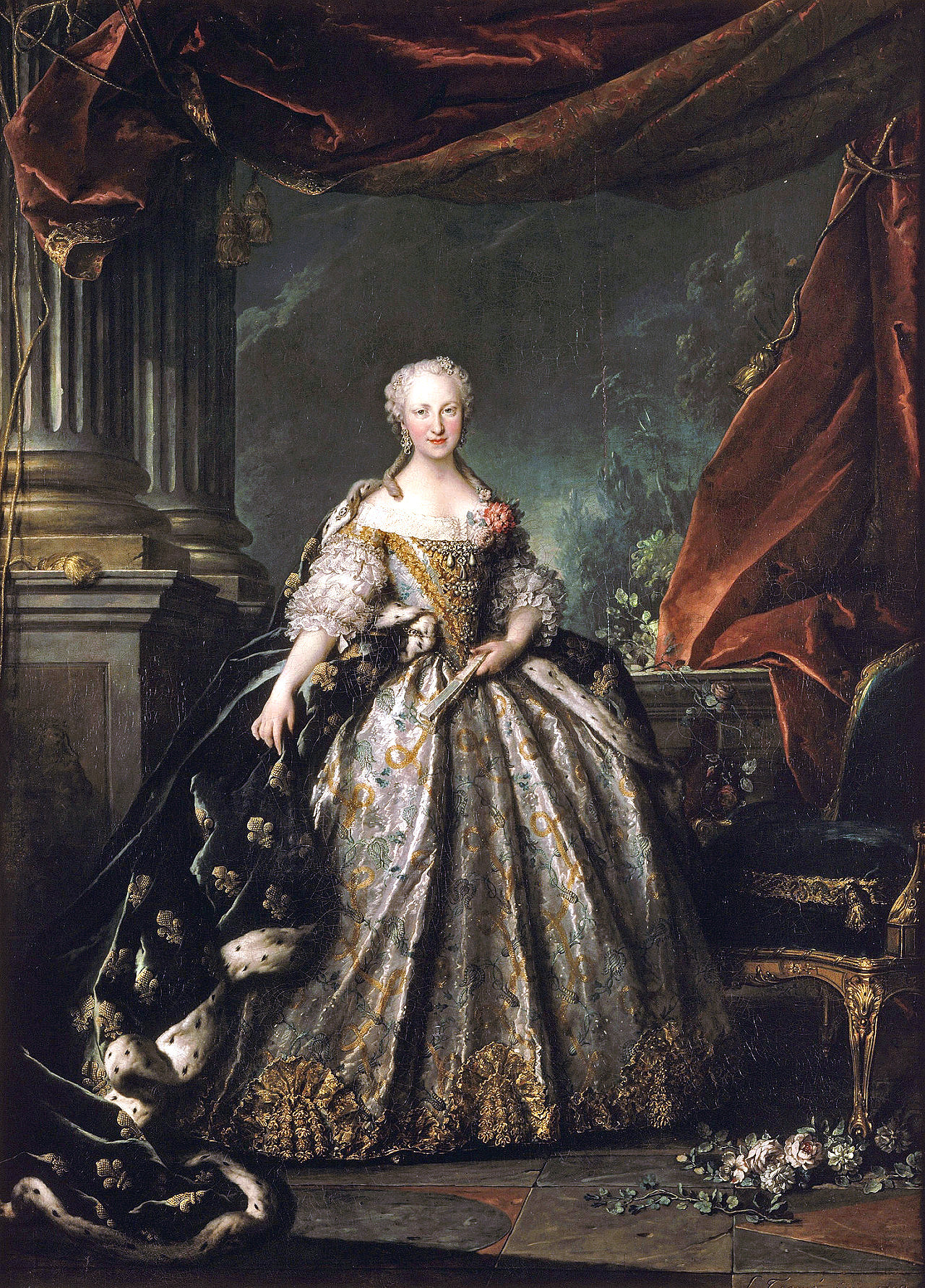
Posthumous portrait by Louis Tocqué, 1748

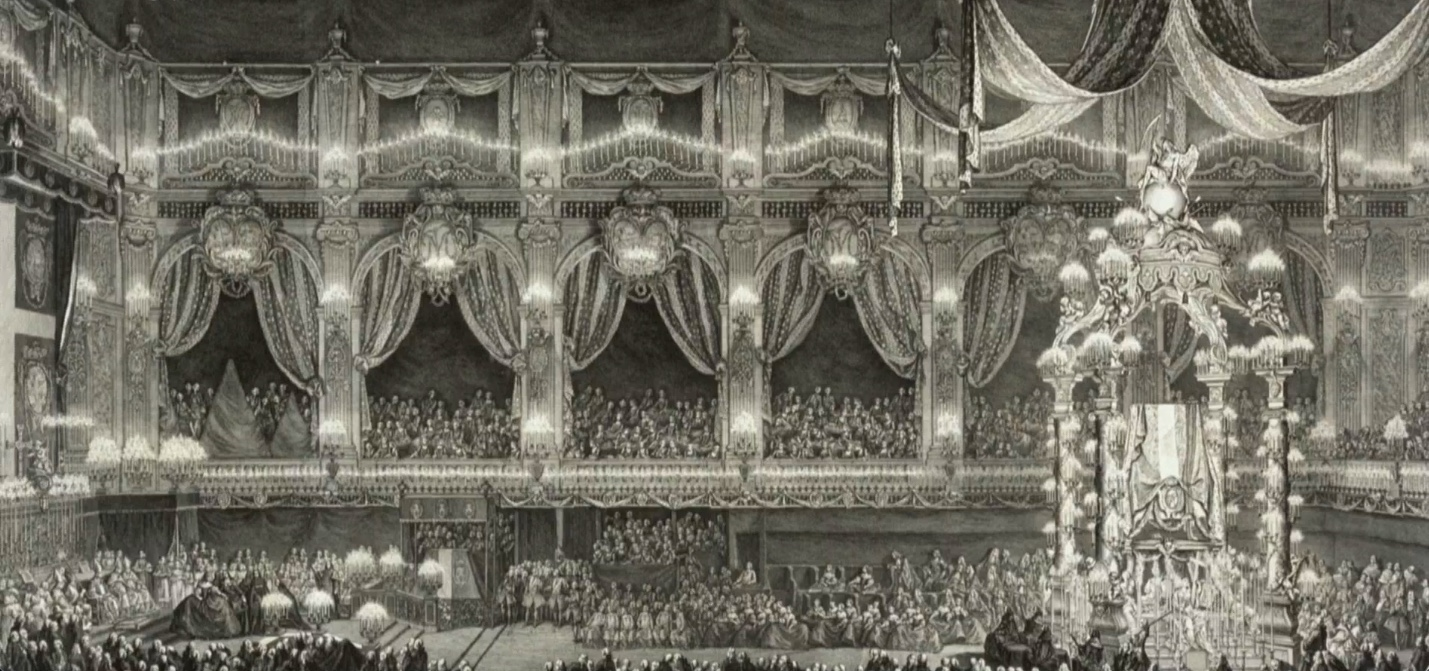
Funeral procession of Marie Thérèse Raphaëlle

The marriage did not get off on a good start as it was not consummated on the first night. This was a major embarrassment to the young dauphine and as a result her position at court was undermined. Despite this, she had a good relationship with the King and Queen, and her husband fell quickly in love with her. Although the Dauphine was described as beautiful, dignified, pious and well educated, negative remarks were made because of her red hair. Her shy nature further isolated her from the court and she was openly hostile to the King for his affair with Madame de Pompadour. The Dauphin and Dauphine disliked the royal mistress for the way she drew attention away from Queen Marie Leszczyńska. Finally, the marriage was consummated in September 1745, ending court gossip. The couple became very close and devoted to each other, spending most of their time together.

On 19 July 1746 at Versailles, Marie Thérèse Raphaëlle gave birth to a daughter. She died from complications just three days later, on 22 July. Her death caused intense sorrow to the Dauphin, which persisted into his second marriage. Louis XV had to physically drag his son away from the deathbed of his wife. To make matters worse, the Dauphine's father, King Philip V of Spain had died just 13 days before her on 9 July. The child was baptised Marie Thérèse and was styled as Madame Royale but died at Versailles in 1748.

Marie Thérèse Raphaëlle was buried at the Basilica of Saint-Denis, the French royal necropolis outside Paris on 6 August 1746. At her death, her half brother, Ferdinand VI, proposed that the Dauphin marry her sister the Infanta Maria Antonia Fernanda but Louis XV refused. The following year, Louis married again to Princess Maria Josepha of Saxony a daughter of Augustus III of Poland and Maria Josepha of Austria by whom he had seven children, including the future Louis XVI. When the Dauphin died in 1765, he requested that his heart be placed beside the grave of Marie Thérèse Raphaëlle.

== Issue ==
- Princess Marie Thérèse of France (19 July 1746 - 27 April 1748).

== Bibliography ==
- Armstrong, Edward (1892). Elisabeth Farnese, the Termagant of Spain. Longmans, Green, and Co.
- Broglie, Emmanuel de (1877). Le fils de Louis XV, Louis, dauphin de France, 1729-1765. E. Plon.
- Mitford, Nancy (1976). Madame de Pompadour. London: Sphere Books. ISBN 978-0-7221-6141-8.
