= Louis-Michel van Loo =

French painter (1707–1771)

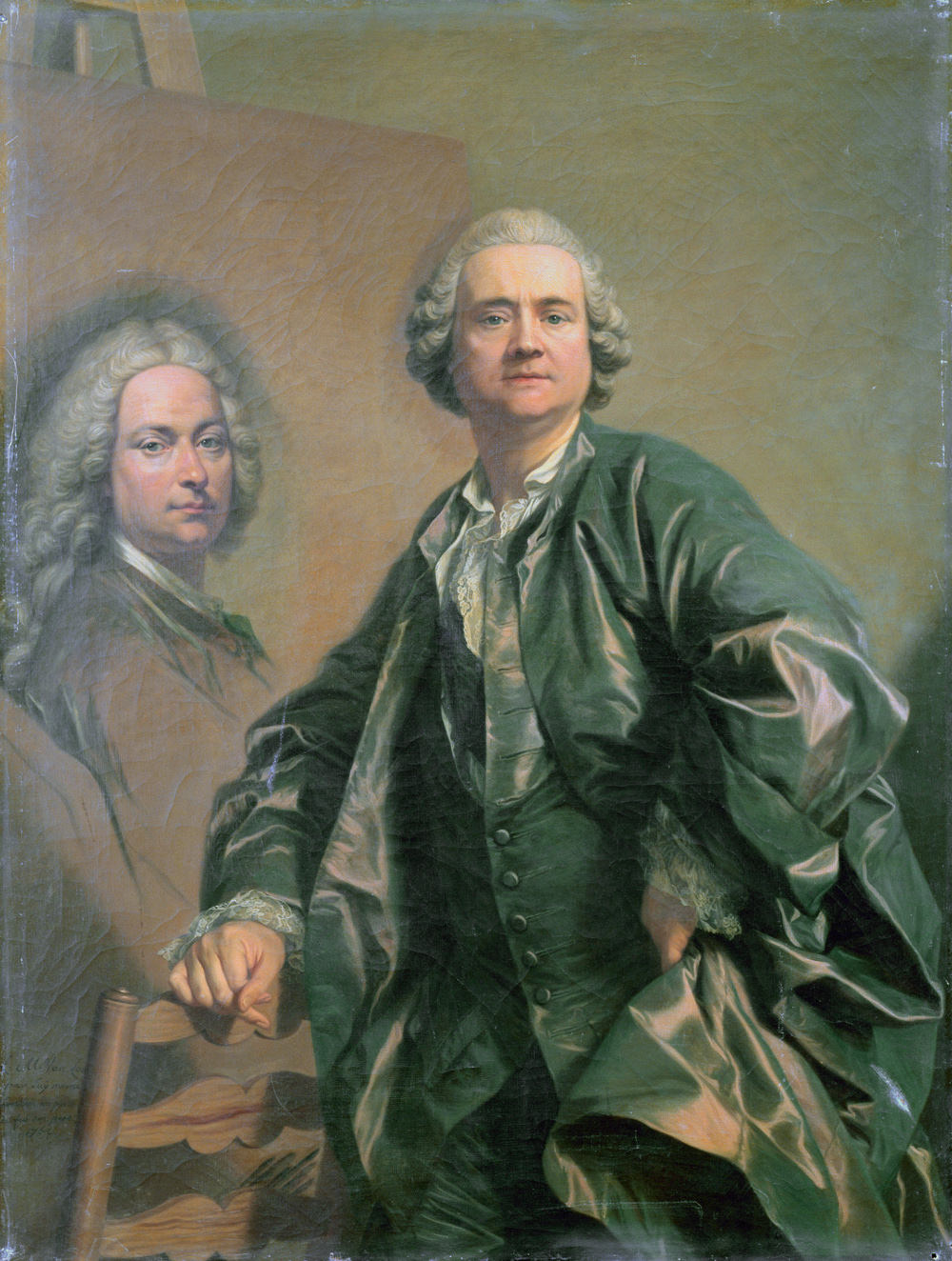
- Self-portrait, 1762
- Born: 2 March 1707; Toulon, Provence, France
- Died: 20 March 1771 (aged 64); Paris, France
- Parent: Jean-Baptiste Loo

Louis-Michel van Loo (2 March 1707 – 20 March 1771) was a French painter.

== Biography ==
He studied under his father, the painter Jean-Baptiste van Loo, at Turin and Rome, and he won a prize at the Académie Royale de Peinture et de Sculpture in Paris in 1725. With his uncle the painter Charles-André van Loo, he went to Rome in 1727–1732, and in 1736 he became court painter to Philip V of Spain at Madrid, where he was a founder-member of the Royal Academy of Fine Arts of San Fernando in 1752.

He returned to Paris in 1753, and painted many portraits of Louis XV. In 1765, he succeeded Charles-André as director of the special school of the French academy known as the École Royale des Élèves Protégés. In 1766, he made the portrait of the Portuguese statesman Sebastião de Melo, Marquis of Pombal.

Among his brothers were the painters François van Loo (1708–1732) and Charles-Amédée-Philippe van Loo (1719–1795).

== Selected works ==
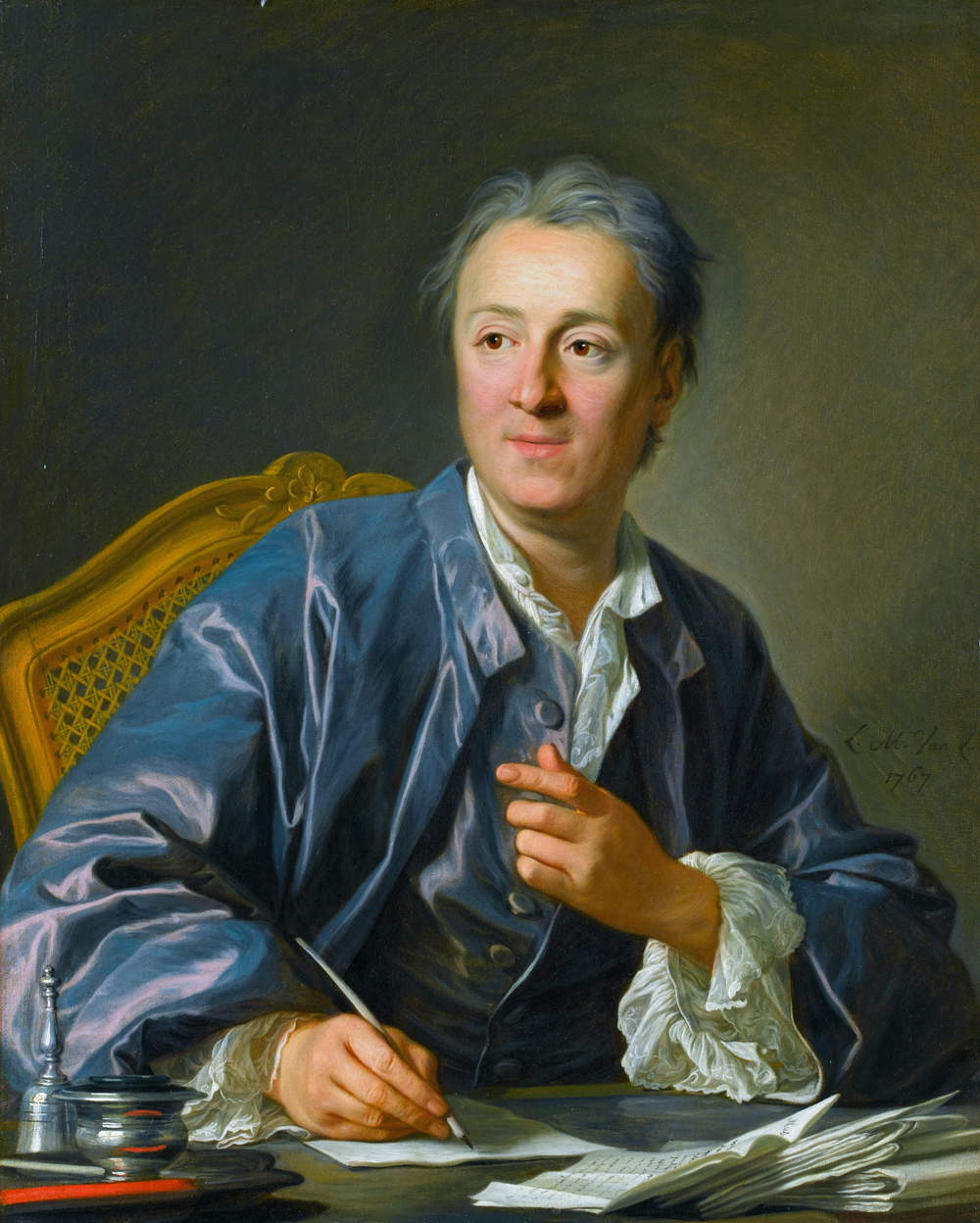
Portrait of Denis Diderot, 1767, Louvre Museum, Paris

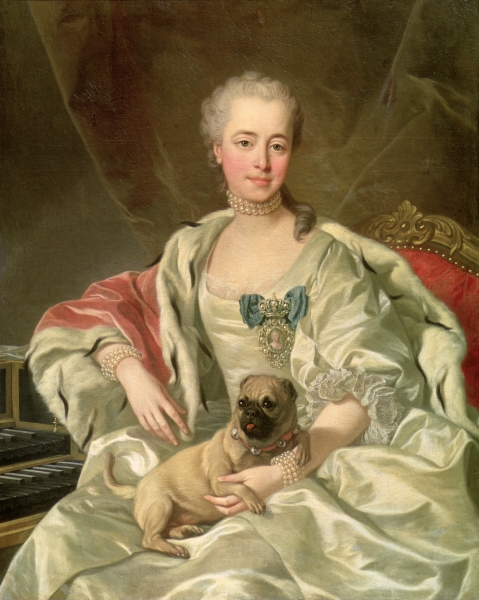
Princess Ekaterina Dmitrievna Golitsyna, 1759, Pushkin Museum of Fine Arts, Moscow

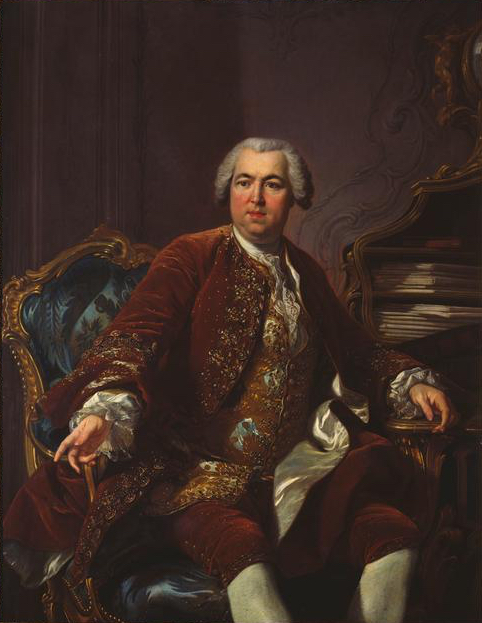
Nicolas Beaujon, Chaalis Abbey

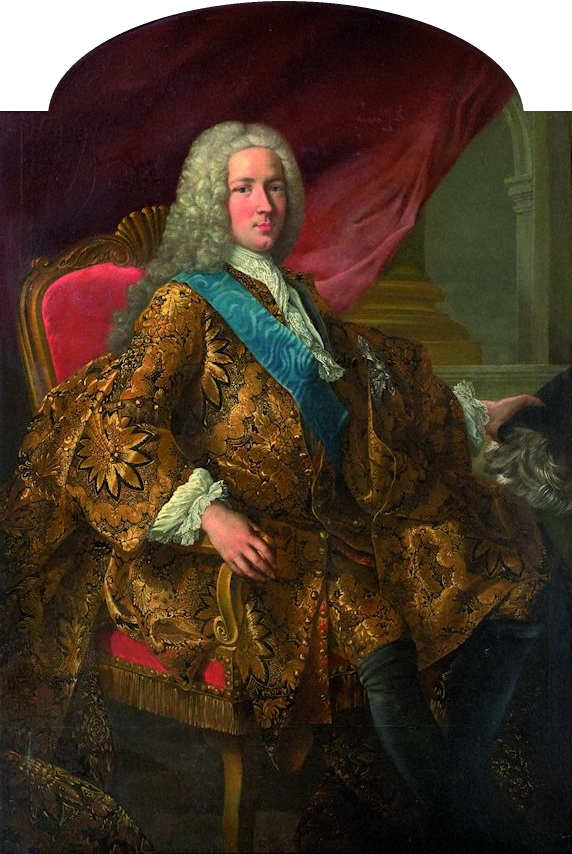
The Comte de Maurepas wearing the sash of the Order of the Holy Spirit, c. 1732–35, private collection

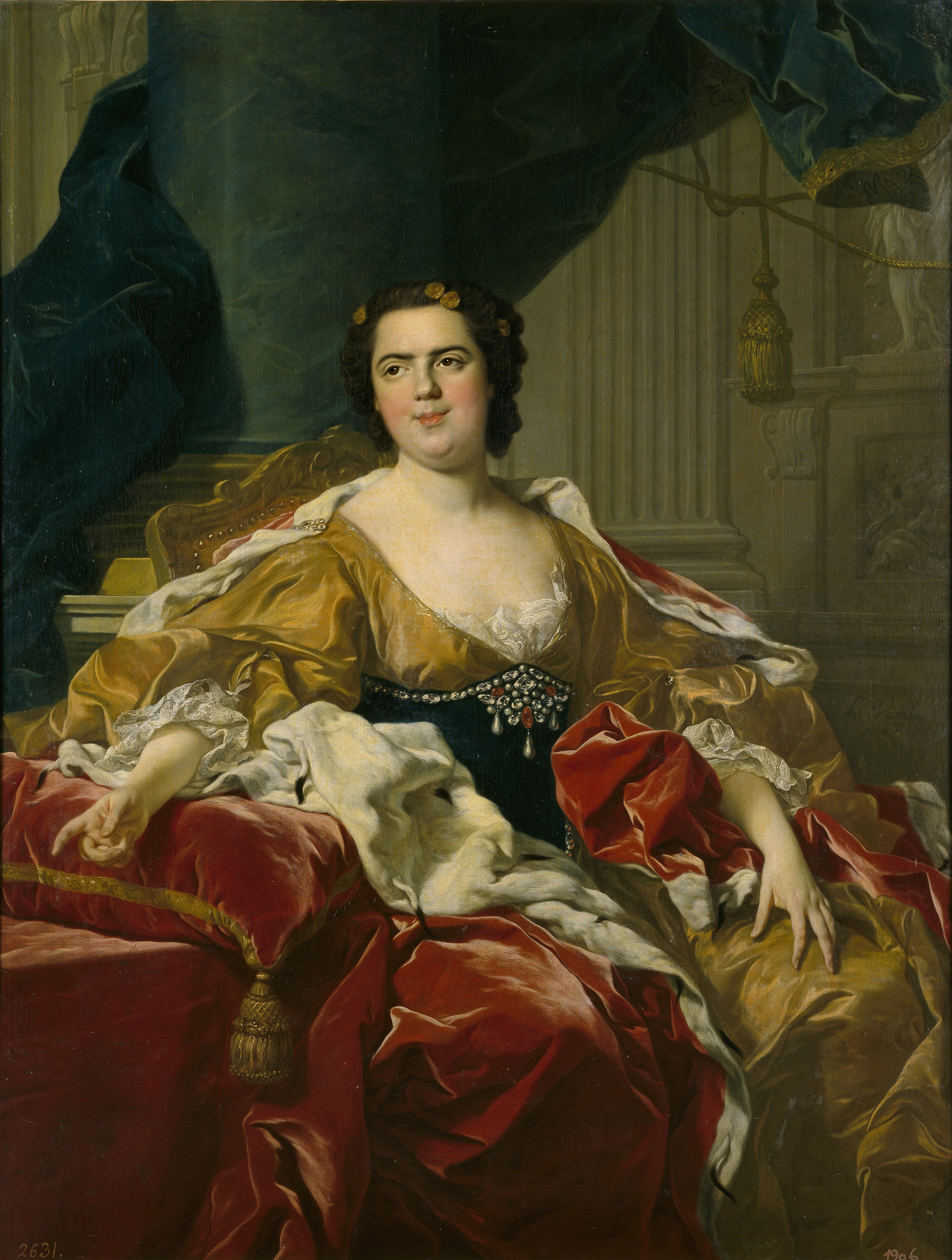
Louise Élisabeth of France, wife of l'infant Philippe, 1745, Prado Museum, Madrid

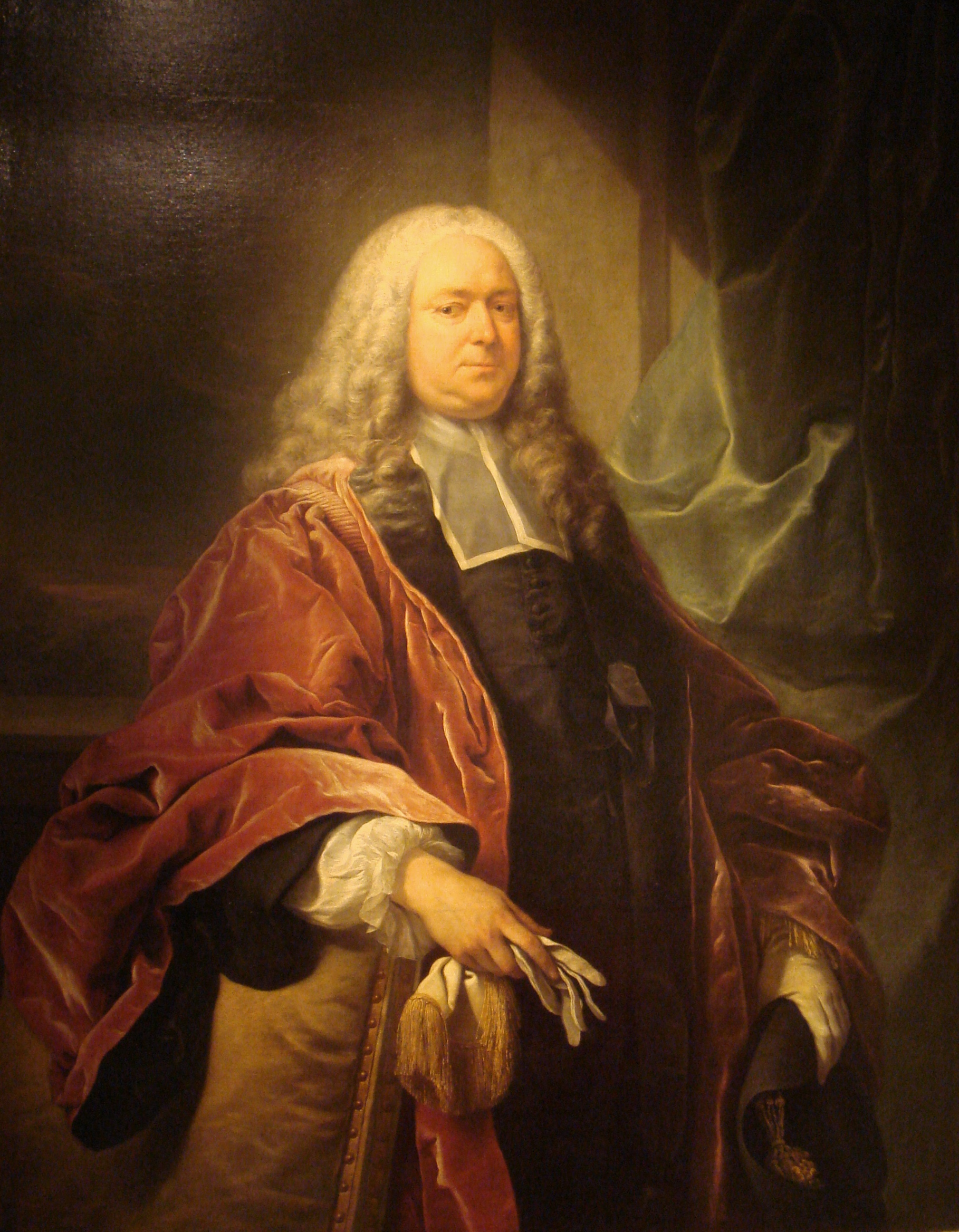
Michel-Etienne Turgot, 1739, Musée des Arts Décoratifs, Paris

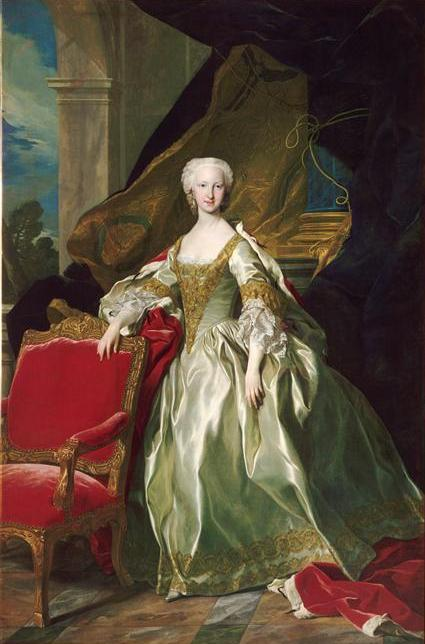
The Infanta Maria Teresa Rafaela of Spain, future Dauphine of France, c. 1745, Palace of Versailles

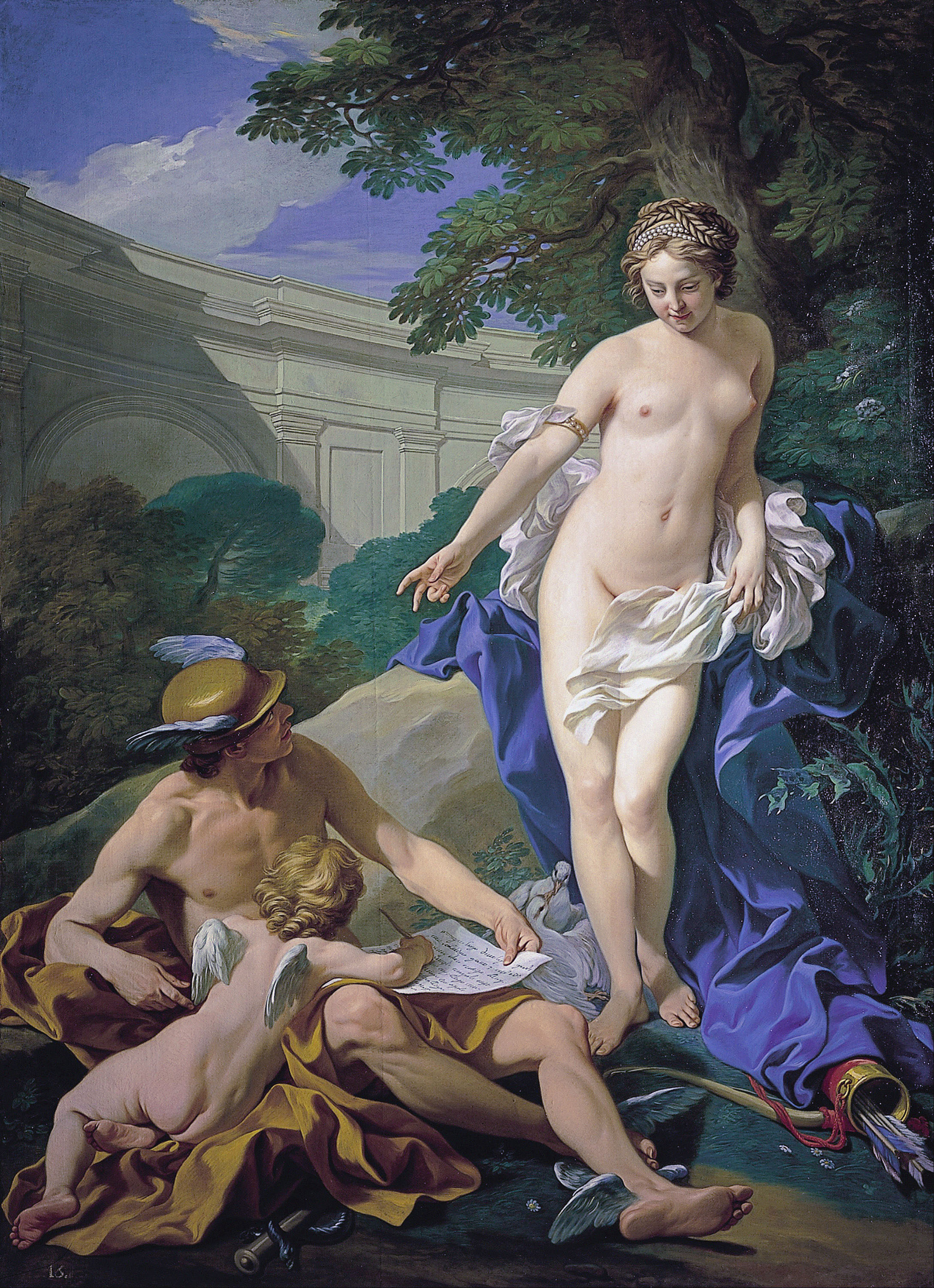
Venus, Mercury and Love, 1748, Real Academia de Bellas Artes de San Fernando, Madrid

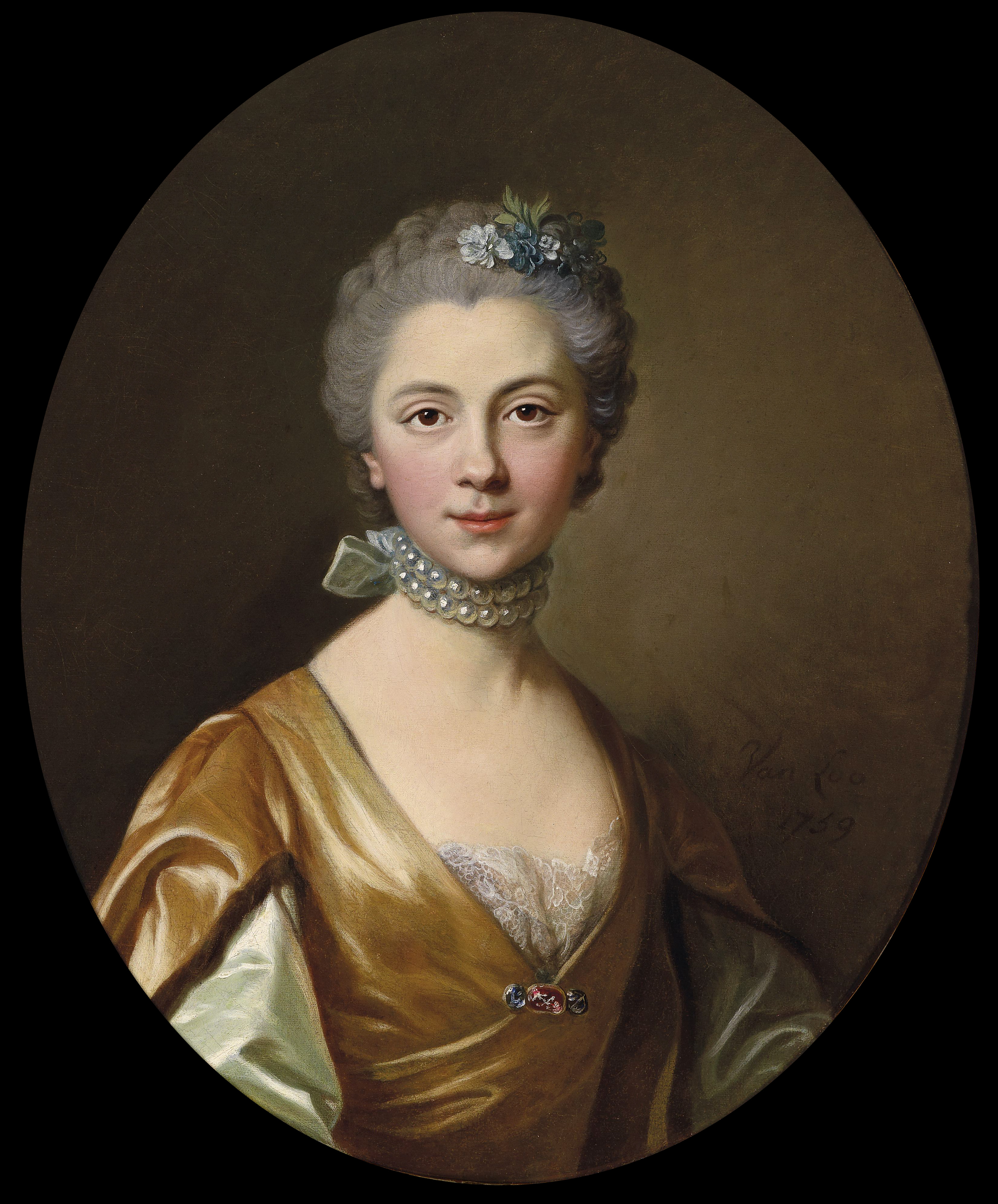
Portrait of a young woman, 1759, private collection

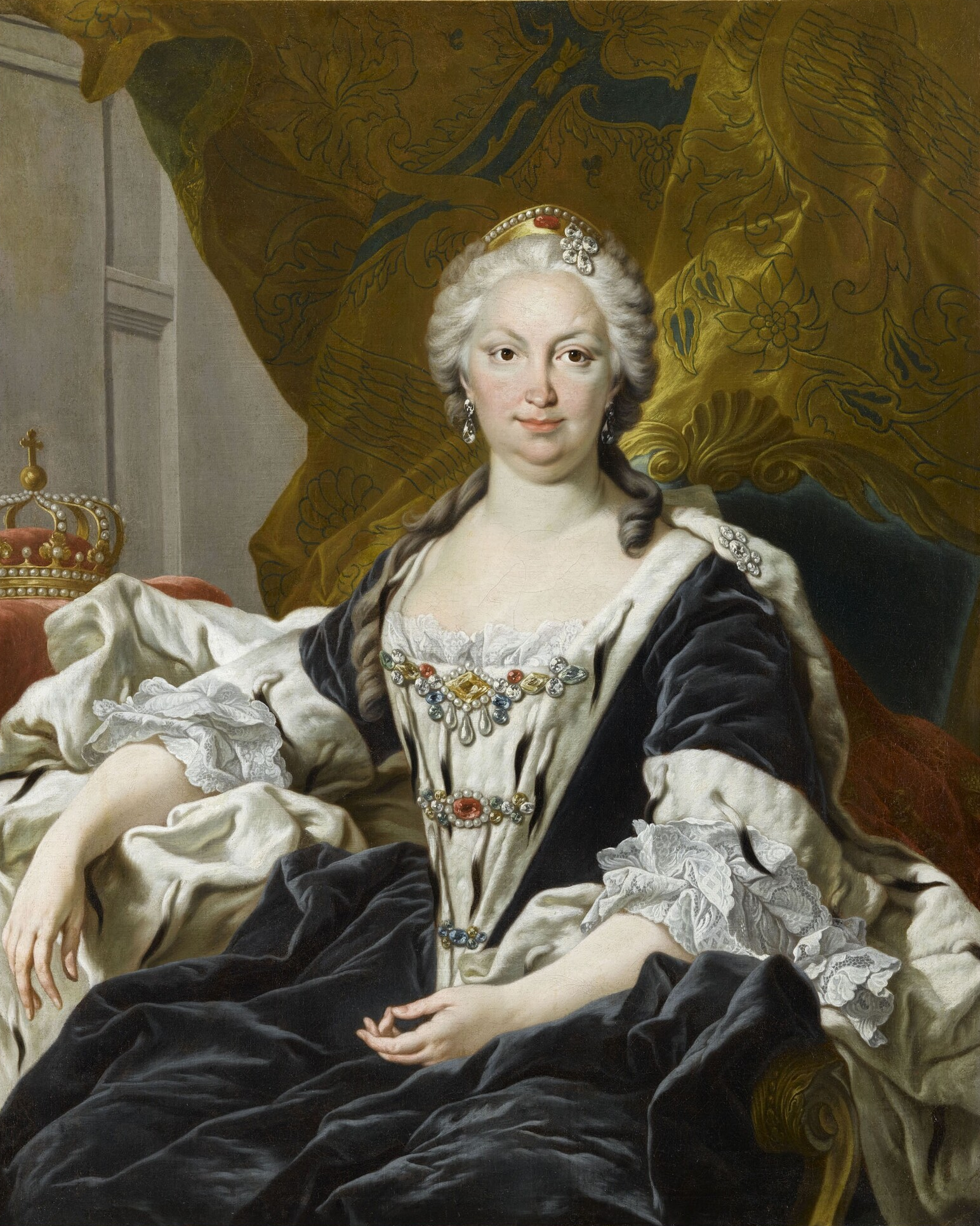
Portrait of Elisabeth Farnese, 1745, Palace of Versailles

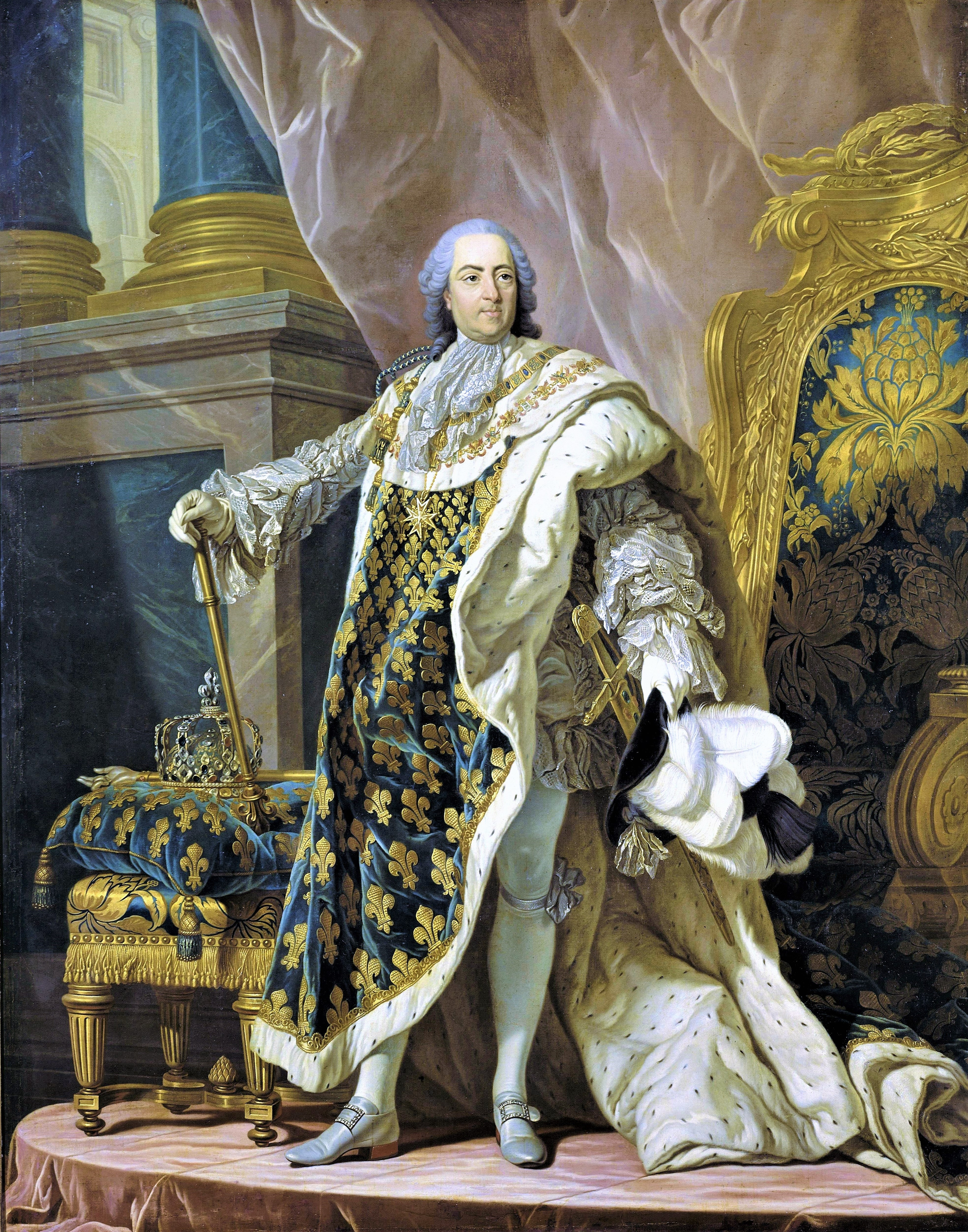
Portrait of Louis XV, 1765, Palace of Versailles

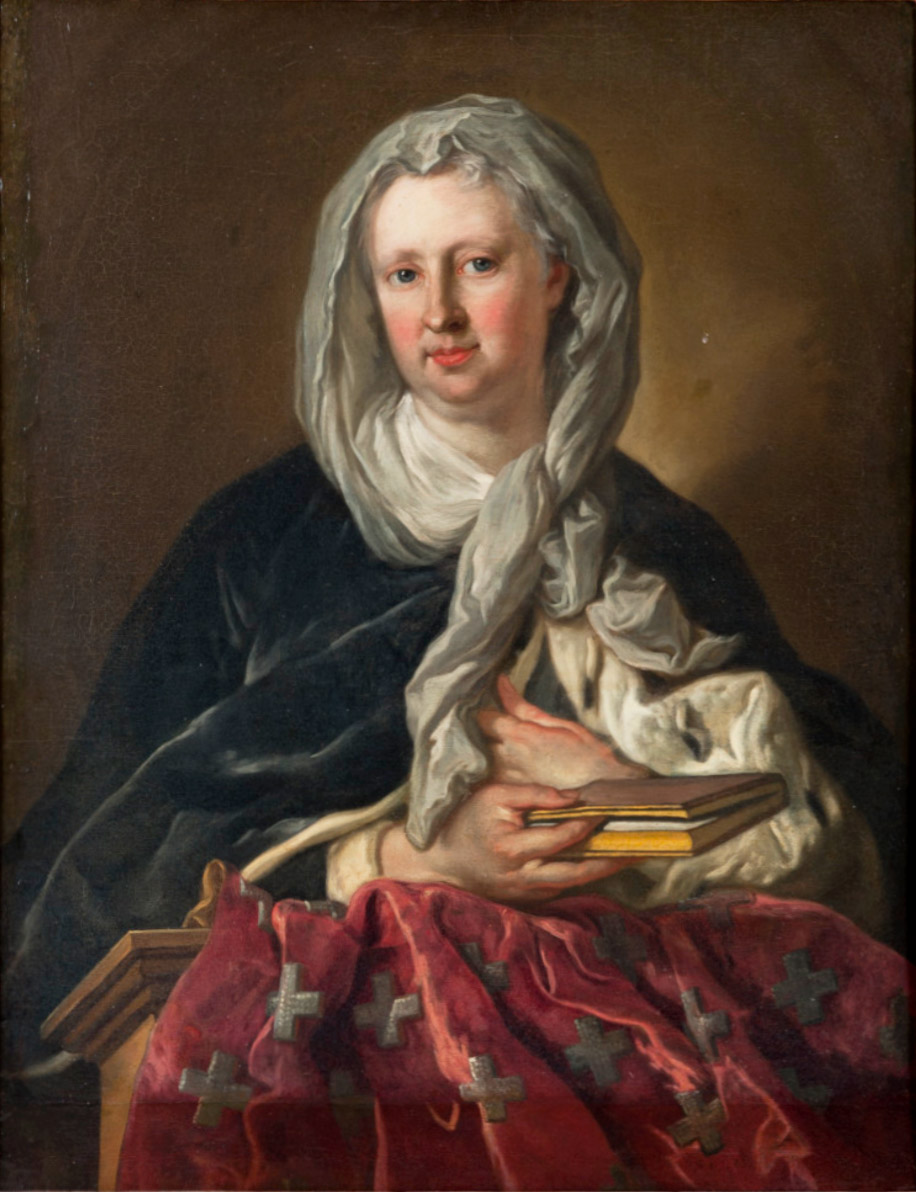
Maria Vittoria of Savoy, 1742/1745, Castle of Racconigi

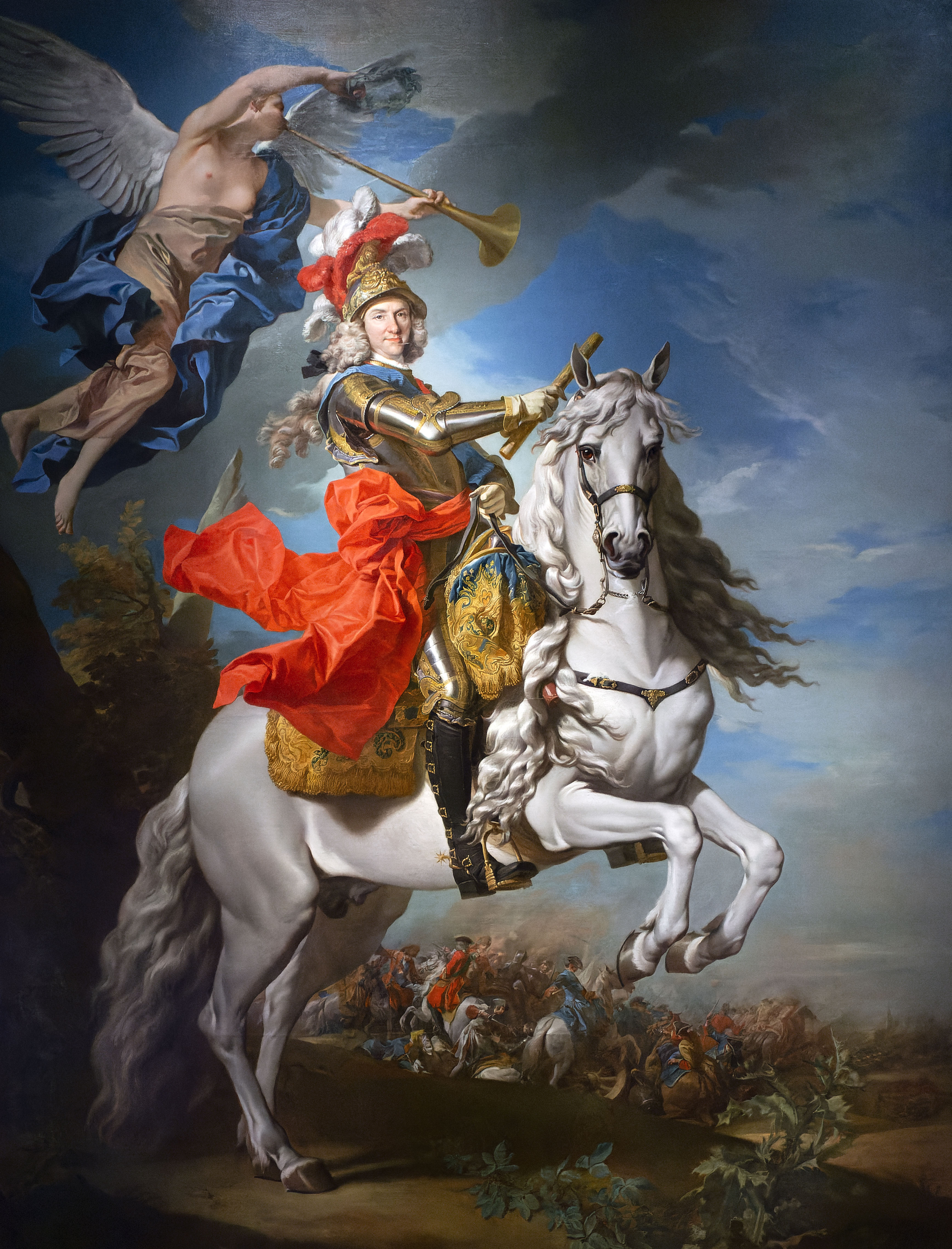
Portrait of Philip V, 1737, Royal Collections Gallery, Madrid

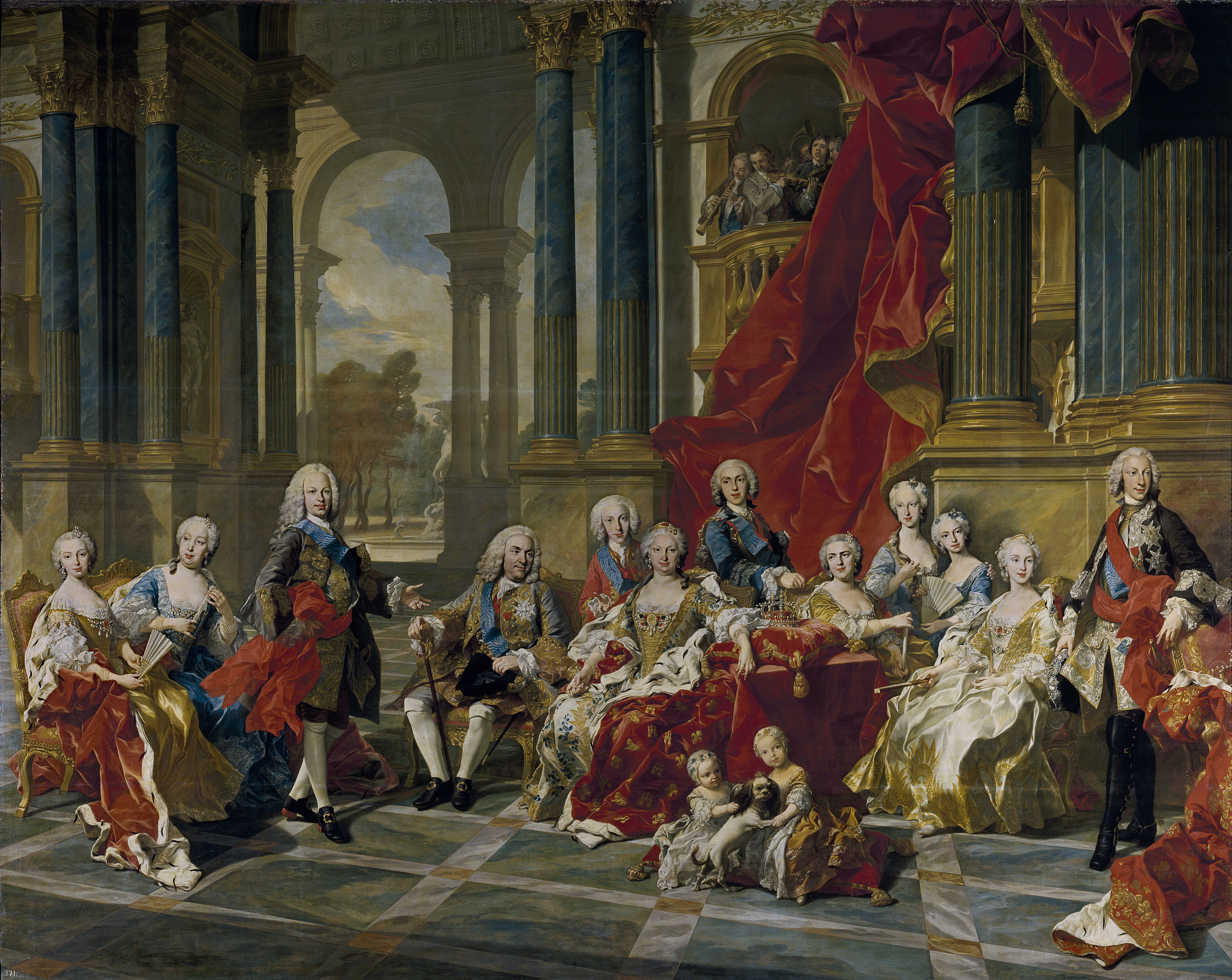
The Family of Philip V (1743), Prado Museum, Madrid

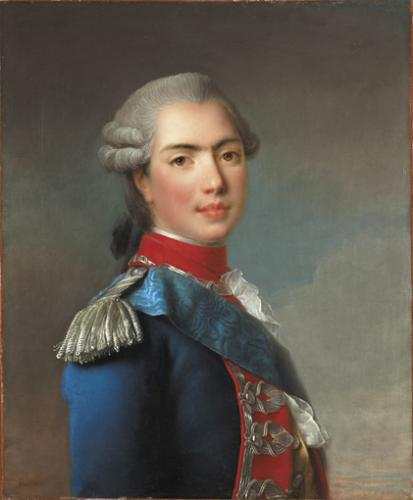
Portrait of Louis Stanislas when he was the Comte of Provence 1765/1771, unidentified location

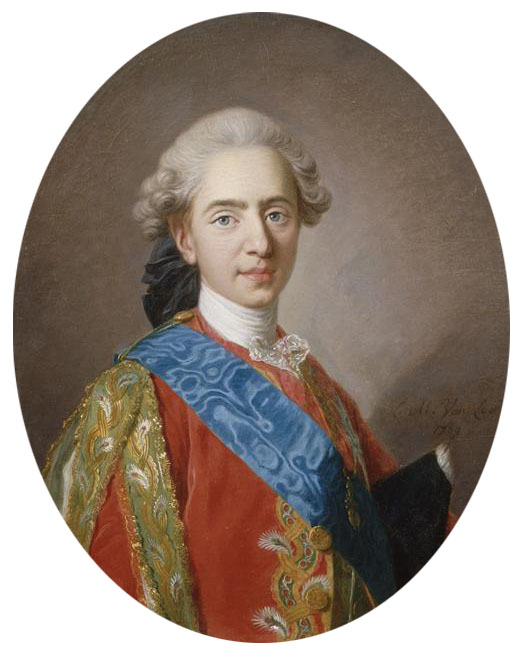
Portrait of Louis XVI when he was the Dauphin of France, 1769, Palace of Versailles

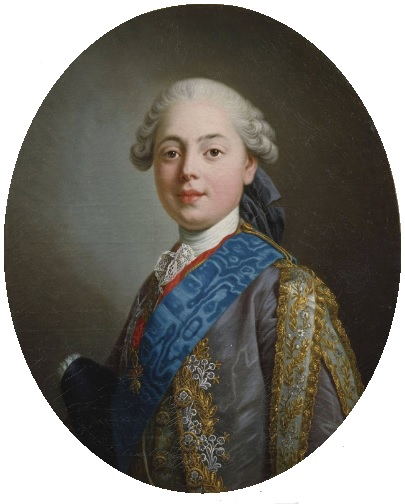
Portrait of Charles X when he was the Count of Artois, 1773, Palace of Versailles
