= Elisabeth Farnese =

Queen of Spain from 1714 to 1746

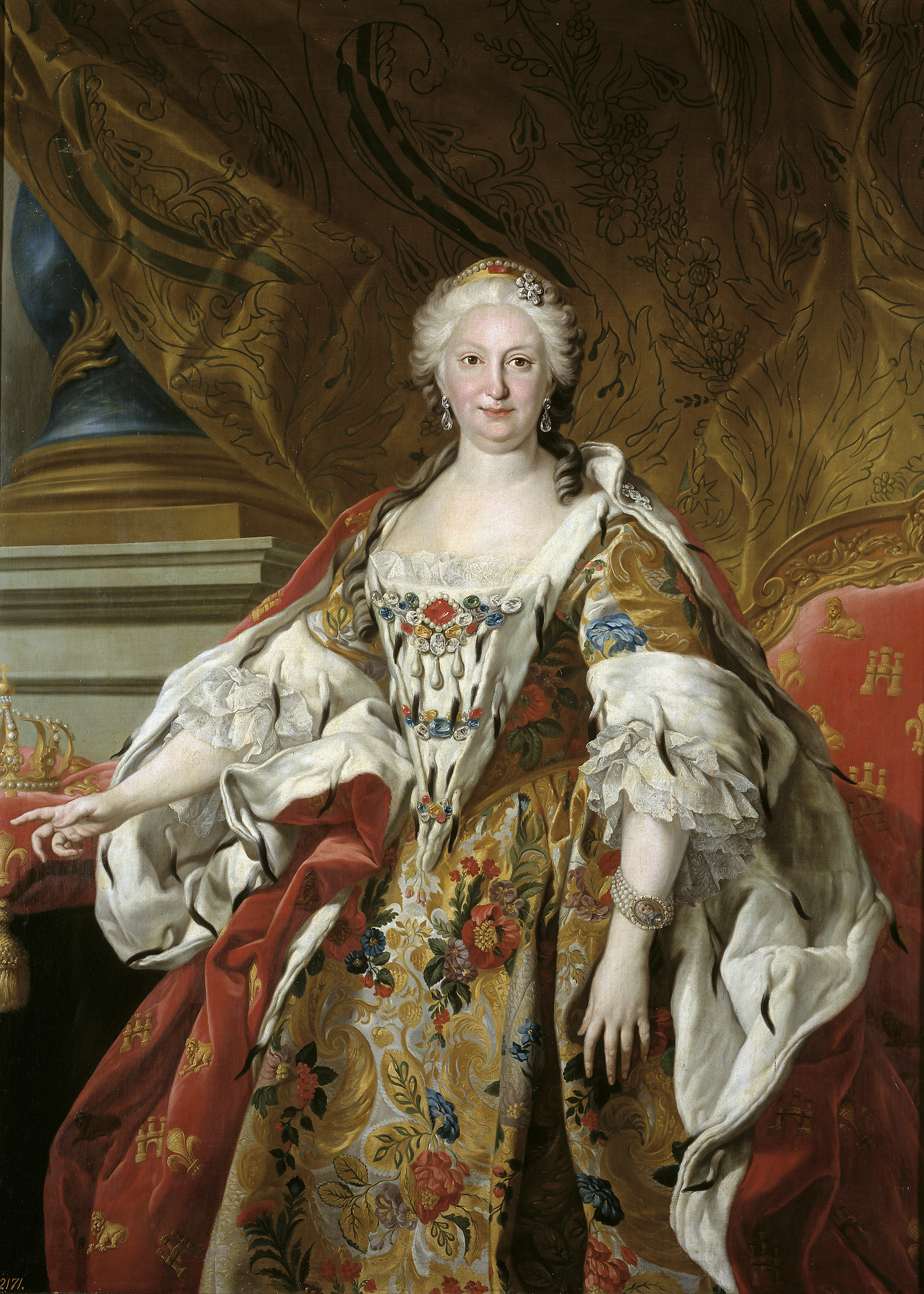
- Portrait by Louis-Michel van Loo, 1739

Queen consort of Spain
- Tenure: 24 December 1714 – 14 January 1724
- Tenure: 6 September 1724 – 9 July 1746

Queen regent of Spain
- Regency: 10 August 1759 – 9 December 1760
- Monarch: Charles III
- Born: 25 October 1692; Palazzo della Pilotta, Duchy of Parma
- Died: 11 July 1766 (aged 73); Royal Palace of Aranjuez, Aranjuez, Spain
- Burial: 17 July 1766; Royal Palace of La Granja de San Ildefonso
- Spouse: Philip V of Spain (m. 1714; died 1746)
- Issue Detail: Charles III, King of Spain; Mariana Victoria, Queen of Portugal; Philip, Duke of Parma; María Teresa Rafaela, Dauphine of France; Luis, Count of Chinchón; María Antonia Fernanda, Queen of Sardinia
Names
- Italian: Elisabetta Farnese; Spanish: Isabel de Farnesio
- House: Farnese
- Father: Odoardo Farnese, Hereditary Prince of Parma
- Mother: Dorothea Sophie of Neuburg

Elisabeth Farnese (Italian: Elisabetta Farnese, Spanish: Isabel de Farnesio; 25 October 1692 – 11 July 1766) was Queen of Spain by marriage to King Philip V. She was the de facto ruler of Spain from 1714 until 1746, since she managed the affairs of state with the approval of her spouse. She is particularly known for her great influence over Spain's foreign policy. From 1759 to 1760, she governed as regent.

Elisabeth was born in 1692 in Parma, the daughter of Odoardo Farnese, Hereditary Prince of Parma and his wife, Countess Palatine Dorothea Sophie of Neuburg. Elisabeth would be their only child to survive into adulthood, her siblings all dying in infancy. Her father died in 1693, and her mother later remarried to his younger brother (Elisabeth's uncle), Francesco, in hopes for another heir. This never happened, and Elisabeth remained sole heiress. Elisabeth's marriage was considered of great political importance, and she received many proposals, notably from Piedmontese and Modenese princes, ultimately being married to the Spanish king, Philip V, whose first wife, Queen Maria Luisa, had died earlier that year.

Soon after her arrival at the Spanish court, Elisabeth proved to be dominant and strong-willed. With the help of her Italian courtiers, she eliminated the French party at court and capitalized on her husband's frequent mental incapacity to enforce her own will. She pursued an aggressive international policy, attempting to place her husband and children in various European thrones, which granted her the contempt of her subjects and provoked the failed War of the Quadruple Alliance. With the wars of the Polish and Austrian Succession, however, she succeeded in enthroning her sons in Naples, Sicily and her native Parma, recovering most of the historical Italian territories of the Spanish royal house, while her daughters also married prominently into the French and Portuguese royal families.

She was scorned and admired at the same time by her contemporaries, who regarded her as an authoritarian, scheming and unscrupulous monarch. At times she came to the extent of personally heading divisions of the Spanish Army in her war efforts. Frederick the Great would state about her: "she walks boldly towards the fulfillment of her designs; there is nothing that can surprise her, nothing that can stop her."

Her son Charles (later King Charles III of Spain) would go on to inherit the Duchy of Parma, with Elisabeth's mother as regent. Following multiple transfers of power, including rulers from the House of Habsburg, her son Philip was made Duke. Thus, all further dukes of Parma have descended from Elisabeth.

== Parma ==
Elisabeth was born at the Palazzo della Pilotta in Parma, the daughter of Odoardo Farnese and Dorothea Sophie of Neuburg. Her mother later married her uncle Francesco Farnese, Duke of Parma.

Elisabeth was raised in seclusion in an apartment in the Palace in Parma. She had a difficult relationship with her mother, but was reportedly deeply devoted to her uncle-stepfather. She could speak and write Latin, French, and German and was schooled in rhetoric, philosophy, geography and history, but, reportedly, she found no interest in her studies and lacked intellectual interests. She was a better student in dance, studied painting under Pietro Antonio Avanzini and enjoyed music and embroidery. She survived a virulent attack of smallpox.

Because of the lack of male heirs of her father, her uncle-stepfather, and her youngest uncle, who all succeeded one another, preparations were made for the succession of the Duchy of Parma through the female line (her). She consequently received many marriage proposals. Victor Amadeus, Prince of Piedmont and Francesco d'Este, Hereditary Prince of Modena both asked for her hand but negotiations eventually failed, as well as Prince Pico della Mirandola. The Duchy of Parma would later be inherited by her first son, Infante Carlos. After his accession to the Spanish throne, the title passed on to her third son, Infante Felipe. It was he who founded the modern day House of Bourbon-Parma.

== Marriage ==
On 16 September 1714 she was married by proxy at Parma to Philip V of Spain. The marriage was arranged by the ambassador of Parma, Cardinal Alberoni, with the concurrence of the Princesse des Ursins, the Camarera mayor de Palacio of the King of Spain. Elisabeth was a natural choice for Philip V because of the traditional Spanish interests in Italian provinces, and she was the heir of the Parmesan throne.

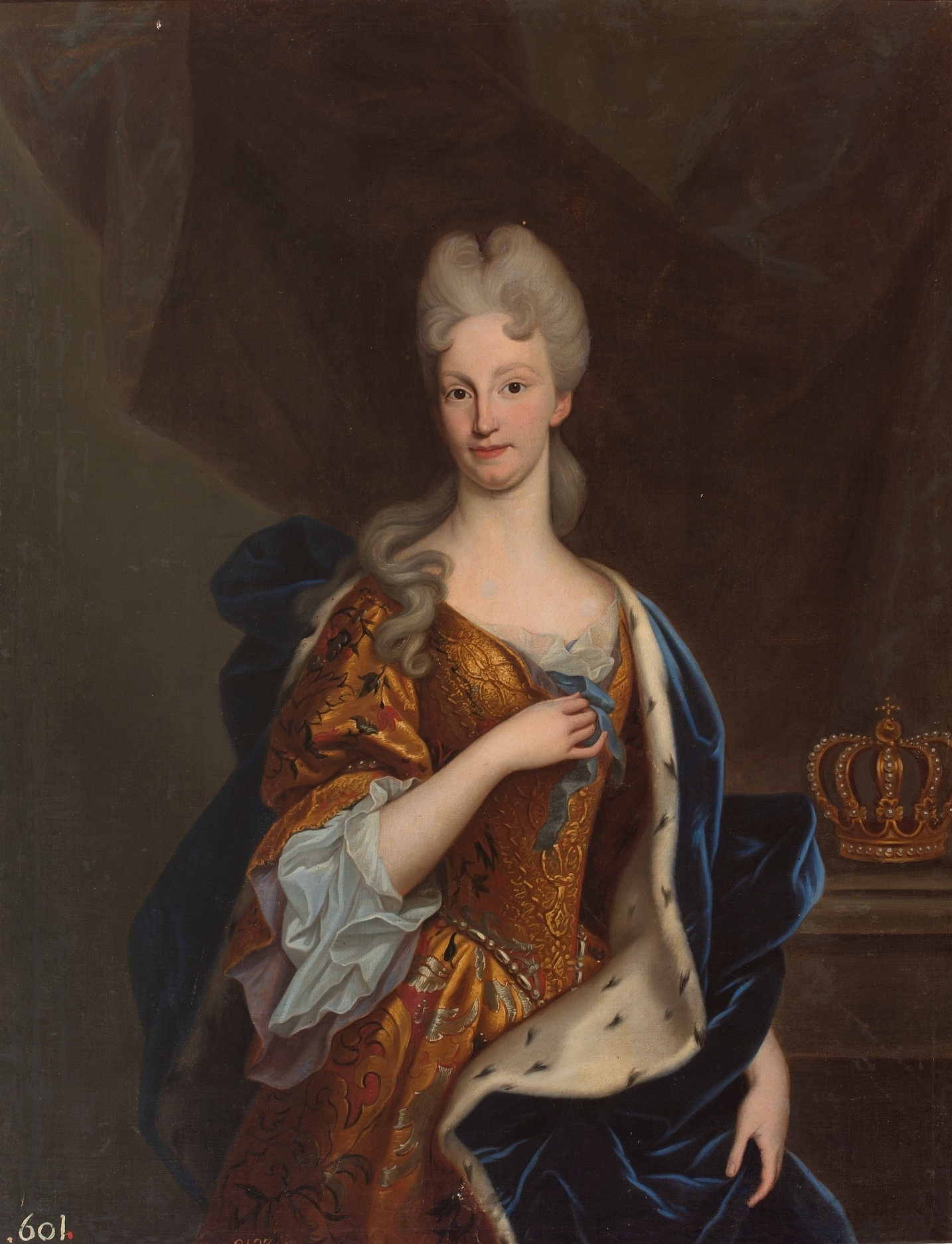
Elizabeth Farnese, c. 1720

The Parmese ambassador convinced the all-powerful Princess des Ursins to give her crucial consent to the marriage by convincing her that Elisabeth was a simple-minded person, accustomed to nothing but needlework and embroidery and easy to control and dominate as a replacement for the previous, cooperative queen consort. In parallel, Alberoni informed Elisabeth that the king "wishes to be governed" by others and that she would be an unhappy queen unless she swiftly took control, and that she would also be liked by the Spaniards if she removed the influence of the French party headed by the Princess des Ursins.

Elisabeth left Parma in September and traveled to Spain by land in a retinue led by Marquis Schotta and Ippolita Ludovisi, Princess of Piombino. Originally intending to travel by sea, she became ill in Genoa, and the plans were therefore altered. On her way to Spain, she met the Prince of Monaco and the French ambassador, who forwarded her gifts from the King of France. Elisabeth spent several days in Bayonne in November as guest of her maternal aunt, the Queen Dowager Maria Anna of Spain. At the Franco-Spanish border, she was met by Alberoni, who spent several days warning her against des Ursins. Upon entrance to Spain, she refused to part with her Italian retinue in exchange for a Spanish one, as had originally been planned.

On 23 December at Jadraque, Elisabeth met the Princesse des Ursins, who as her newly appointed Mistress of the Robes wished to present herself before Elisabeth met Philip V at Guadalajara. The princess had sent out spies who reported that Elisabeth was in fact not at all a timid person who would be easy to control. Elisabeth received des Ursins and asked to speak with her privately. Shortly after, the party could hear the sounds of a violent argument, after which des Ursins was arrested, fired, and immediately escorted over the border to France. There have been many different versions of this incident, and different suggestions as to how it occurred. Alberoni informed the king that Elisabeth had acted with his best interests at hand, and when Philip met Elisabeth at Guadalajara 24 December, he quickly fell in love with her at first sight, just as he had with his first spouse.

== Queen of Spain ==
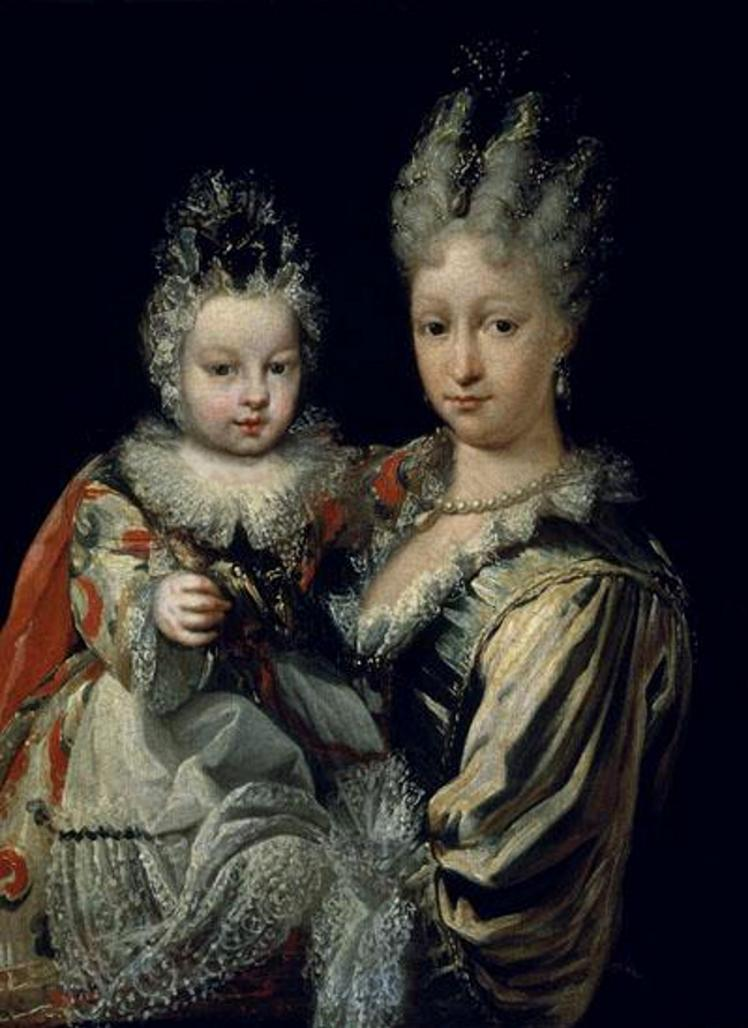
Elisabeth with her eldest son Charles.

Elisabeth enjoyed hunting and wore male riding attire while doing so. She was described as an excellent shot and rider, and often hunted with the king. She spent extravagantly, both on herself and on her confidants. Her circle of confidants consisted, except her nurse Laura Pescatori, of her Italian doctor Giuseppe Cervi and Annibale Scotti de Castelboco, Marquis Scotti, who were also a part of her Italian retinue.

Her favorites among her ladies-in-waiting was first her Flemish attendant La Pellegrina, who acted as the go-between for her and minister Patino, as well Duchess of S:t Pierre; after the former had married and the latter departed for France in 1727, she favored Marchioness Las Nieves, who had the task to act as the queen's informant and who by 1736 was said to be the one who should be courted for supplicants to the queen. She respected her Camarera mayor de palacio, Ángela Foch de Aragón, Countess de Altamira, who managed her ladies-in-waiting very strictly.

The queen collected Italian works from the 16th and 17th centuries, including masterpieces by Correggio, Guido Reni, Francesco Salviati and Flemish works by such celebrated artists as Anthony van Dyck, and the Bruegel family.

Initially, Queen Elisabeth was popular because her dismissal of des Ursins made her seem as the savior of Spain from French dominance, but her increasing influence over the monarch soon made her as unpopular as des Ursins. Elisabeth was also unpopular among the Spanish nobility for the decline of formal Spanish etiquette court life, and pamphlets of the "Spanish party" typically accused her of keeping the king in slavery, benefiting foreigners and trying to murder her stepsons.

Coat of Arms as Queen Consort of Spain

=== Political influence ===
With the advice of Alberoni and Cardinal del Giudice, Elisabeth became the confidante of Philip and proceeded to eliminate the French party at court. They were replaced with her own followers through a network of clients and supporters, created with the help of her Italian nurse Laura Pescatori. Her chief adviser was Alberoni, who guided her as to how to protect the interests of herself and Parma, while he himself, as a foreigner, had only her to rely on for his power.

Despite early accounts of her submissive stance, Queen Elisabeth gained strong influence over Philip and his advisors. Reportedly she had charm and purposefulness, she was intelligent and could converse, be happy, jovial and charming. But she was also ambitious for glory, approval and popularity. According to the French ambassador the Duke of Saint-Aignan, she got the king to believe that what she willed was what he wanted, and she shared his tastes and whims. Also, depressive episodes often left Philip V paralyzed and unable to handle government affairs, during which she handled them. Such periods occurred in 1717, 1722, 1728, 1731, 1732–33 and 1737, when Elisabeth seems to have dedicated herself exclusively to caring for his health.

In contrast to what was customary for a Spanish monarch, Philip preferred to share the queen's apartments rather than have his own separate ones, and it was in the queen's apartments he met with his ministers. Elisabeth was therefore present at all government meetings from the start, and while she initially sat by the side embroidering, she soon participated more and more and eventually speaking for her spouse while he sat quiet. The king did not live in his own apartments but in the queen's, where he spent the whole night. When he awoke, he discussed the government business with the queen, after which the couple, still in their dressing gowns, conferred with their ministers in the queen's bedroom while the government business was spread over the queen's bed by her ladies-in-waiting. From 1729, they seldom emerged from the queen's quarters before two in the afternoon, after which they very swiftly performed their official functions. Philip did not like ceremonial court life and preferred to live in the smaller hunting palaces such as El Pardo or Aranjuez, where ceremonial court life could not properly occur. The royal couple's absence from court life and lack of public visibility became so marked that they were criticized for it, especially Elisabeth. After the dismissal of Alberoni in 1719 she was effectively the sole ruler in Spain.

In 1724, entreaties failed to prevent the abdication of Philip, who gave up the throne in favour of his firstborn (Louis I), heir from his first marriage. Phillip then retired to the Royal Palace of La Granja de San Ildefonso. Also in 1724, Elisabeth acquired the San Ildefonso Group for him from the Odescalchi family. During the reign of Louis Elisabeth kept her hold of power. Seven months later, however, the death of the young king recalled Philip to the throne. It was Elisabeth who, with the aide of the ministers, the papal nuncio, theologians and her network of contacts, pressured him to retake the crown.

=== Foreign policy ===
Queen Elisabeth was uninterested in domestic policy and preferred foreign policy, where her goal was to enforce the Spanish presence in the Italian states, combined with her ambition for her own sons, who were initially not expected to succeed in Spain because of her stepsons. Elisabeth's influence was exerted altogether in support of Alberoni's policy, one chief aim of which was to recover the ancient Italian possessions of Spain. She also gave her support to the Cellamare conspiracy, where Philip was to be installed as regent of France, a position which would have given her simultaneous control of France and Spain.

Her influence also led the seizure of Sardinia and Sicily, causing the War of the Quadruple Alliance. So vigorously did she enter into this war that when the French forces advanced to the Pyrenees, she placed herself at the head of one division of the Spanish army. In April 1719, the queen accompanied the king on his campaign to the front upon the French invasion; dressed in a habit of blue and silver, she continuously reviewed and encouraged her troops on horseback. Her ambition, however, was grievously disappointed. The Alliance thwarted her plans when British troops raided Vigo, and by 1720 the allies made the banishment of Alberoni a condition of peace. Sicily and Sardinia also had to be evacuated.

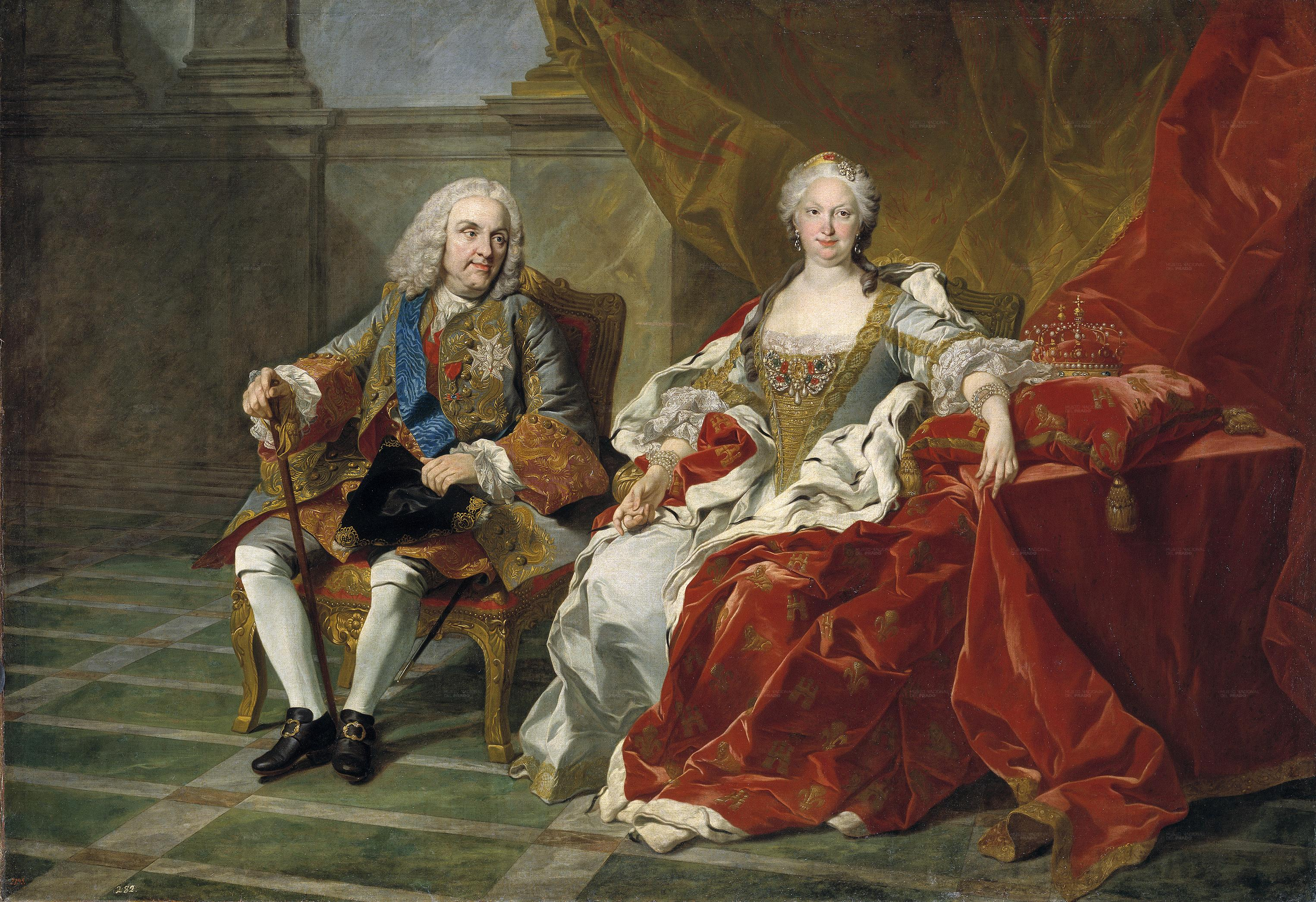
Philip V and Elisabeth in 1739

During the later years of Philip V, when he was nearly senile, Elisabeth directed the whole policy of Spain so as to secure thrones in Italy for her sons. In 1731 she had the satisfaction of seeing her favored scheme realized with the recognition by the powers in the Treaty of Vienna of her son Don Carlos (afterwards Charles III of Spain) as the Duke of Parma, and after the 1738 Treaty of Vienna his accession to the thrones of Naples and Sicily. Her second son, Philip, became Duke of Parma in 1748.

== Queen Dowager ==
On 9 July 1746, the reign of Elisabeth ended with the death of Philip V and the succession of her stepson Ferdinand. As Ferdinand, like his father, left the government business to his spouse, Maria Barbara, the French ambassador remarked that: "it is rather Barbara who succeeds Elisabeth than Ferdinand succeeding Philip."

Coat of Arms as Queen Dowager

As queen dowager, Elisabeth initially did not agree to surrender the reins of power. She settled with a court of supporters in a rented mansion in Madrid, and demanded to be kept informed of government policy and openly criticized the new monarchs. By mid 1747, Queen Barbara was encouraged to deal with her by Portugal and José de Carvajal y Lancáster, and on 23 July 1747, Elisabeth was exiled with her court to the palace of La Granja, where she spent the rest of her stepson's reign, exiled from the royal court and any influence on politics. She hosted grand receptions where she welcomed foreign diplomats and encouraged the criticism of the opposition toward her stepson.

The last time Elisabeth Farnese was involved in politics was after the death of her stepson Ferdinand VI in 1759. After his death, the Spanish throne went to her own son, then absent as the King of Naples. Elisabeth was then made interim regent of Spain from the death of Ferdinand VI in 1759 until the arrival of her son Charles III in 1760.

In the time between her husband's death in 1746 and her own in 1766, she witnessed many events: the accession to the Spanish throne of her stepson, Ferdinand VI and Barbara of Portugal, whom she hated; and the accession to the throne of Parma of her beloved second son, Philip. In 1752 she built the Royal Palace of Riofrío as her dowager residence.

She later spent much of her time at the palaces of La Granja and Aranjuez. She was a patron of the Royal Glass Factory at La Granja. She died at Aranjuez in 1766 at the age of 73. She was buried next to her husband in the Colegiata of San Ildefonso. Her extensive art collection was divided among her three sons.

== Issue ==
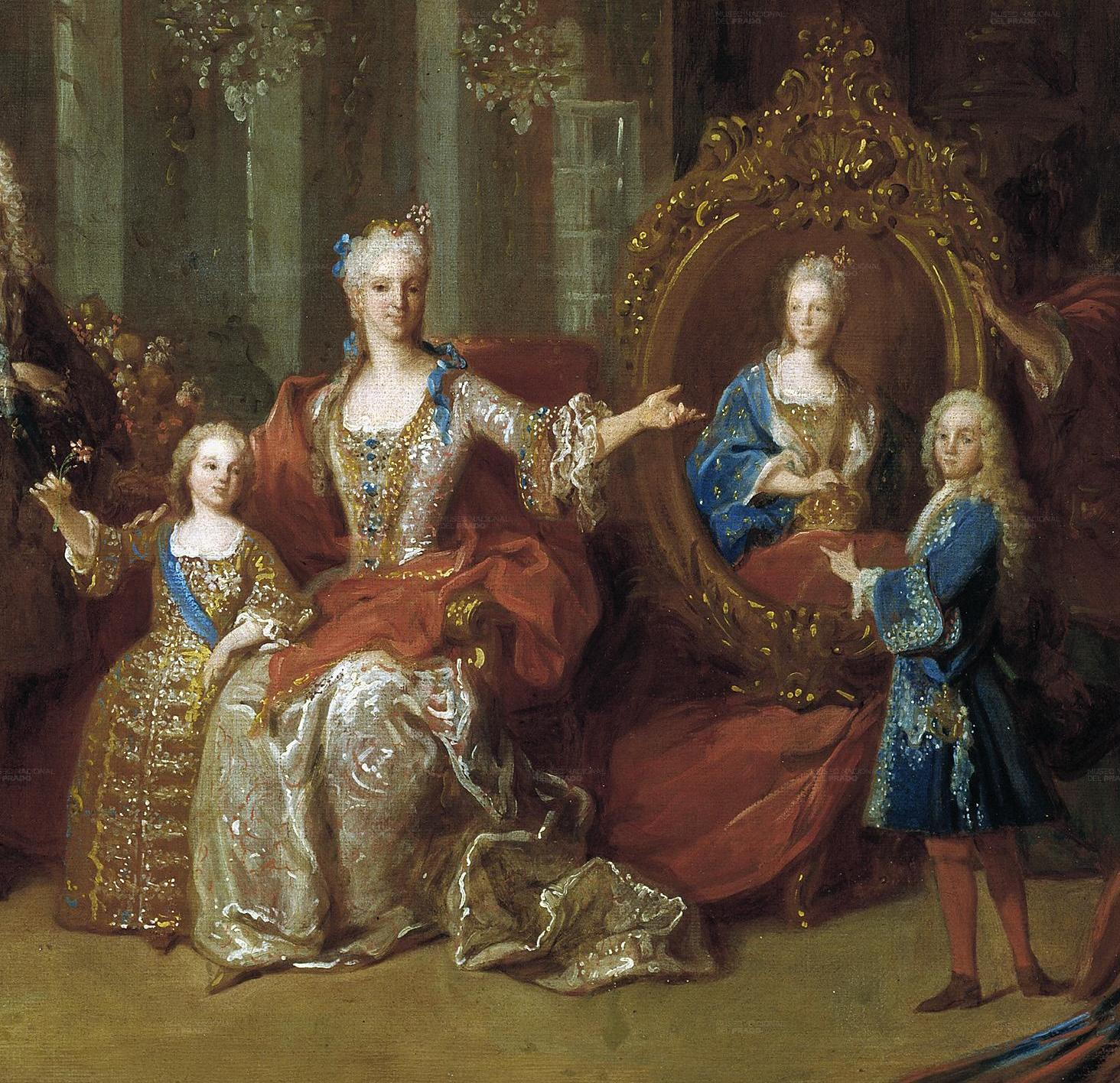
Queen Elisabeth with some of her children in 1723 (detail of The Family of Philip V by Jean Ranc)

1. Charles III of Spain (20 January 1716 – 14 December 1788), spouse of Maria Amalia of Saxony.
2. Francisco (21 March 1717 – 21 April 1717).
3. Mariana Victoria (31 March 1718 – 15 January 1781), Queen of Portugal by marriage to King Joseph.
4. Philip (15 March 1720 – 18 July 1765), Duke of Parma and founder of the line of House of Bourbon-Parma, spouse of Louise Élisabeth of France.
5. Maria Theresa Rafaela (11 June 1726 – 22 July 1746), spouse of Louis, Dauphin of France.
6. Luis (25 July 1727 – 7 August 1785), known as the Cardinal-Infante. Was Archbishop of Toledo, Primate of Spain and cardinal since 1735. In 1754, renounced his ecclesiastical titles and became Count of Chinchón. In 1776, he married morganatically María Teresa de Vallabriga and had issue, but without royal titles.
7. Maria Antonietta Ferdinanda (17 November 1729 – 19 September 1785), spouse of Victor Amadeus III of Sardinia.

== Sources ==
- Armstrong, Edward (1892). Elisabeth Farnese, the Termagant of Spain. Longmans, Green, and Co.
- Kamen, Henry (2001). Philip V of Spain: The King Who Reigned Twice. New Haven, Conn.: Yale University Press. ISBN 0-300-08718-7.
- Lavalle-Cobo, Teresa (2002). Isabel de Farnesio:la reina coleccionista (in Spanish). Michigan University. ISBN 9788493003098.
- Orr, Clarissa Campbell (2004). Queenship in Europe 1660-1815: The Role of the Consort. Cambridge University Press.
- Sanchez, Magdalena S. (2017). Early Modern Dynastic Marriages and Cultural Transfer. Taylor & Francis.
- Vasi, Giuseppe (1996). Le magnificenze di Roma nelle incisioni di Giuseppe Vasi (in Italian). Newton and Compton. ISBN 9788881834273.
- Petrie, Charles: King Charles III of Spain New York, John Day Company, 1971
- Harcourt-Smith, Simon: Cardinal of Spain: the Life and Strange Career of Giulio Alberoni New York, Knopf, 1955
- Mémoires pour servir à l'histoire d'Espagne sous le régne de Philippe V by the Marquis de St Philippe, translated by Maudave (Paris, 1756)
- Memoirs of Elizabeth Farnese (London, 1746)
- The Spanish original of the Comentarios del marqués de San Felipe was published in the Biblioteca de Autores Españoles

Styles of Elisabeth, Queen of Spain as consort
- Reference style: Her Catholic Majesty
- Spoken style: Your Catholic Majesty

Elisabeth Farnese House of Farnese Born: 22 October 1692 Died: 11 July 1766
Spanish royalty
Vacant Title last held by Maria Luisa of Savoy	Queen consort of Spain; 24 December 1714 – 14 January 1724	Succeeded by Louise Élisabeth d'Orléans
Preceded by Louise Élisabeth d'Orléans	Queen consort of Spain; 6 September 1724 – 9 July 1746	Succeeded by Barbara of Portugal
