= Van Loo =

Van Loo is a Dutch toponymic surname, meaning "from the forest clearing", see van (Dutch).

People with this surname include:

A family of painters

- Jacob van Loo (1614–1670), Dutch painter
- Louis-Abraham van Loo (1653–1712), Dutch-born French painter, son of Jacob
- Jean-Baptiste van Loo (1684–1745), French painter, son of Louis-Abraham
- Charles-André van Loo (1705–1765), French painter, brother of Jean-Baptiste
- Louis-Michel van Loo (1707–1771), French painter, son of Jean-Baptiste
- Charles-Amédée-Philippe van Loo (1719–1795), French painter, son of Jean-Baptiste

Others

- Albert Vanloo (1841–1920), Belgian librettist and playwright
- Anthony Van Loo (born 1988), Belgian footballer
- Brian van Loo (born 1975), Dutch football goalkeeper
- Christine Van Loo, American aerialist and acrobat
- Leon Van Loo (1841–1907), Belgian-born American photographer and art promoter
- Hayden van Loo (1982-present), Australian born - average surfer, golfer
