= Chicago Philharmonic =

Orchestra in Chicago

- Orchestra
- Founded: 1988
- Location: Chicago, Illinois
- Principal conductor: Scott Speck
- Website: Official website

The Chicago Philharmonic is an American orchestra based in Chicago, Illinois, governed by the Chicago Philharmonic Society. Founded in 1988 by principals of the Lyric Opera Orchestra of Chicago, it is a musician-governed, non-profit organization consisting of nearly 200 classical music performers from the Chicago area. Since 2013, the artistic director and principal conductor has been Scott Speck.

== History ==
In 1979, the principals of the orchestra of the Lyric Opera established the Orchestra of Illinois which performed until early 1988 when it ran into financial difficulties. The principals went on to form The Orchestral Society of Illinois in June 1988 which first performed in March 1991 as "Symphony II" under the leadership of Larry Rachleff who was the orchestra's artistic director until May 2013. In 2004, the orchestra's name was changed to The Chicago Philharmonic. The legal name of the society behind the orchestra became The Chicago Philharmonic Society in 2012. In 2012 the organization, led by its new Board Chairman Paul R. Judy, also began a transition to its formal and unique structure as a musician-governed society supported by an active membership of musicians and non-musicians.

In 2013, Scott Speck, music director at the Joffrey Ballet, was named artistic director and began serving as principal conductor.

The Chicago Philharmonic has been the official orchestra for the Joffrey Ballet since 2012. The orchestra has maintained a partnership with Ravinia Festival for over 20 years and has served as a resident company at the Harris Theater for Music and Dance at Millennium Park in downtown Chicago since 2016.

== Organizational structure ==
In 2012 the Chicago Philharmonic Society formalized its structure as a musician-governed society supported by an active membership of musicians and non-musicians. Inspired by Pierre Boulez's philosophy of an "ensemble of possibilities" and Ernest Fleischmann's "community of musicians", as ideal forms for the leadership and development of major musical arts organizations, musicians are invited to participate in all aspects of the organization.

The basic principle that guides the structure of the organization is: "The Society is most effective at achieving its musical aims when informed and controlled by musicians." Musicians participate in leadership and governance in several ways:

- Board of directors – At all times, at least half the membership of the board of directors is made up of musician members of the society. The current chair of the board is Thomas Manning, with Duffie Adelson and Robert Everson serving as vice-chairs, and James Berkenstock as artistic advisor.
- Participation in the society's seven committee which provides guidance and advice to the organization's administration: Artistic Policies and Programming, Personnel, Patron Services, Development and Endowment, Financial Services, Chamber Music Programming and Policies, and Diversity and Inclusion Committees. The majority of committee members are musician members of the society, some of whom also serve on the board of directors.
- Involvement through the Musicians Advisory Council. This group of musician members elected by the board provides a large pool from which to draw future board and committee members. In addition, the council provides feedback to management and the board concerning the society's musical and organizational policies and activities.
- Employment on the administrative team. Chicago Philharmonic Society executive director Donna Milanovich was a flutist in the Chicago Philharmonic for almost 20 years before taking on her leadership role in the organization's administration. The majority of the administrative team has degrees or minors in music, arts administration and/or other creative fields.

== Performances ==
The orchestra's symphonic concerts cover the full spectrum of classical music from Baroque to music of living composers. Self-presented symphonic concerts are performed in venues including Pick-Staiger Hall in Evanston, North Shore Center for the Performing Arts in Skokie, and Harris Theater in downtown Chicago.

Since 2010, the Chicago Philharmonic Chamber Players, chamber groups of between 2-6 performers drawn from musician members of the society, have performed chamber concerts in locations including Park Ridge, City Winery and Jazz Showcase in downtown Chicago, and throughout Illinois and Wisconsin.

In addition, Chicago Philharmonic has performed in Chicago venues including Symphony Center, Auditorium Theater, Chicago Theater and Ravinia Park. They have also performed at Ferro Pavilion at Lake Geneva in Wisconsin and Koch Hall at the Lincoln Center, New York. They have performed with artists including Joshua Bell, the Los Angeles Master Chorale, Lady Gaga, Tony Bennett, Johnny Mathis and Third Coast Percussion. Other contractual engagements have included Chicago Opera Theater, the Miami City Ballet, Seth MacFarlane, American Ballet Theatre, Zelda Symphony of the Goddess and Disney in Concert: Tim Burton's The Nightmare Before Christmas. The orchestra has performed under the baton of conductors such as Zubin Mehta, Sir Andrew Davis and Gerhardt Zimmermann.

In 2017 the orchestra traveled to Poland for its first ever tour and cultural exchange, followed by the first Chicago Philharmonic Festival: Poland 2018. In Poland they held masterclasses and performances with students at the Academy of Music in Krakow, performing works by American composers, and a chamber concert at the Krzysztof Penderecki European Centre of Music in Lusławice. In November 2018 the second part of the project, the Chicago Philharmonic Festival: Poland 2018 hosted Polish artists performing concerts, some alongside the Chicago Philharmonic orchestra, across 5 days in Chicago, Illinois. Artists included The Silesian Quartet, organist Andrzej Białko, pianist Piotr Orzechowski, pianist Łukasz Krupiński, conductor Marek Moś and more, performing works from Chopin, Bacewicz, Szymanowski, Gorecki, Penderecki, Paderewski and Wojciech Kilar's Missa Pro Pace.

Other performances in the 2018–2019 season include Weill's Suite from The Threepenny Opera, Ravel's Piano Concerto in G Major, Harbison's Remembering Gatsby, Gershwin's Rhapsody in Blue, Tchaikovsky's Romeo and Juliet Overture, Daugherty's Raise the Roof, Rimsky-Korsakov's Scheherazade, as well as live musical accompaniment to films Sherlock Jr., Fadeaway with Koko the Clown and Sure-Locked Homes with Felix the Cat and a collaboration with Cirque de la Symphonie.

== Education and Community Outreach ==
Chicago Philharmonic produces several Education and Outreach programs to reach young and aspiring musicians in under-served communities across Chicago and the greater Illinois areas.

- Chi Phil AMP (Academy of Music Performance) provides young music students with meaningful, repeated in-school interactions with, and mentoring by, Chicago Philharmonic musicians. The society works directly with the schools to present the 6 week program and currently serves 4 schools.
- Side by Side with the Chicago Philharmonic is presented in association with the Chicago Parks District to bring free symphonic concerts with both professional and student/amateur musicians to Chicago parks. Student and community musicians are invited to rehearse a symphonic concert alongside the orchestra musicians, culminating in the free concert. As of 2018, the program presents 6 concerts across the year.
- Families to the Phil provides young people from diverse ethnic and socio-economic backgrounds the opportunity to share the powerful experiences of a live, fully professional symphonic concert with their family for free.
- Spotlight is an advanced mentoring program designed to give professional symphonic performance opportunities to exceptional young musicians.
- NEXT! in the Foyer gives extraordinary musicians the opportunity to be heard by Chicago Philharmonic patrons, musicians and conductors, by showcasing their talents on the foyer before and during intermission of Chicago Philharmonic concerts.

== Reception ==
In 2002, the Illinois Council of Orchestras named Symphony II the Orchestra of the Year. In 2018, the Illinois Council of Orchestras again honored the Chicago Philharmonic naming them the 2017 Professional Orchestra of the Year.

Chicago Philharmonic has been called "one of the country's finest symphonic orchestras" by the Chicago Tribune's John von Rhein and “One of the finest ballet orchestras in the country” by Hedy Weiss in the Chicago Sun-Times.
