= Louis-Abraham van Loo =

Dutch painter (1653–1712)

Louis-Abraham van Loo (French pronunciation: [lwi abʁaam vɑ̃ lo]; 1653 in Amsterdam – 1712 in Nice), known as just Abraham van Loo until his conversion to Catholicism in 1681 and also known as Louis or Ludovic van Loo, was a baroque mannerist painter and a member of the van Loo dynasty of painters. Louis-Abraham was the son of the Dutch Golden Age painter Jacob van Loo and father to the painters Jean-Baptiste van Loo and Charles-André van Loo (known as Carle van Loo.) The majority of Louis-Abraham's paintings were of religious subject matter. Louis-Abraham received painting and fresco commissions from the church and from a number of enclosed religious orders in Lyon, Aix-en-Provence, Grasse, Majorca and Nice. He also received commissions to complete the fine decoration (including paintings for the officer's quarters) of several ships of the Marine Royale (French Navy) at Toulon. He died in Nice in 1712.

== Life and work ==
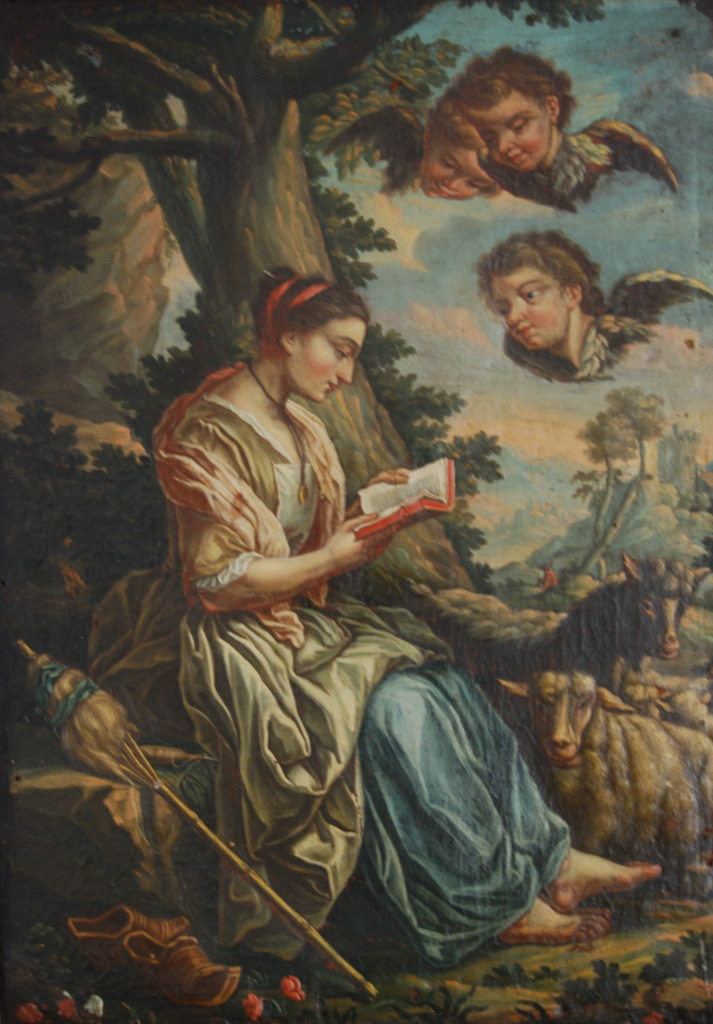
Sainte Genevieve,1681

=== Flight to Paris ===
Abraham was born in Amsterdam in 1653 but was taken to Paris at the age of seven. His father Jacob van Loo had been involved in an altercation at an inn, during which he stabbed a man with his sword. The man subsequently died of his injuries and Jacob was found guilty of murder and forced to flee the country with his family.

In 1667, Abraham and his brother Jean were naturalised as French citizens. The brothers followed courses offered by the Académie Royale de peinture but on 29 November 1670 one of them was expelled for voies de fait (assault). Both boys ceased attending the courses, though a year later, in 1671, each won a prize at the salon exhibition in the Palais du Louvre. Abraham achieved a huitième prix (eighth prize) for a painting entitled Louis XIV donnant la paix a L'europe; a canvas which celebrated the end of the war of devolution achieved by the Treaty of Aix-la-Chapelle (1668).

=== Travels in Italy ===
Abraham and Jean van Loo disappeared from the records for a period of ten years after their expulsion from the Academy. It is assumed that they travelled extensively throughout Italy during this time, perfecting their art.

Commissions

- 1682 – Louis and his brother Jean were contracted to complete the fine decoration of ships of the Marine Royale at Toulon.
- 1683 – Louis established himself at Aix-en-provence where he received a number of commissions from local churches and the cathedral, including a commission to decorate the catafalque in the cathedral of Saint Sauveur, for the funeral service of Maria Theresa of Spain, Queen of France, who died on 30 July 1683 at Versailles.

On 27 January 1683, he married Marie Fossé, daughter of the sculptor Jacques Fossé. Louis' eldest son Jean-Baptiste van Loo was born at Aix on 11 January 1684. Jean-Baptiste would later become the tutor of his much younger brother Carle van Loo, who, in turn, would become the most successful painter of the van Loo dynasty.

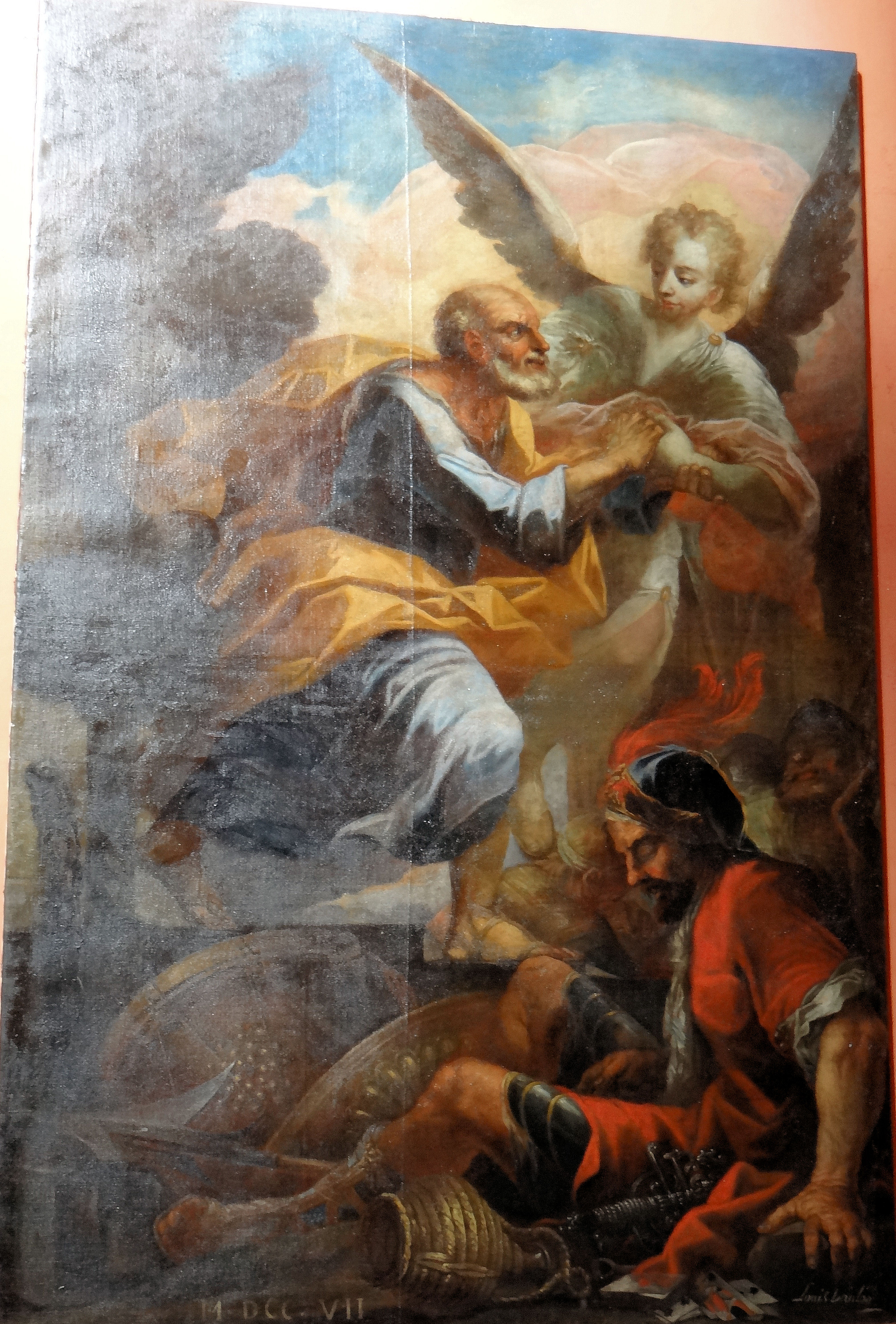
St Peter delivered by an Angel, in the church of Gilette, 1707.

- 1686 – A contract to complete the fine decoration twelve vessels of the Marine Royale encouraged Louis to move his family back to Toulon. He also painted a fresco in the chapel of the maritime hospital at Toulon.
- 1687-1694 - Louis and family were installed in the town of Grasse, where he received a number of commissions for paintings and frescoes from enclosed religious orders in the area. Two more of his sons were born during this period.
- 1695-1698 – The van Loo's were resident on the island of Majorca, where, along with other artists, Louis was commissioned to paint frescoes in the monastery of San Salvador near Felanitx.
- In 1699 Louis moved his family to Nice, where he remained until his death in 1712. Louis and Marie had four more children in Nice, including Charles-Andre (Carle van Loo) who was baptised in the cathedral of Saint Réparate in 1705.

=== Legacy ===
For many years, Louis-Abraham was thought to have lived a modest life, with relatively few commissions. However, studies published in the years 1985 and 2000 suggested that Louis' work was difficult to distinguish from typical baroque mannerist paintings of his era, which explains why an assessment of his oeuvre has always been problematic. It was demonstrated that even during his quietest final thirteen years, Louis had scattered a number of paintings among the grand houses of Provence and Northern Italy. On 24 October 1707, he also received a commission for twelve paintings to decorate the Palais-Royal in Paris, on the occasion of the birth of Louis, son of Philip of Spain and grandson of Louis XIV. After his death, a further ten paintings were recorded in his studio inventory, all at various stages of completion.

== Sources ==
- "Ванло или ван-Ло, художники" . Brockhaus and Efron Encyclopedic Dictionary (in Russian). 1906.
