= Jacob van Loo =

Dutch painter (1614–1670)

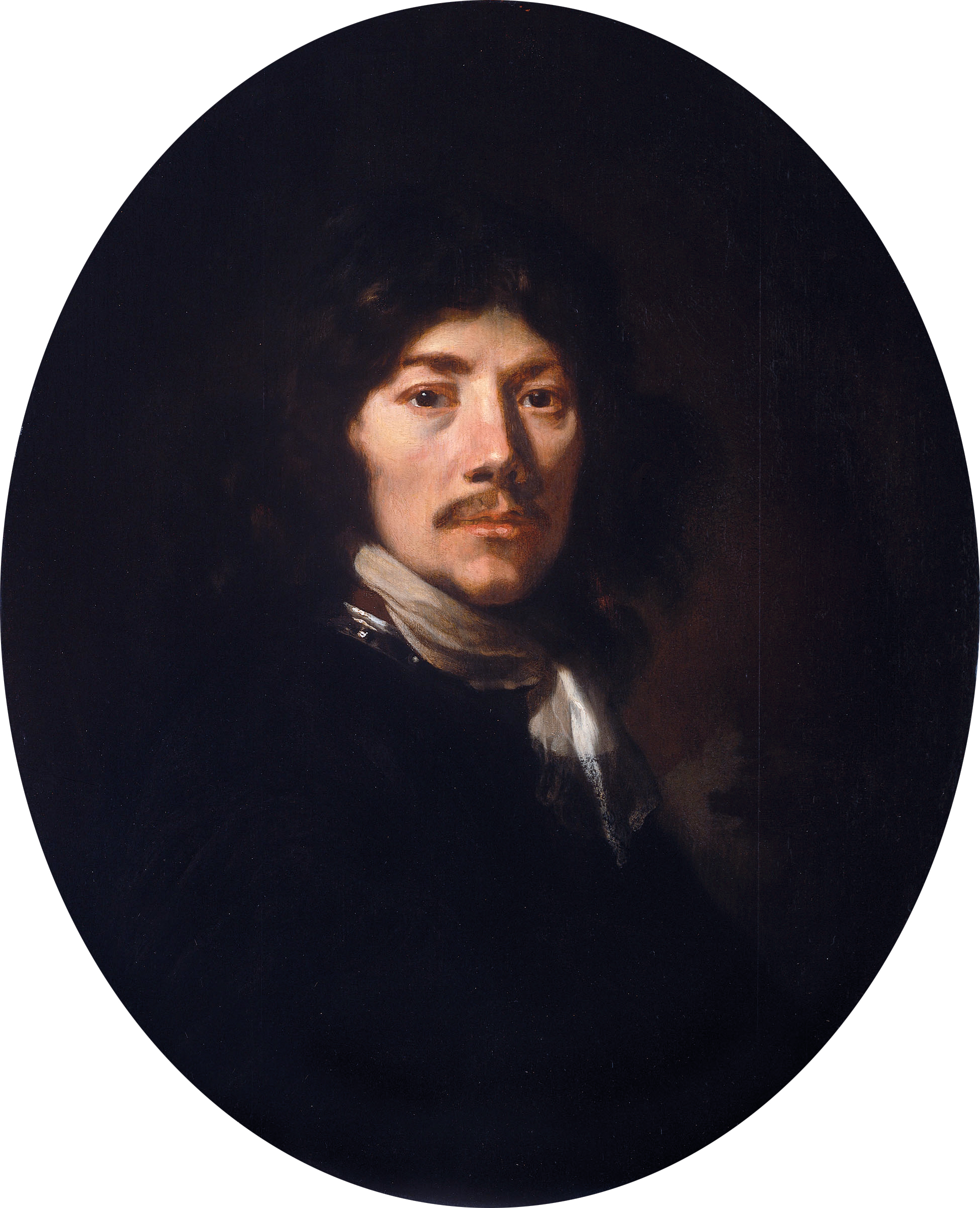
- Self-portrait of Jacob van Loo, c. 1660
- Born: 1614; Sluis, Dutch Republic
- Died: 26 November 1670 (aged 55–56); Paris, France
- Occupation: Painter

Jacob van Loo (1614 – 26 November 1670) was a painter of the Dutch Golden Age, chiefly active in Amsterdam and, after 1660, in Paris. Van Loo is known for his conversational groupings; particularly his mythological and biblical scenes generally attributed to the genre of History painting. He was especially celebrated for the quality of his nudes to the extent that, during his lifetime, particularly his female figures were said to have been considered superior and more popular than those of his Amsterdam contemporary and competitor Rembrandt. Unlike Rembrandt, he drew these nudes on blue paper. In 1663, three years after fleeing to Paris, Jacob van Loo was accepted into the Académie royale de peinture et de sculpture.

Though his father also painted, Jacob's success ensured that he would forever be referred to as the founder of the Van Loo family of painters; a dynasty which was influential in French and European painting from the 17th to the beginning of the 19th century.

== Biography ==
Van Loo was born in Sluis, a town in the Dutch Republic. Some sources have speculated that his father, Jan van Loo, may have been a notary, but more often his father is described as a painter from whom Jacob van Loo received his early training. Little is known of van Loo's early history due to the destruction of the city archives in Sluis during World War II. His early influences are said to have included Thomas de Keyser and Jacob Adriaensz Backer.

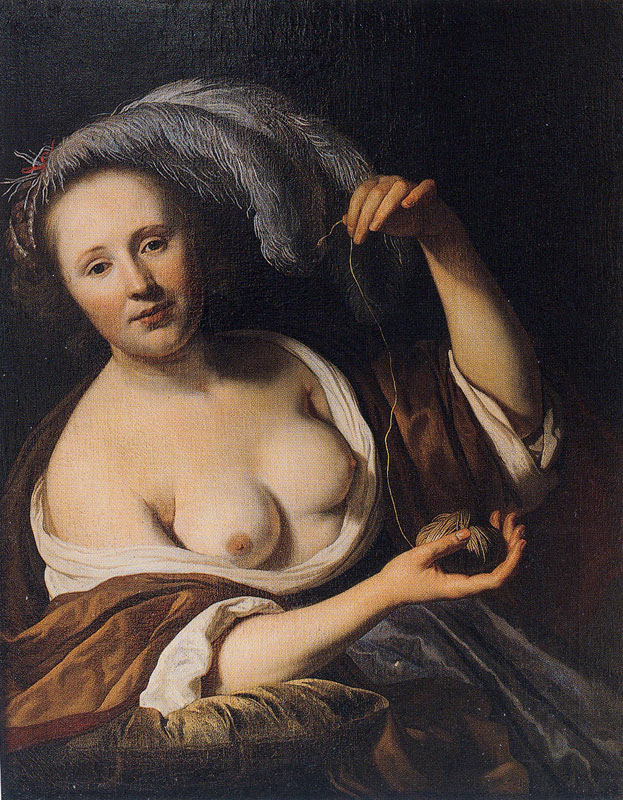
Ariadne (1652). Wilanów Palace, Warsaw

=== Family life ===
In 1635, van Loo moved to Amsterdam, In 1642 he married Anna Lengele, the sister of the painter Martinus Lengele (1604–1668). The couple had six children, including the painters Jean van Loo and his better known brother Louis-Abraham van Loo. Their grandsons, Jean-Baptiste van Loo and Charles-André van Loo were among the most famous French painters of the 18th century. They lived on Rozengracht in the Jordaan district of Amsterdam.

=== Professional practice ===
In Amsterdam, van Loo found himself at the centre of an active and competitive circle of artists, which included Rembrandt, Frans Hals and Bartholomeus van der Helst. Around 1640 Eglon van der Neer entered his studio as an apprentice and remained his student for a decade. In 1652 van Loo bought himself citizenship (burgerrecht) of the city of Amsterdam. It was speculated that he did so in the hope of being commissioned to help decorate the newly constructed town hall. In 1654, a poem by Jan Vos counted van Loo among the most significant of Dutch painters, alongside Rembrandt and van der Helst.

The greater part of van Loo's oeuvre was done in the Baroque style that had originated in Rome and had been popularised throughout Europe. He is often referred to as a major influence on Johannes Vermeer, evidence of which can be seen by comparing Vermeer's painting of Diana and Her Companions with van Loo's 1648 version of the same subject (not the 1654 version of Diana and her nymphs often used to dispute the claim of direct influence.)

Van Loo painted many portraits. Among his subjects were Johan Huydecoper van Maarseveen; his sister, Leonara Huydecoper, who was married to Jan J. Hinlopen; Joan Ortt, who was later involved with Antoinette Bourignon; and his wife Lucretia Boudaen.

=== Flight to Paris ===
In 1660, van Loo fled from Amsterdam after fatally stabbing someone during an altercation at an inn. He was sentenced to death in absentia which forever prevented his return to the Dutch Republic. Van Loo settled in Paris, where, in 1663, he was admitted to the Académie de peinture et de sculpture. He died in Paris in 1670, three years after the van Loo family were naturalised as French citizens.

== Gallery ==
Works by Jacob van Loo

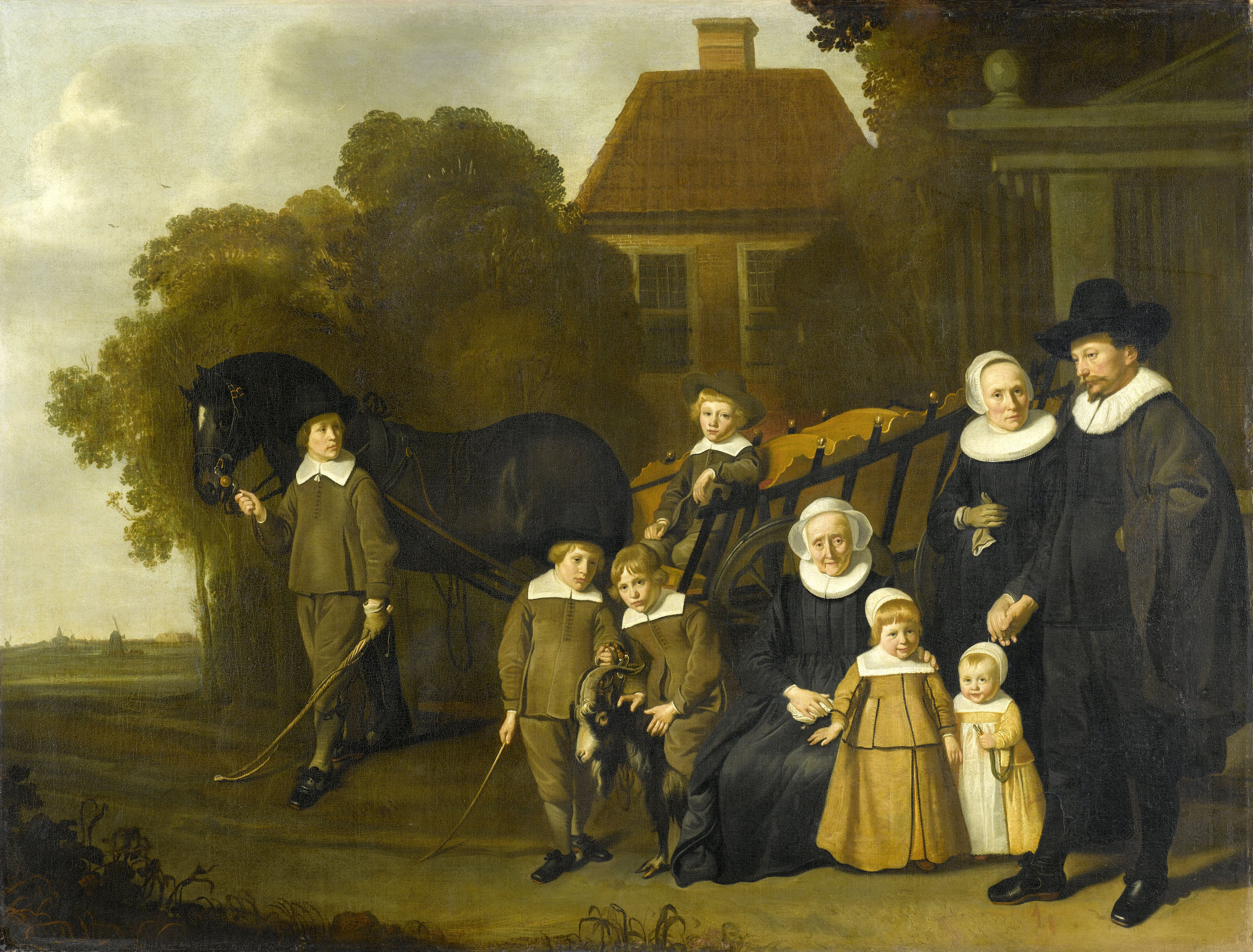
Meebeeck Cruywagen Family, c. 1640-45.

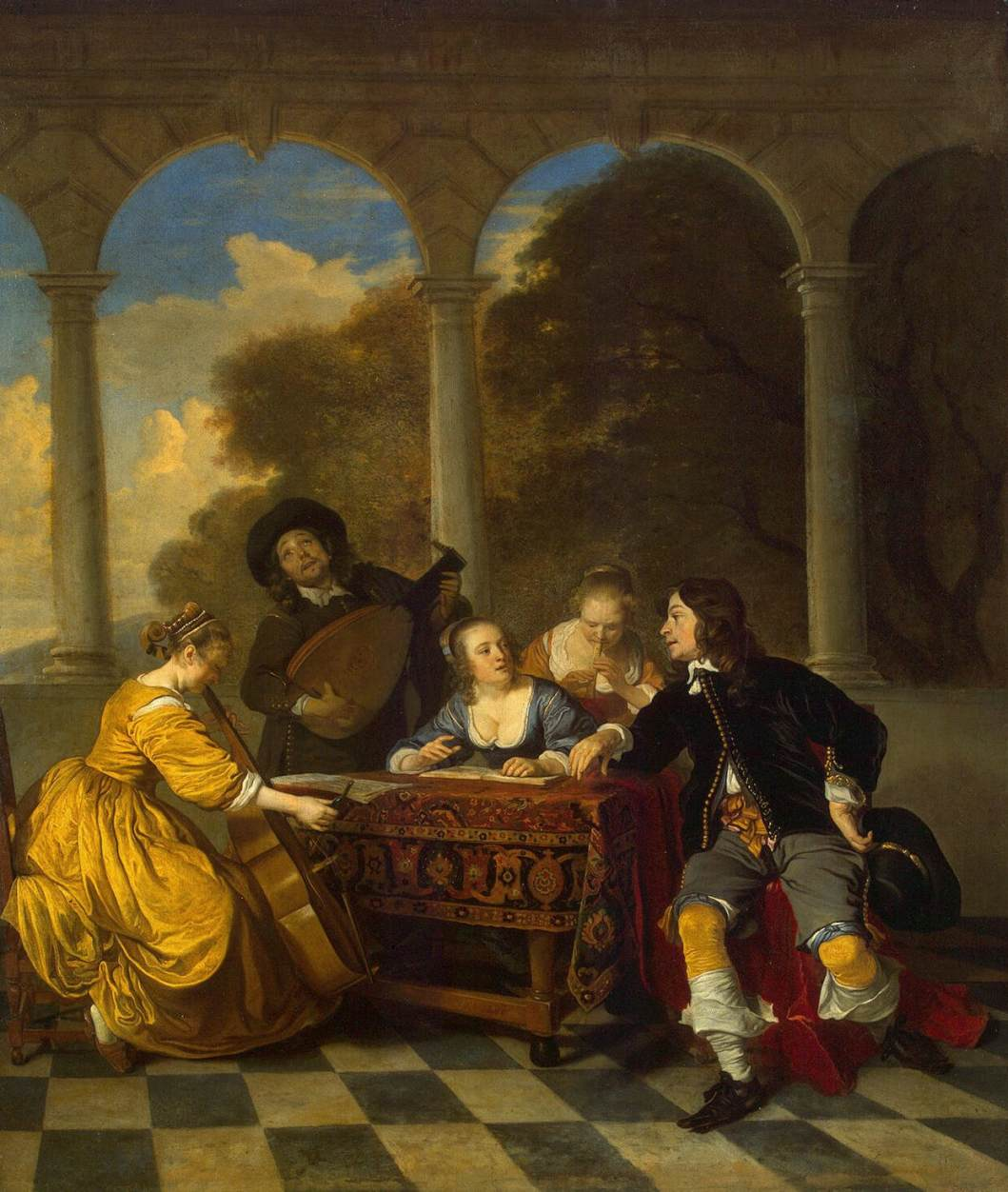
A concert, 1652.

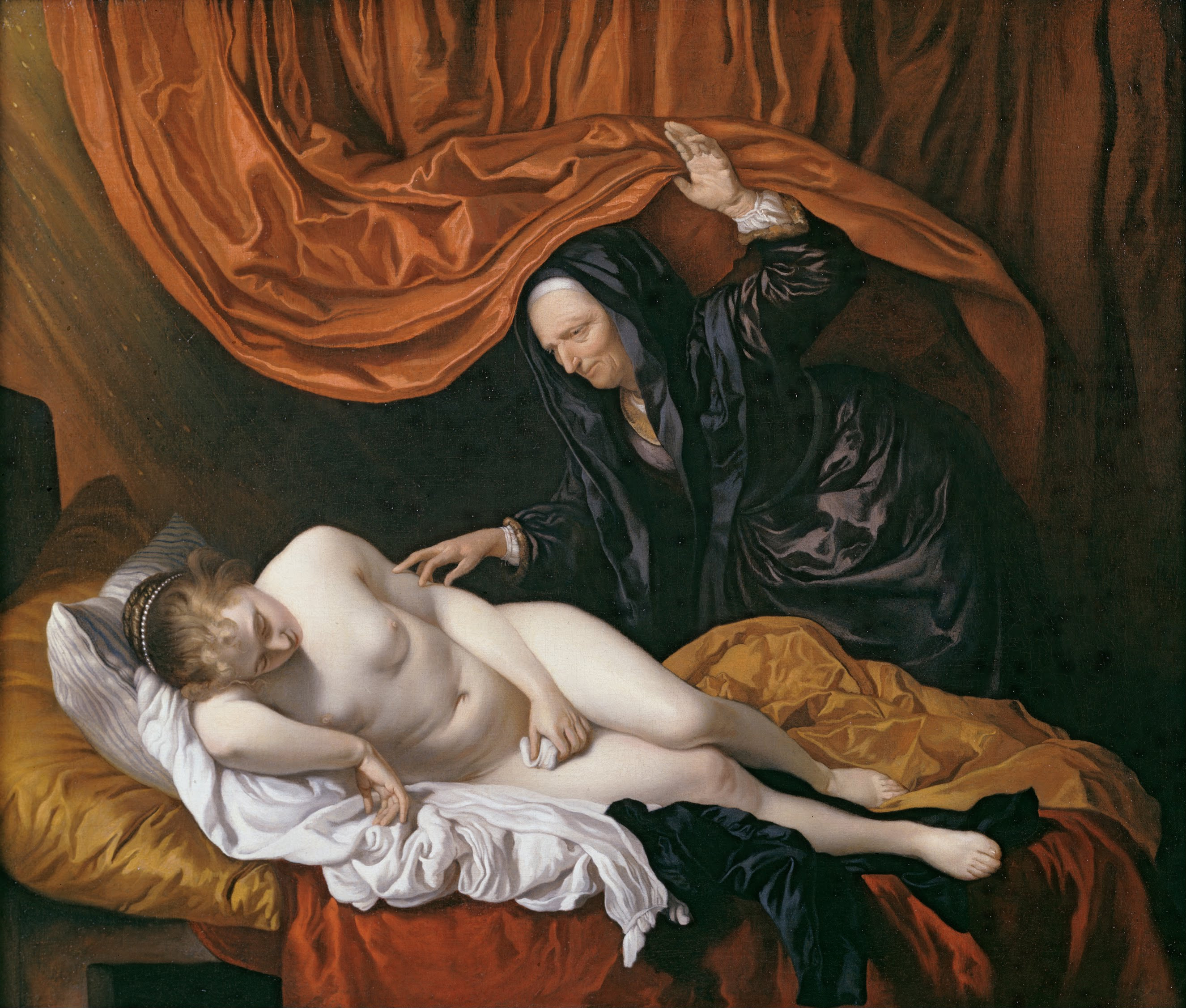
Danaë, after 1640.

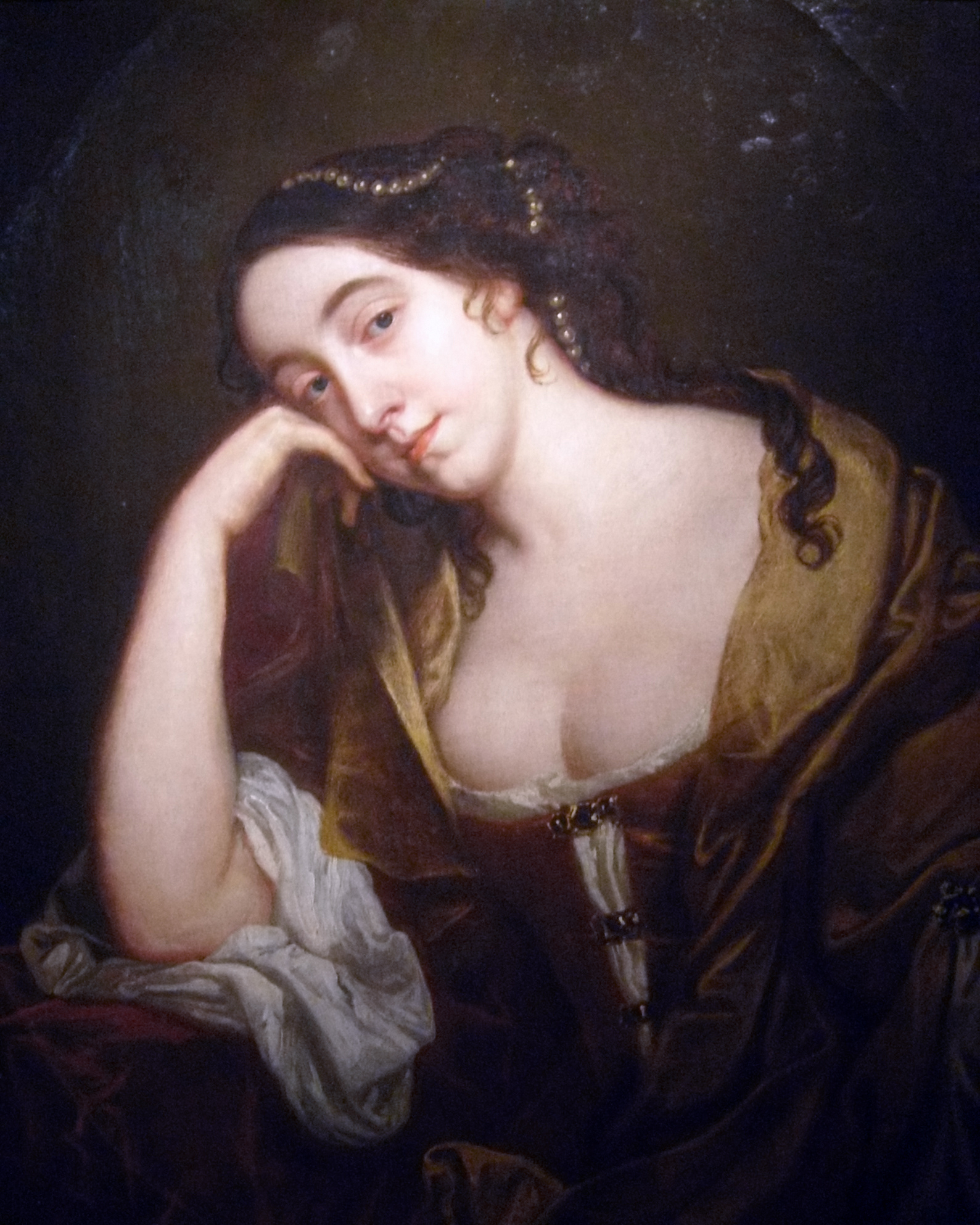
Melancholy, after 1660.

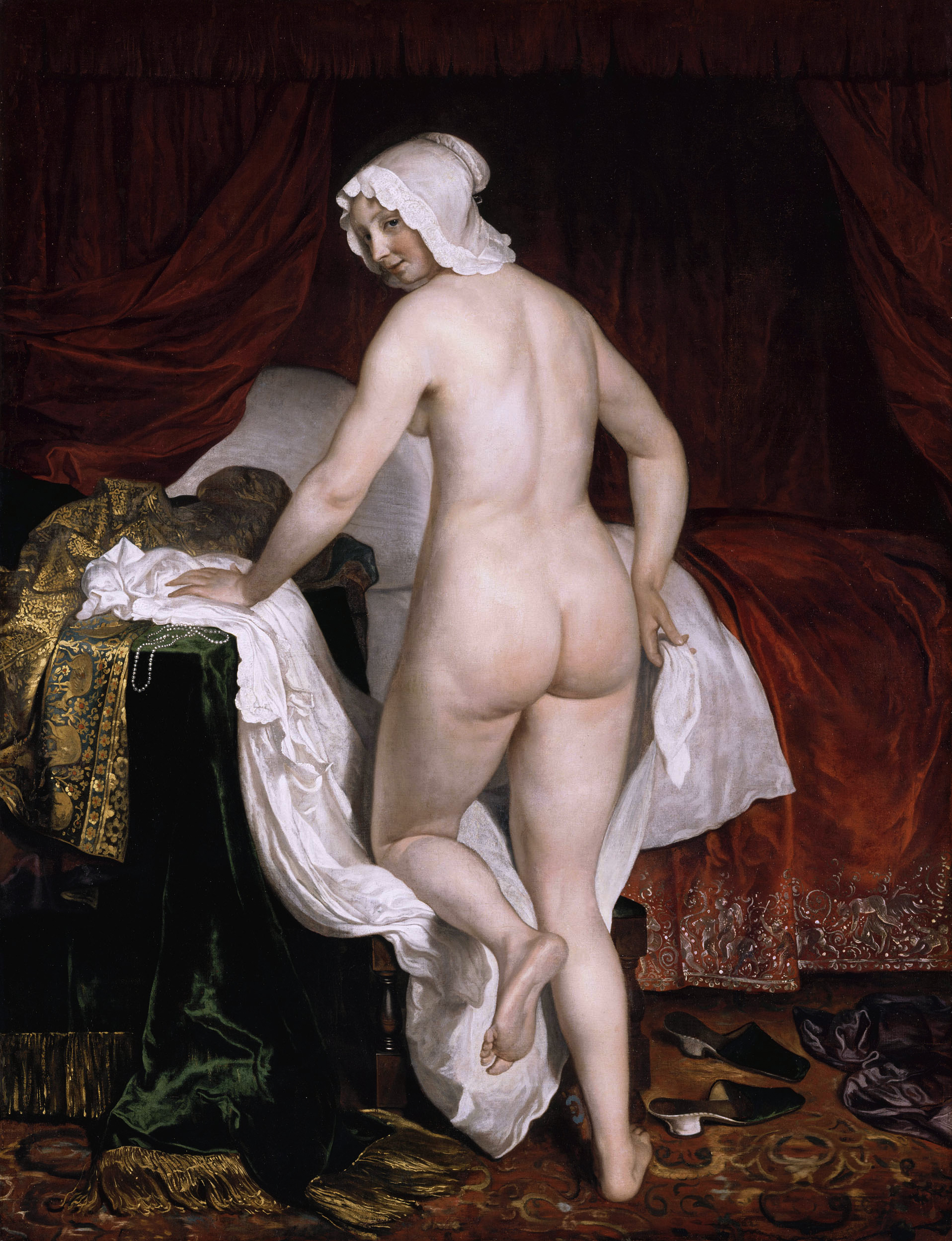
Young woman going to bed, c. 1650.

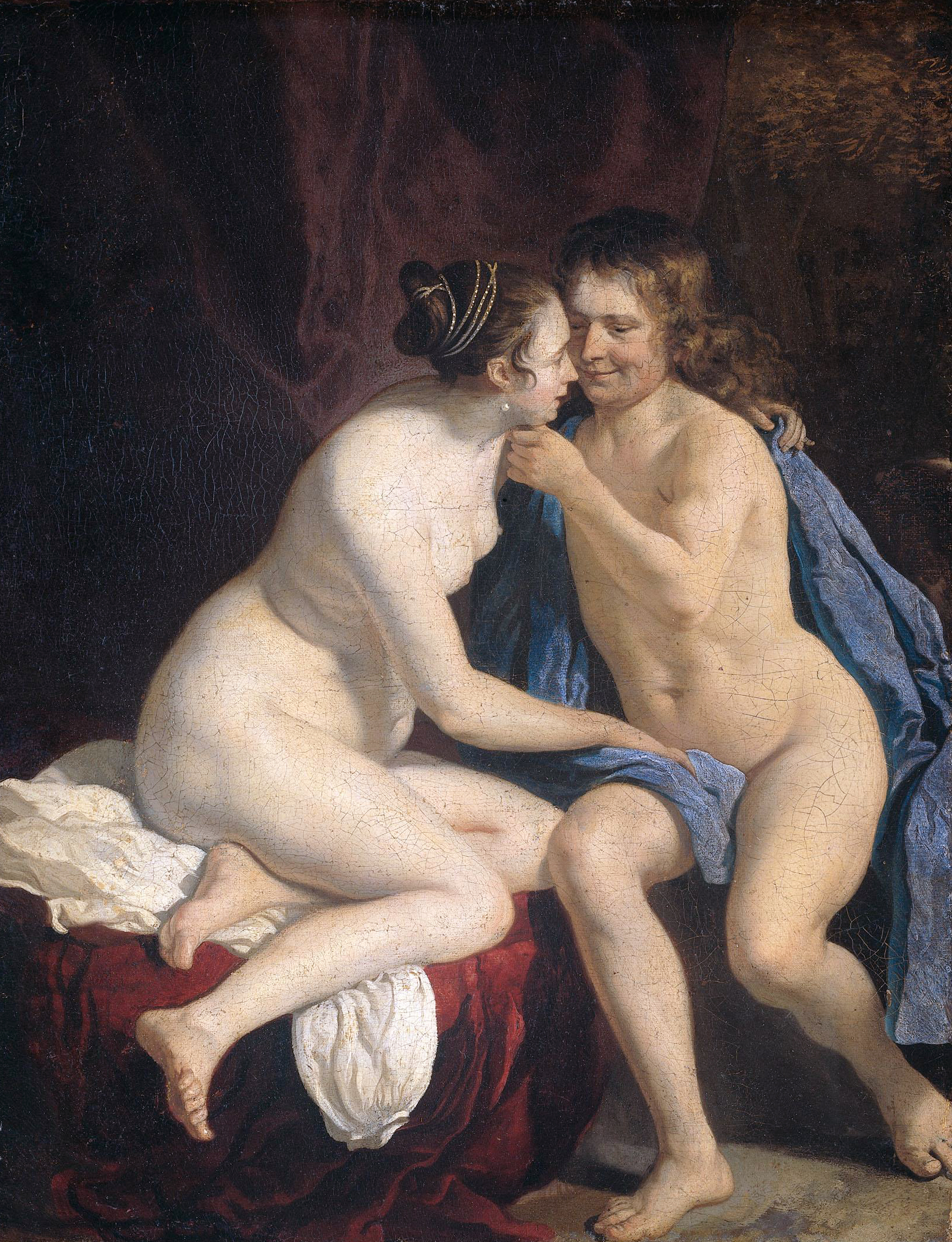
Male and Female nudes, 1650s.

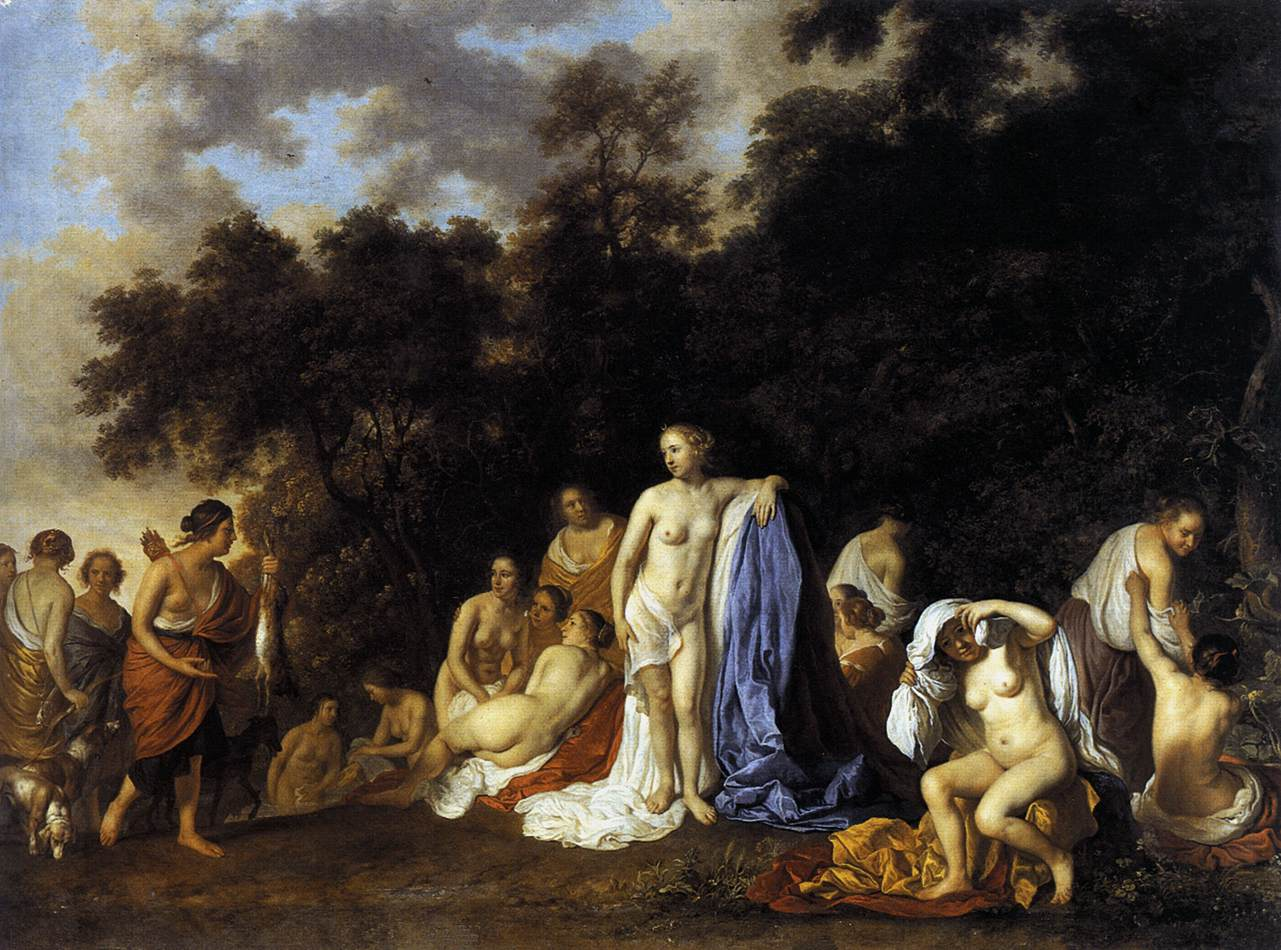
Diana and her Nymphs, 1654.

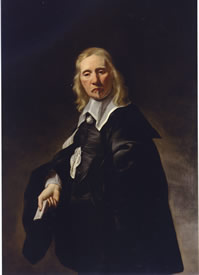
Portrait of a gentleman, 1668.

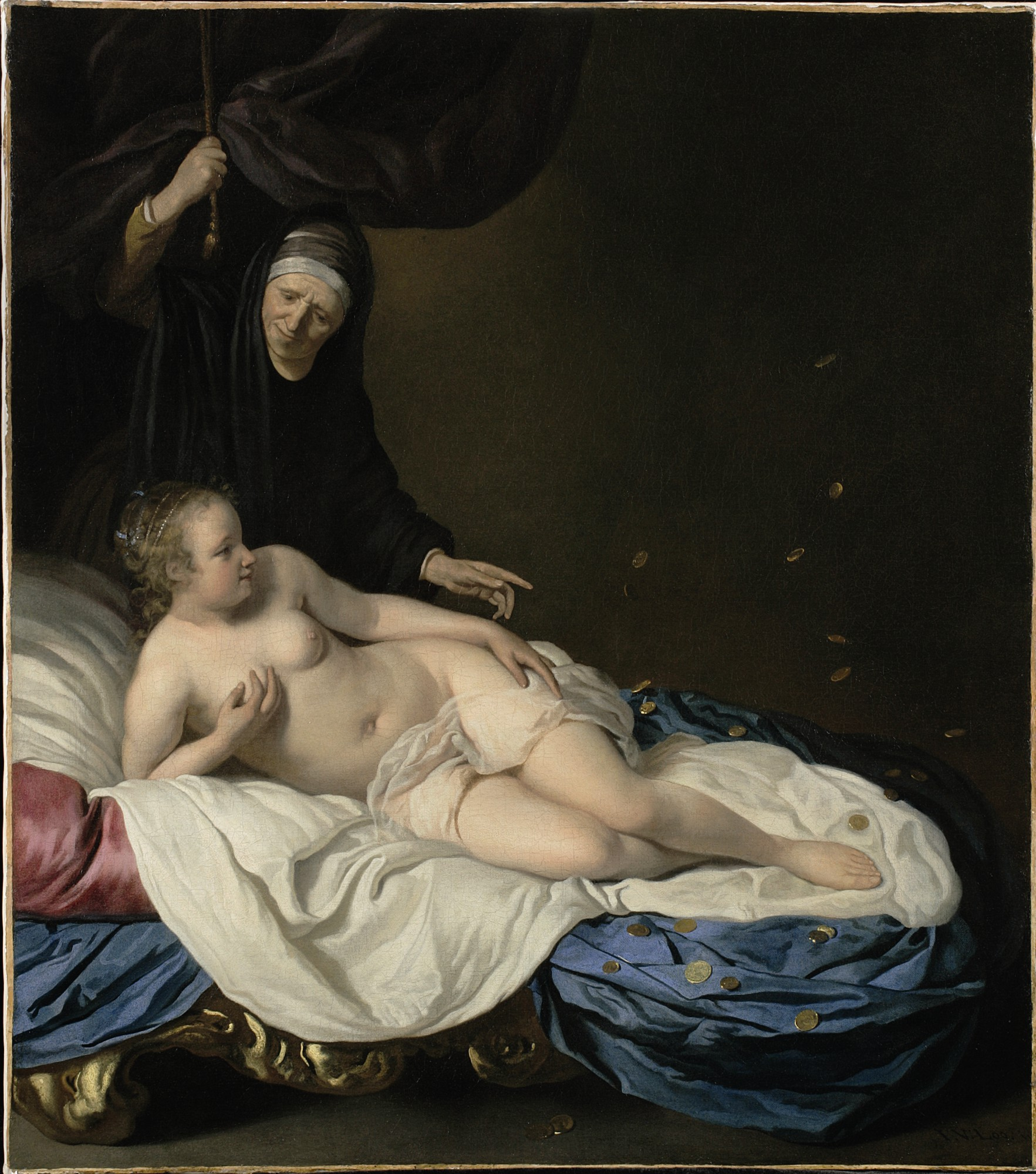
Danae, 1650.

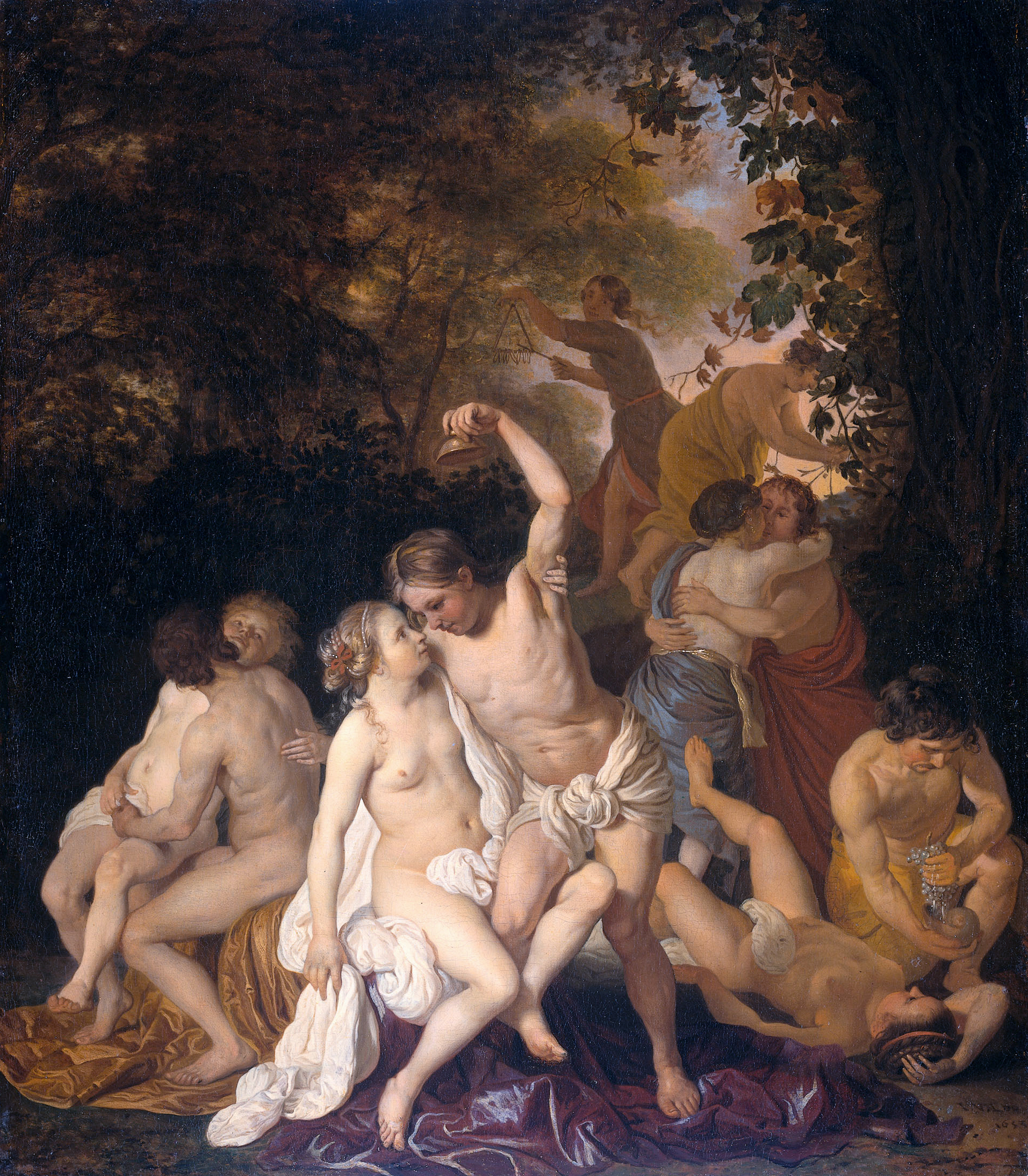
Bacchic Scene, 1653.

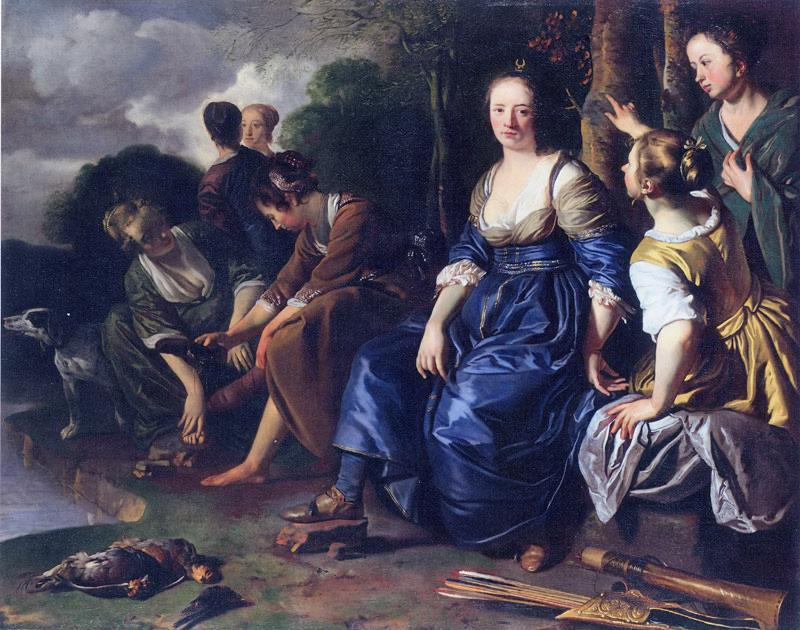
Diana and her nymphs, 1648.

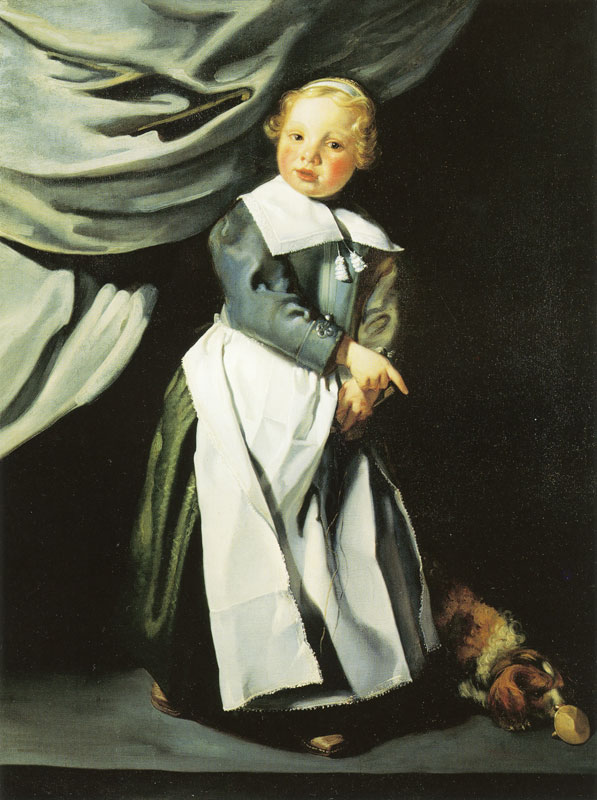
Boy with Top and Dog, c. 1650-1655

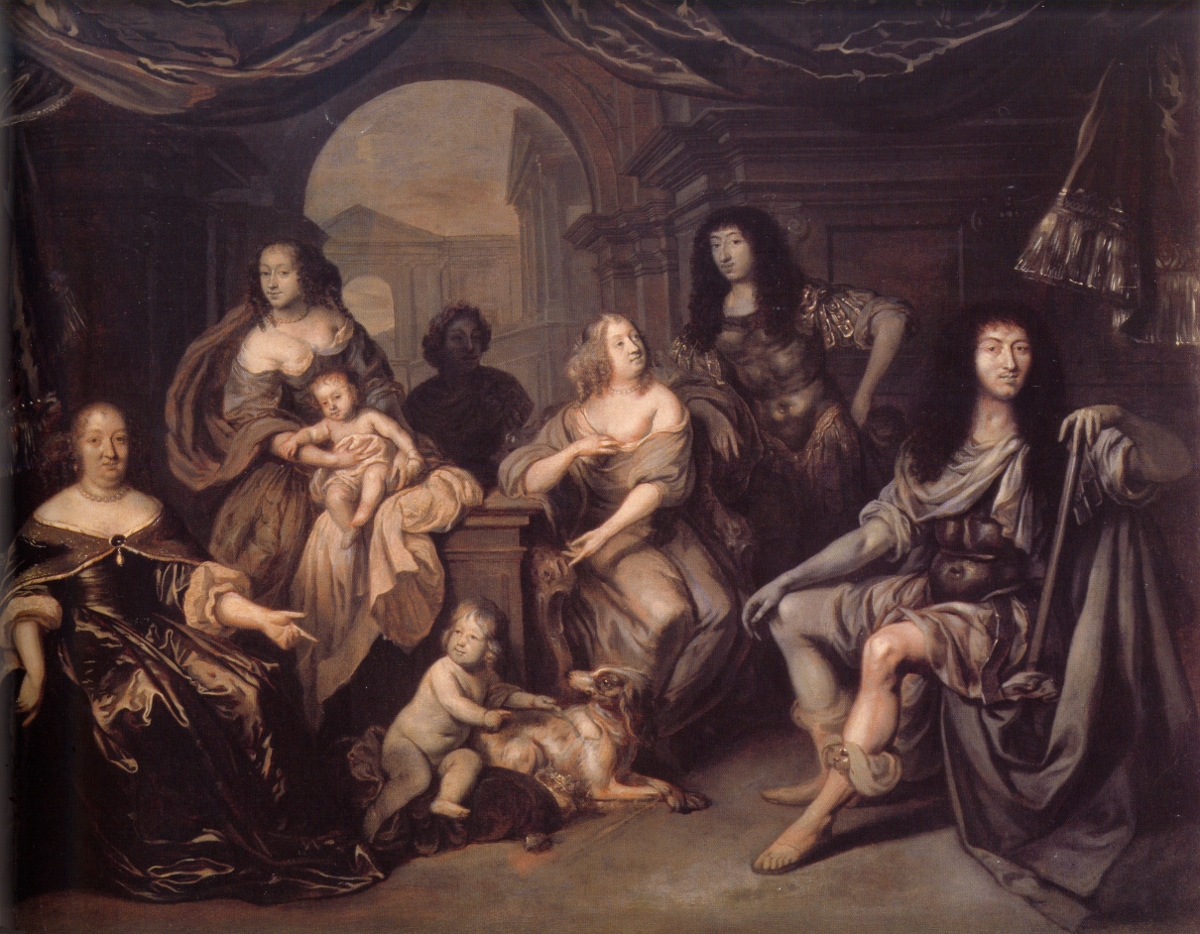
The French Royal Family in circa 1663.

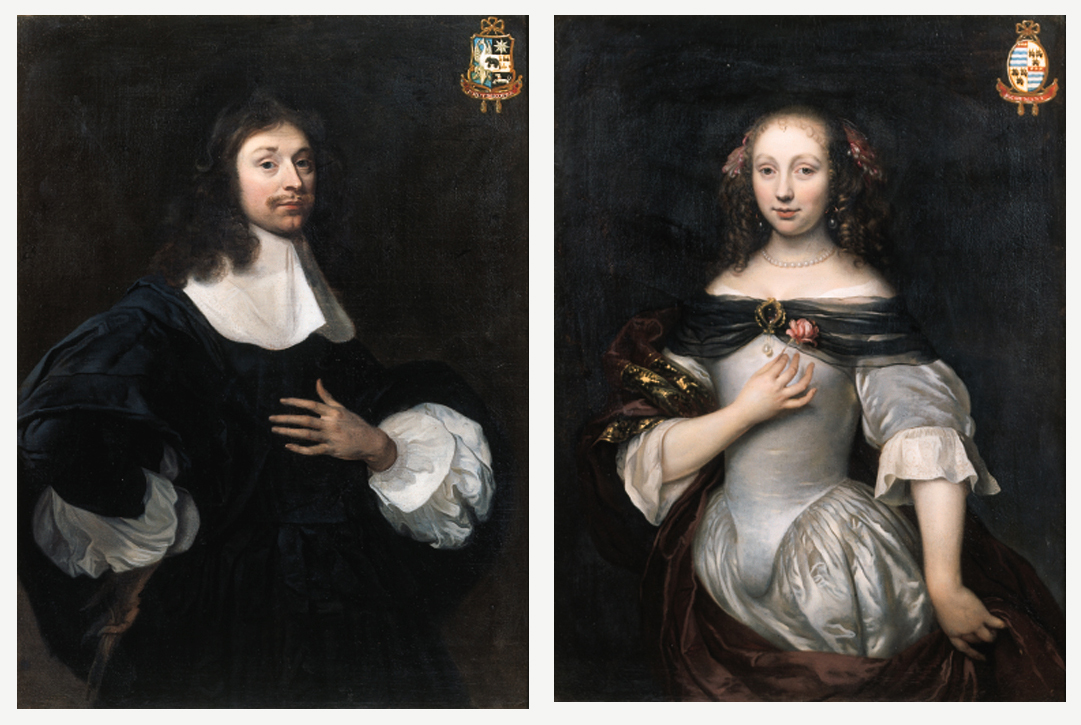
Joan Huydecoper and his wife.

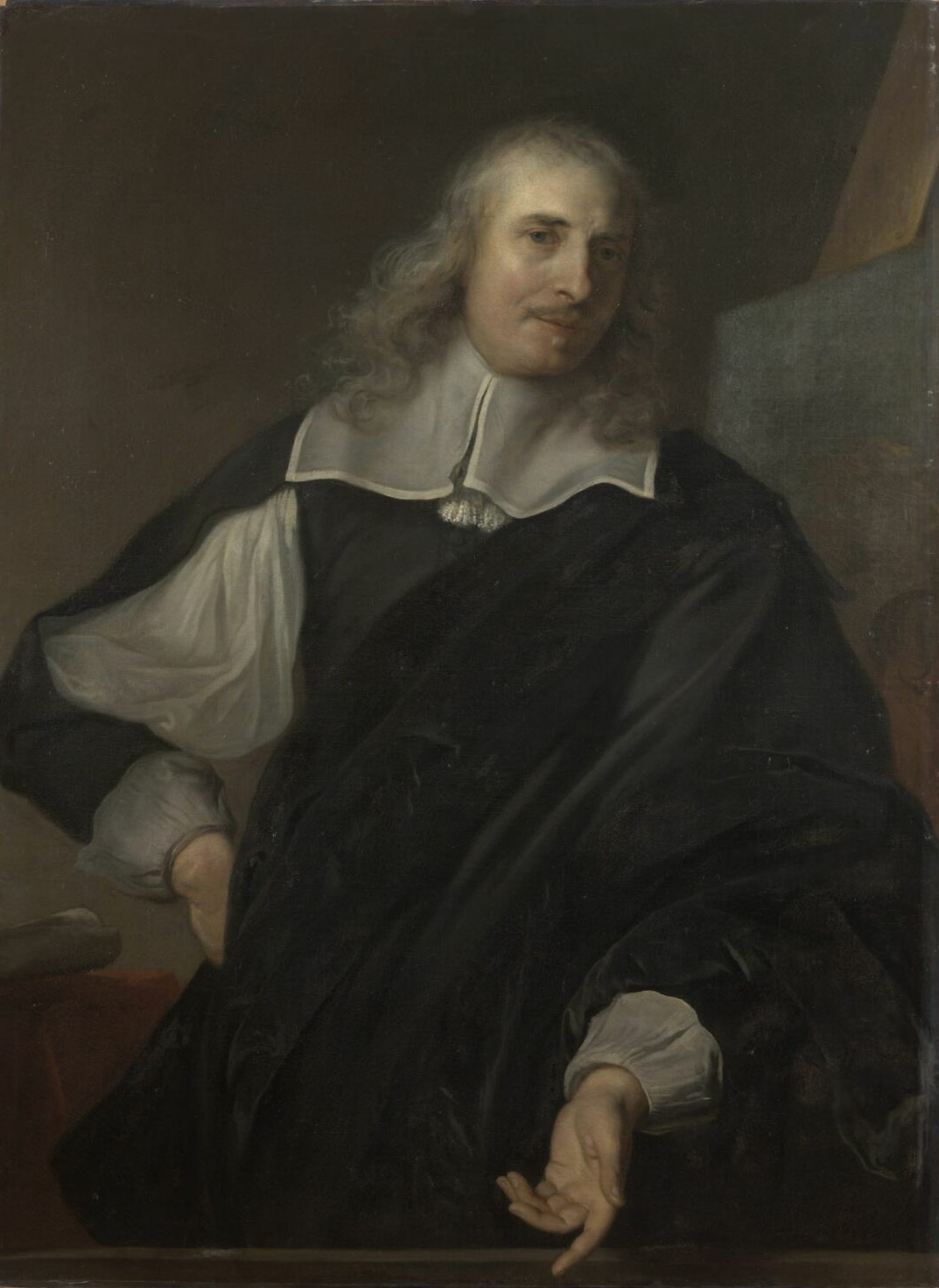
Portrait of Michel Corneille the Elder, van Loo's reception piece to the Académie, c. 1662
