= Martinus Lengele =

Dutch Golden Age painter

- Born: 1615
- Died: 27 May 1668 (aged 52–53); Paris

Martinus Lengele (1615 – 27 May 1668) was a Dutch Golden Age painter.

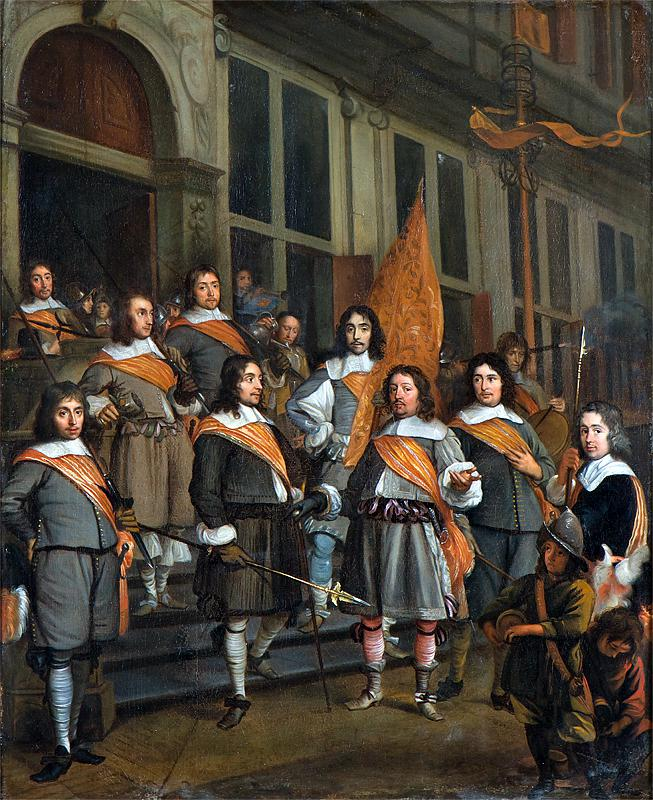
The Officers of the Orange Banner in The Hague, 1660, Haags Historisch Museum

He is known for portraits in the Hague, and made a few schutterstukken there. He became a member of the Confrerie Pictura in The Hague from 1656 to 1665. In 1642, his sister Anna married the painter Jacob van Loo, who like him, worked in Paris in the 1660s.

Lengele died in Paris.
