= Cirque de la Symphonie =

Touring circus troupe

Logo of the Cirque de la Symphonie

Cirque de la Symphonie is a touring circus troupe based in Athens, Georgia, first incorporated in 2005 by William H. Allen and Alexander Streltsov. Its performances involve a variety of minimalist contemporary circus acts synchronized to the music of a live symphony orchestra. Reception to the Cirque has been positive both commercially and critically, with shows typically selling out and being positively reviewed by critics.

== History ==
Allen first conceived of the idea of pairing circus arts with fine art in the 1990s while travelling in Russia and working with Russian circus performers. There, he recruited Streltsov to work with him in the United States. Beginning in 1991, Allen began staging shows featuring circus performers with local orchestras. In 1998, the pair collaborated with Erich Kunzel of the Cincinnati Pops Orchestra to produce a show that paired an acrobat with a symphony orchestra. The show received a strong positive response, leading Allen and Streltsov to stage similar shows in a number of other states in the following years. The success of these shows led to Allen and Streltsov formally incorporating as Cirque de la Symphonie in 2005. Their first major show was with the Houston Symphony. The circus, currently based in Athens, Georgia, is now solely owned by Streltsov. Stretslov functions as its president and managing director.

== Performances ==
Cirque de la Symphonie performs exclusively with live symphony orchestras, with circus acts synced to the orchestra's music. Cirque de la Symphonie has performed with over 100 orchestras across the world, including performances in Malaysia and Hong Kong. The intent of Cirque de la Symphonie performances is to add an additional dimension to the music by providing a visual element choreographed with the music, thereby enhancing both. To that end, the orchestra always performs on stage with the acrobats, never in an orchestra pit.

The music is selected in collaboration with each orchestra's conductor, and may include selections from the classical canon, excerpts from ballets, portions of movie soundtracks, and other pops orchestra standbys. Their performances are deliberately minimalist, rarely featuring more than two performers on stage at any given time, and avoiding "heavy, gaudy costuming" in order to give equal prominence to the music. Cirque de la Symphonie acts are distinctively adapted to very tight spaces compared to traditional circus performances, which typically take place on larger, more open stages. In contrast, Cirque acts are often constrained to performing in spaces no more than twelve to fifteen feet wide, in concert halls not engineered for aerial performances.

=== Performers ===
Cirque de la Symphonie has featured a variety of different circus acts and performers over the years.

- Ekaterina Borzikova: aerial platform, unknown–present
- Vitalii Buza: gymnastics and aerialism, 2014–present
- Aloysia Gavre: aerial hoop, 2008–present
- Jarek & Darek: hand-balancing, 2005–present
- Vitaliy Korshunov: acrobatics, unknown–present
- Janice Martin: aerialism with violin, unknown–present
- Andrey Moraru: hand-balancing and acrobatics, 2014–present
- Alexandra Pivaral: contortion, balancing, and hula hoops, unknown–present
- Pavel Prikhodko: aerial straps and acrobatics, unknown–present
- Alexander Streltsov: cube artistry and aerialism, 2005–December 2016
- Vladimir Tsarkov: juggling and mime, 2008–present
- Elena Tsarkova: contortion and quick-change, 2008–present
- Christine Van Loo: aerialist including aerial silks and aerial hoop, 2008–present

== Critical reception ==
Reception to the Cirque de la Symphonie has been both commercially and critically positive, with many orchestras booking re-engagements. The fusion of circus performance with orchestral music has been an attractant for audiences who may not typically attend the symphony. Allen has stated that "Cirque de la Symphonie has a reputation for selling out everywhere it goes, and many orchestras report record-setting attendance." Reviewers have generally been positive about the fusion of orchestral music with acrobatic performances; a 2014 Huffington Post review remarked that "Tchaikovsky’s waltz from Swan Lake is given a greater grandeur when the birds can leave the pond."

== Controversies ==
In January 2017, Cirque de la Symphonie co-founder and former co-owner William H. Allen pleaded guilty to charges of secretly photographing sexual or intimate parts of a child and possession of child pornography after secretly filming underage members of the Cirque de la Symphonie in their hotel rooms in 2015. He was sentenced to two years in state prison, followed by ten years of probation.
