= Charles-Amédée-Philippe van Loo =

French painter (1719–1795)

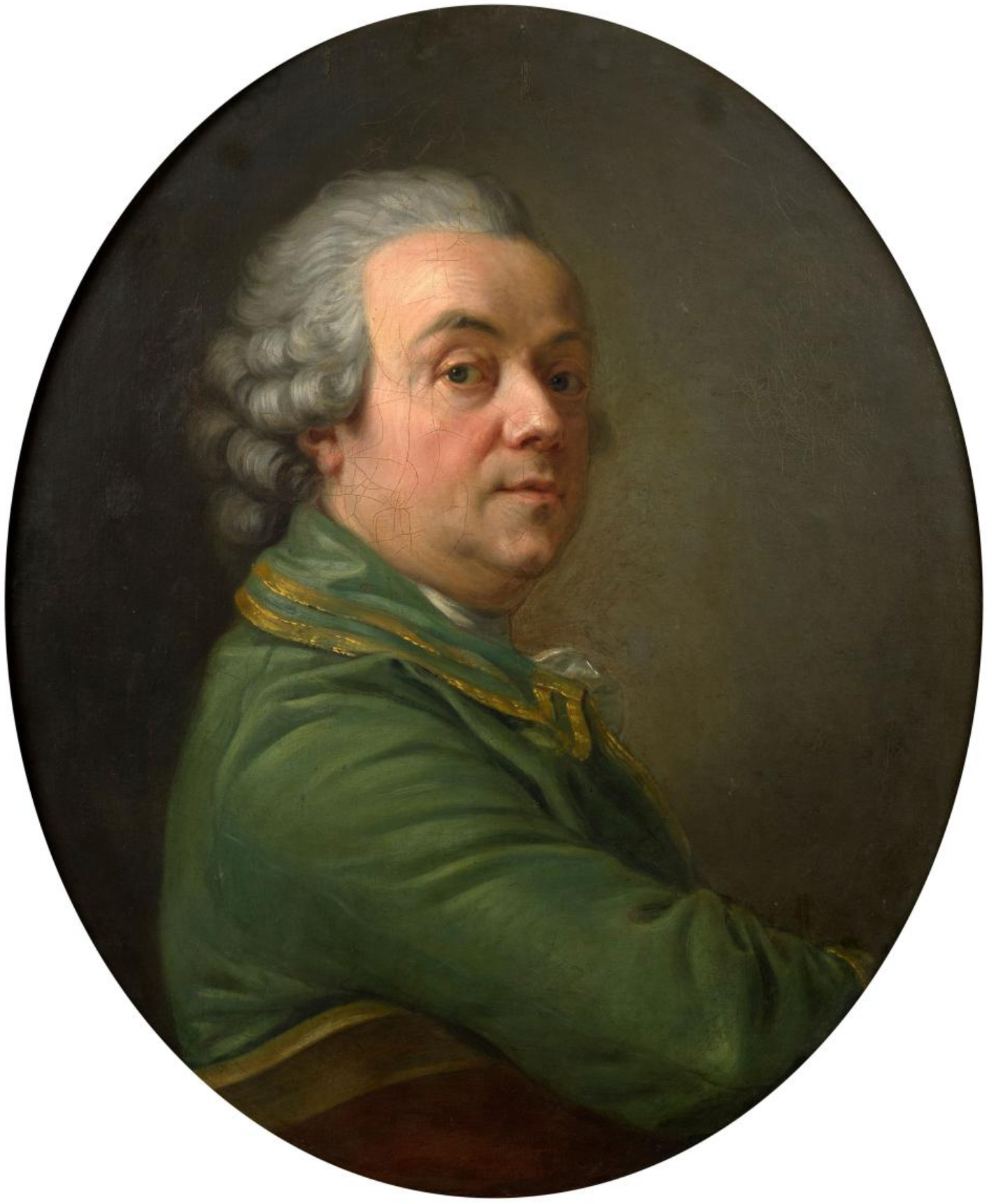
- Self portrait, c. 1790–1795
- Father: Jean-Baptiste van Loo
- Awards: Prix de Rome; 1738 Prix de Rome

Charles-Amédée-Philippe van Loo (25 August 1719 – 15 November 1795) was a French painter of allegorical scenes and portraits.

He studied under his father, the painter Jean-Baptiste van Loo, in Italy and in France, where in 1738 he won the Prix de Rome, then at Aix-en-Provence, before returning to Paris in 1745. He was invited to join the Académie Royale de Peinture et de Sculpture in 1747, and that year he married his cousin Marie-Marguerite Lebrun, daughter of the painter Michel Lebrun (died 1753).

He was the author of the only known real-life portrait of the Marquis de Sade.

Among his brothers were the painters François van Loo (1708–1732) and Louis-Michel van Loo (1707–1771).

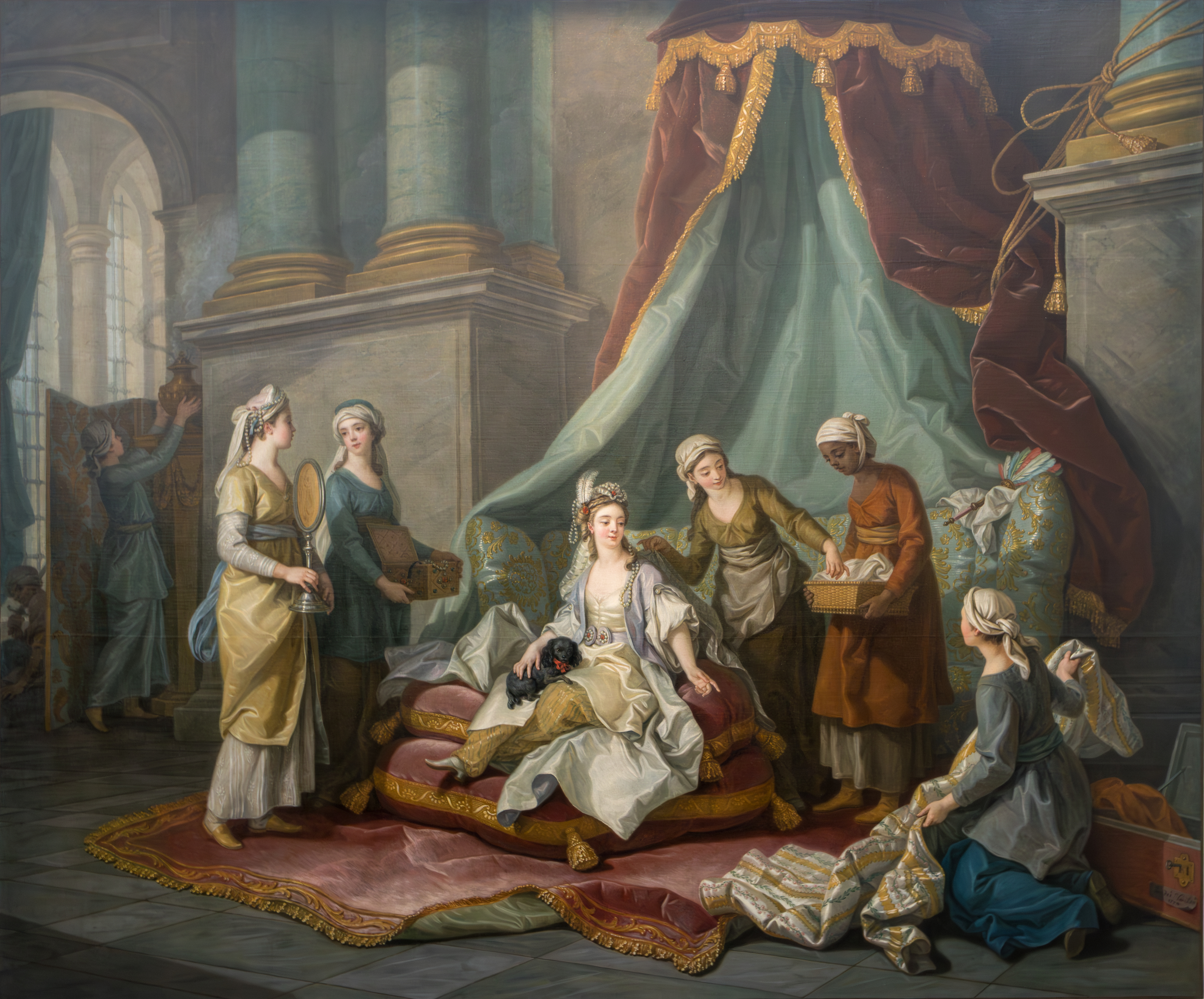
The Toilet of a Sultana, Louvre Museum
