= Christine Van Loo =

American acrobatic gymnast

Christine (Christina) Van Loo is an American aerialist and acrobat, and former champion acrobatic gymnast. She is a 7-time National Champion (Acrobatic Gymnastics - Mixed Pairs, 1983–89), She was named the 1988 Olympic Female Athlete of the Year for Sports Acrobatics and named the Athlete of the Decade for the 1980s by the U.S. Sports Acrobatics Federation. She was inducted into the USSA (acro-gymnastics) Hall of Fame and the World Acrobatics Society Gallery of Honor.

Currently, she is a professional aerialist and an acrobat. She has toured with Paul McCartney's European tour, performed in two Grammy Award ceremonies, the Winter Olympics, the American Music Awards, and the Miss Universe pageant. She choreographed the aerials for Britney Spears' world tour and the Stars on Ice U.S. tour.

She has performed in the 2002 Winter Olympics; at two Grammy Awards with No Doubt and Ricky Martin and at the American Music Awards with Aerosmith, the Miss Universe pageant and Paul McCartney's European tour as well as several feature films, television shows and music videos. She worked as a trainer on the television show Celebrity Circus. Since 2008, Van Loo has performed with Cirque de la Symphonie.
