= Jean-Baptiste van Loo =

French painter (1684–1745)

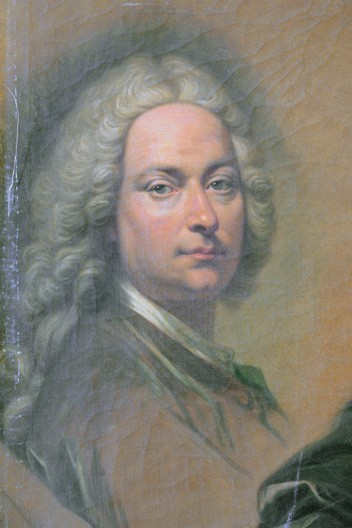
- Portrait by Louis-Michel van Loo, 1762
- Born: 11 January 1684; Aix-en-Provence, Province of Provence, France
- Died: 19 December 1745 (aged 61); Aix-en-Provence, France
- Children: Louis-Michel, Charles-Amedee-Philippe, and 1 other
- Parent(s): Louis-Abraham van Loo (father); Marie Fossé (mother)

Jean-Baptiste van Loo (14 January 1684 – 19 December 1745) was a French portrait painter.

== Life and career ==
He was born in Aix-en-Provence, and was instructed in art by his father Louis-Abraham van Loo, son of Jacob van Loo. Having at an early age executed several pictures for the decoration of the church and public buildings at Aix, he was employed on similar work at Toulon, which he was forced to leave during the siege of 1707.

He was patronized by Emmanuel Philibert, Prince of Carignano, who sent him to Rome, where he studied under Benedetto Luti. He was much employed painting for churches in Rome, and in particular executed a greatly praised Scourging of Christ for the church of Santa Maria in Monticelli. At Turin he painted Charles Emmanuel II, Duke of Savoy and several members of his court. Then, moving to Paris, where he was elected a member of the Académie royale de peinture et de sculpture, he executed various altar-pieces and restored the works of Francesco Primaticcio at the Palace of Fontainebleau. He also painted portraits of aristocrats living in or visiting Paris, including a young William Murray who later went on to be a friend and regular client as the 1st Earl of Mansfield.

In 1737 he went to England, where he attracted attention by his portrait of Colley Cibber and of Owen McSwiny, the theatrical manager; the latter, like many other of van Loo's works, was engraved in mezzotint by John Faber the Younger. He also painted Sir Robert Walpole, whose portrait by van Loo in his robes as chancellor of the exchequer is in the National Portrait Gallery, London, and the Prince and Princess of Wales. He did not, however, practice long in England, because of his failing health; he retired to Paris in 1742, and afterwards to Aix-en-Provence, where he died on 19 December 1745. His likenesses were striking and faithful, but seldom flattering, and his heads are forcible in coloring.

== Selected works ==
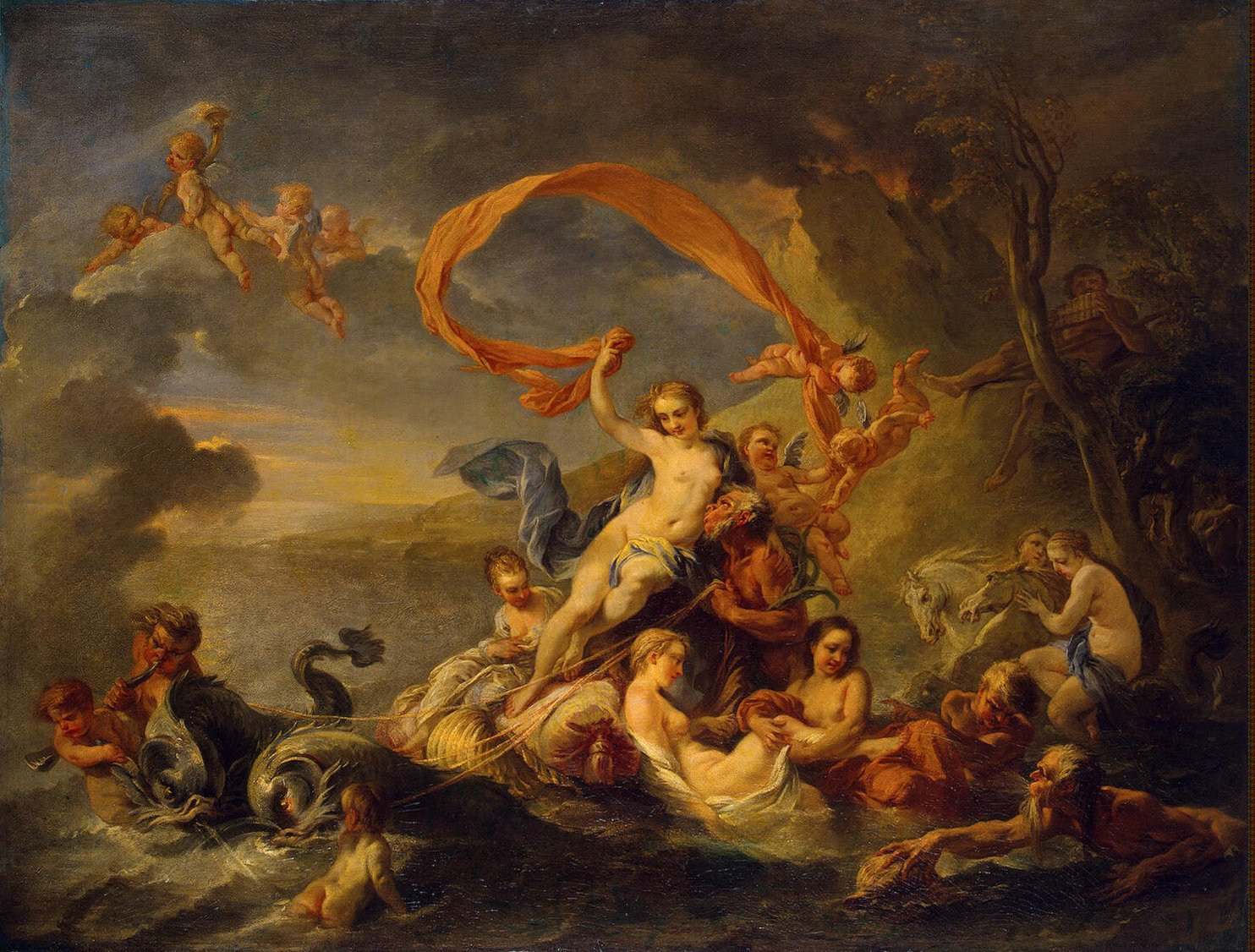
The Triumph of Galatea, 1720 (Hermitage Museum).

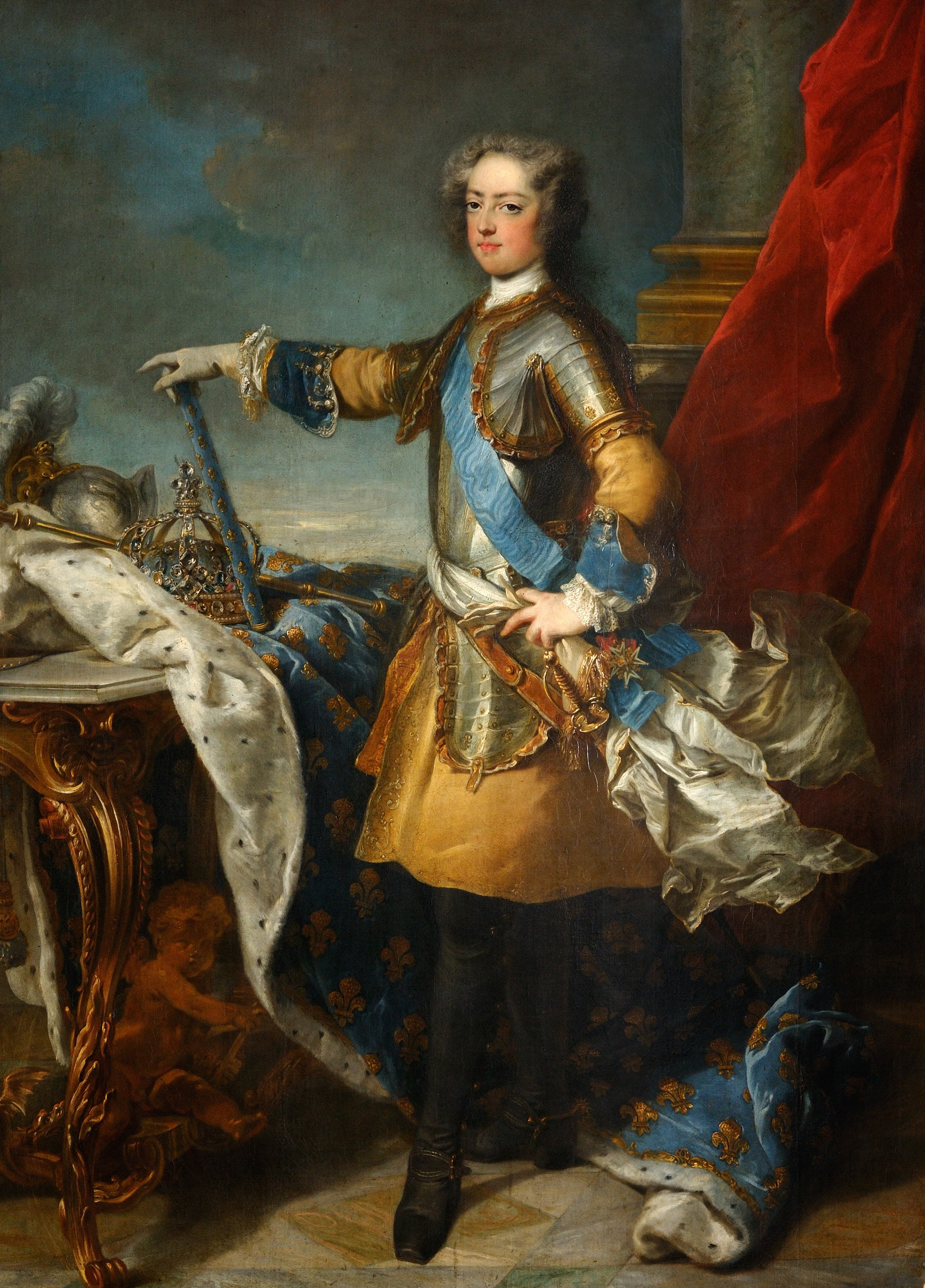
Louis XV, King of France and Navarre, c. 1723 (Palace of Versailles).

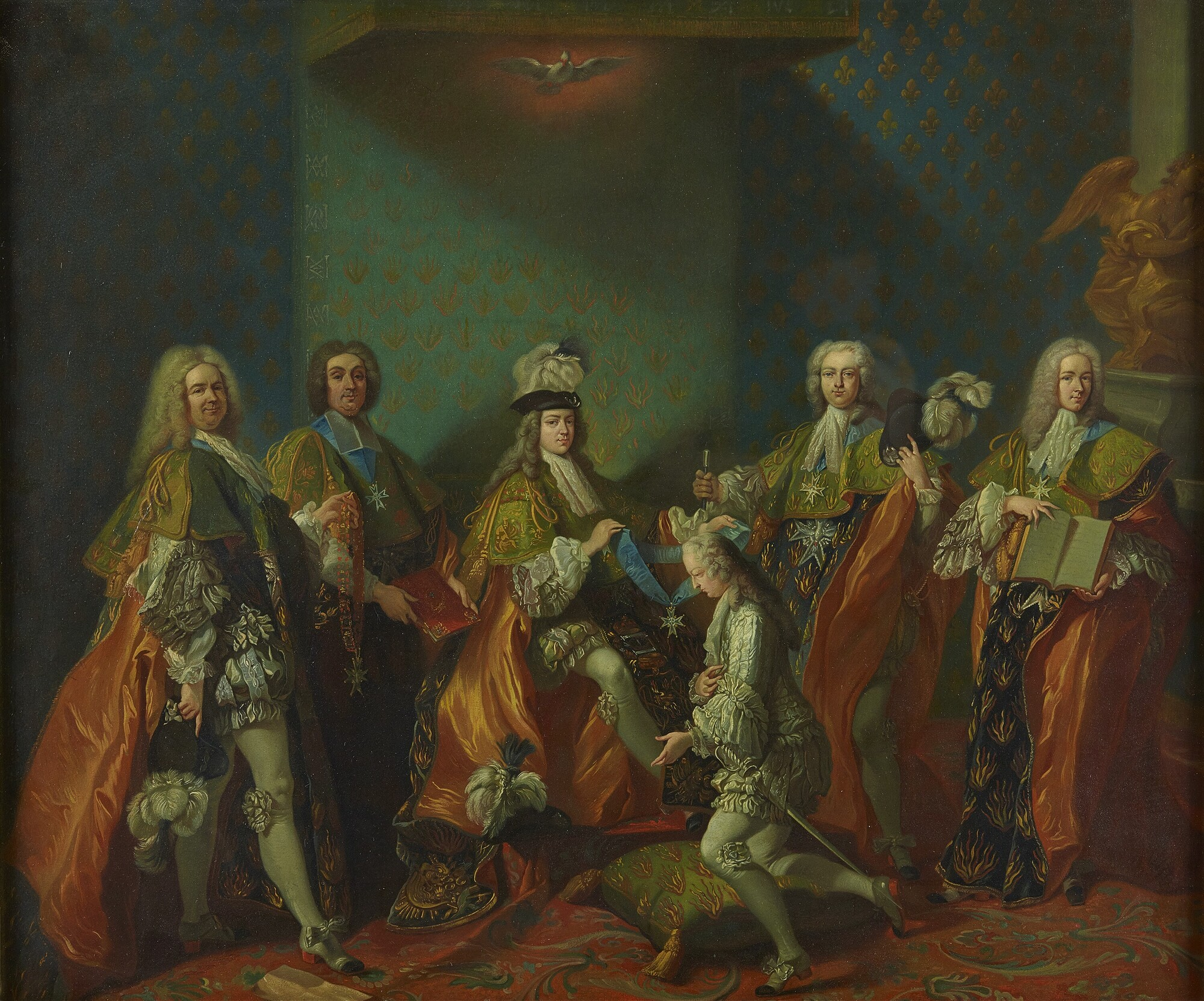
Louis XV Conferring the Order of the Holy Spirit on the Count de Clermont, 1730 (Palace of Versailles).

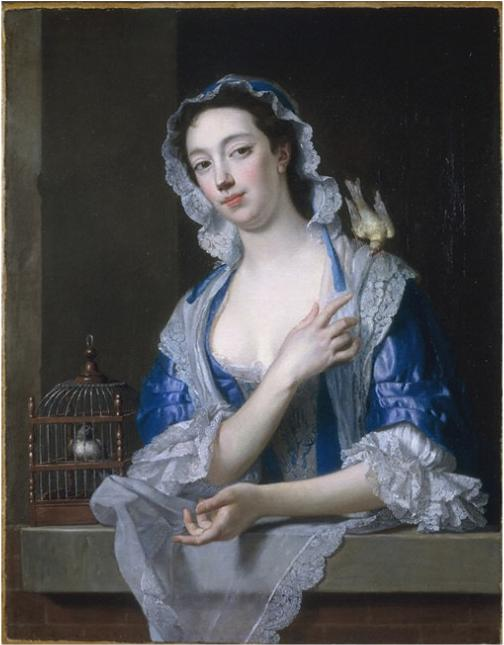
Margaret ('Peg') Woffington, Actress, c. 1738 (Victoria & Albert Museum).

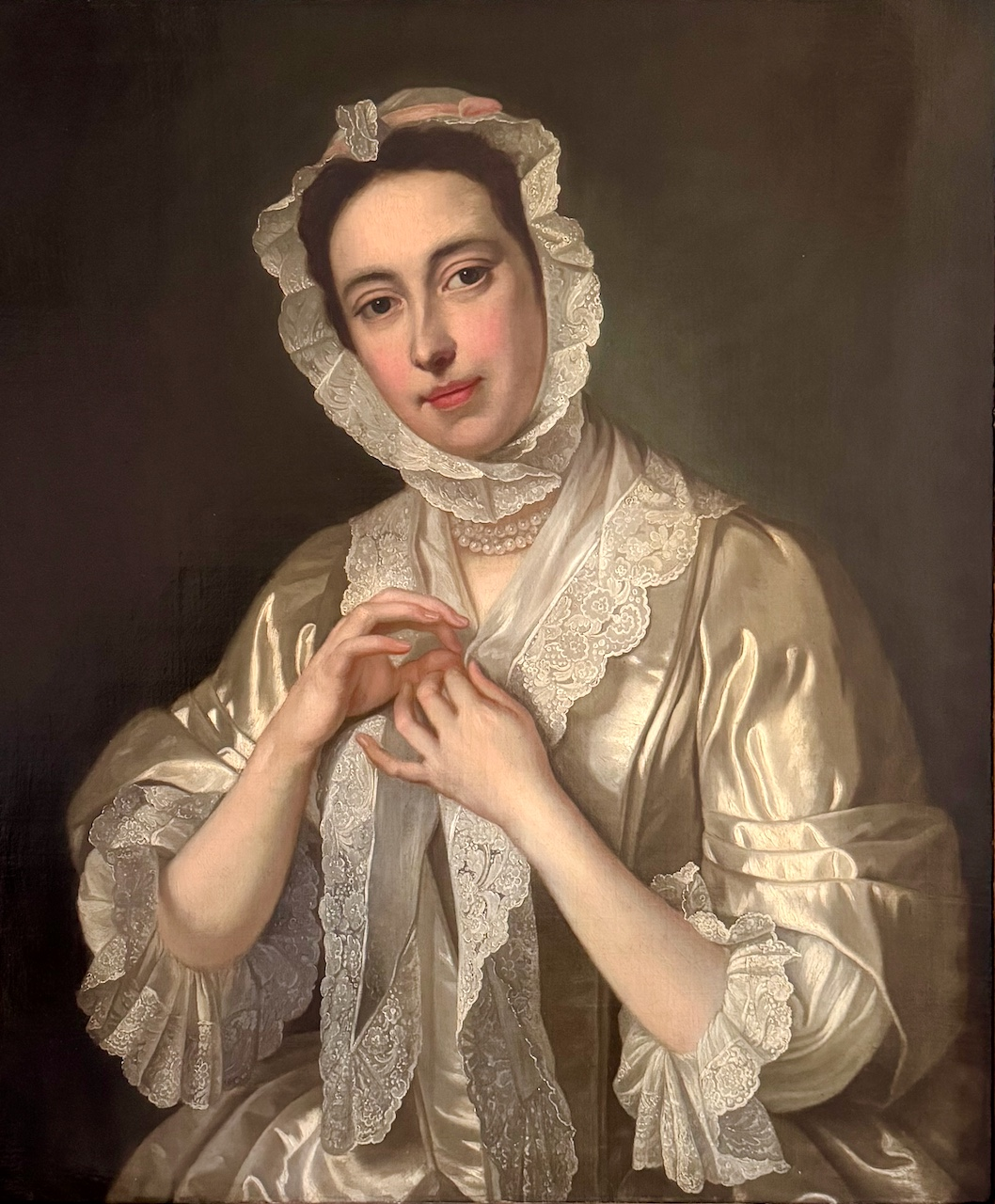
Audrey Viscountess Townshend c.1738 (Private Collection)

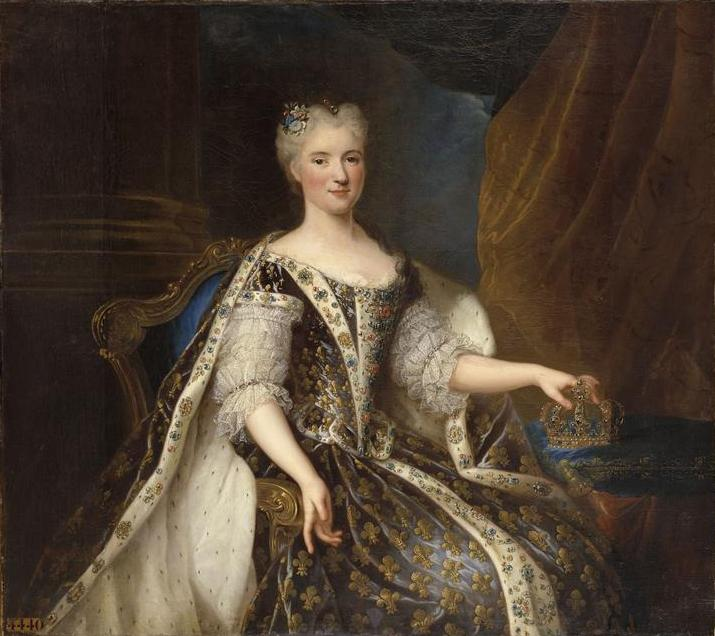
Queen Marie Leszczyńska, 1726 (Palace of Versailles).

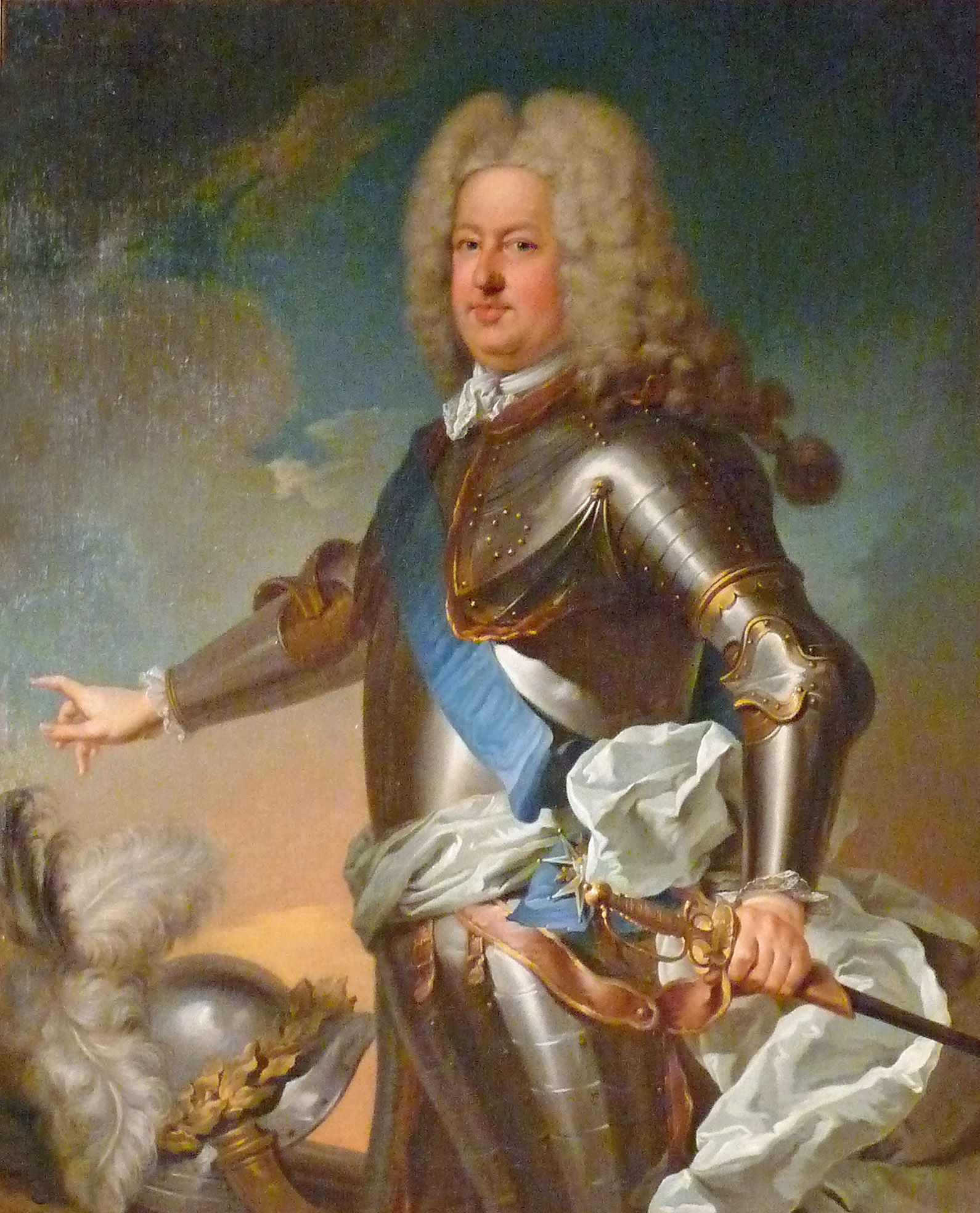
Stanisław Leszczyński, 1727 (Musée Barrois).

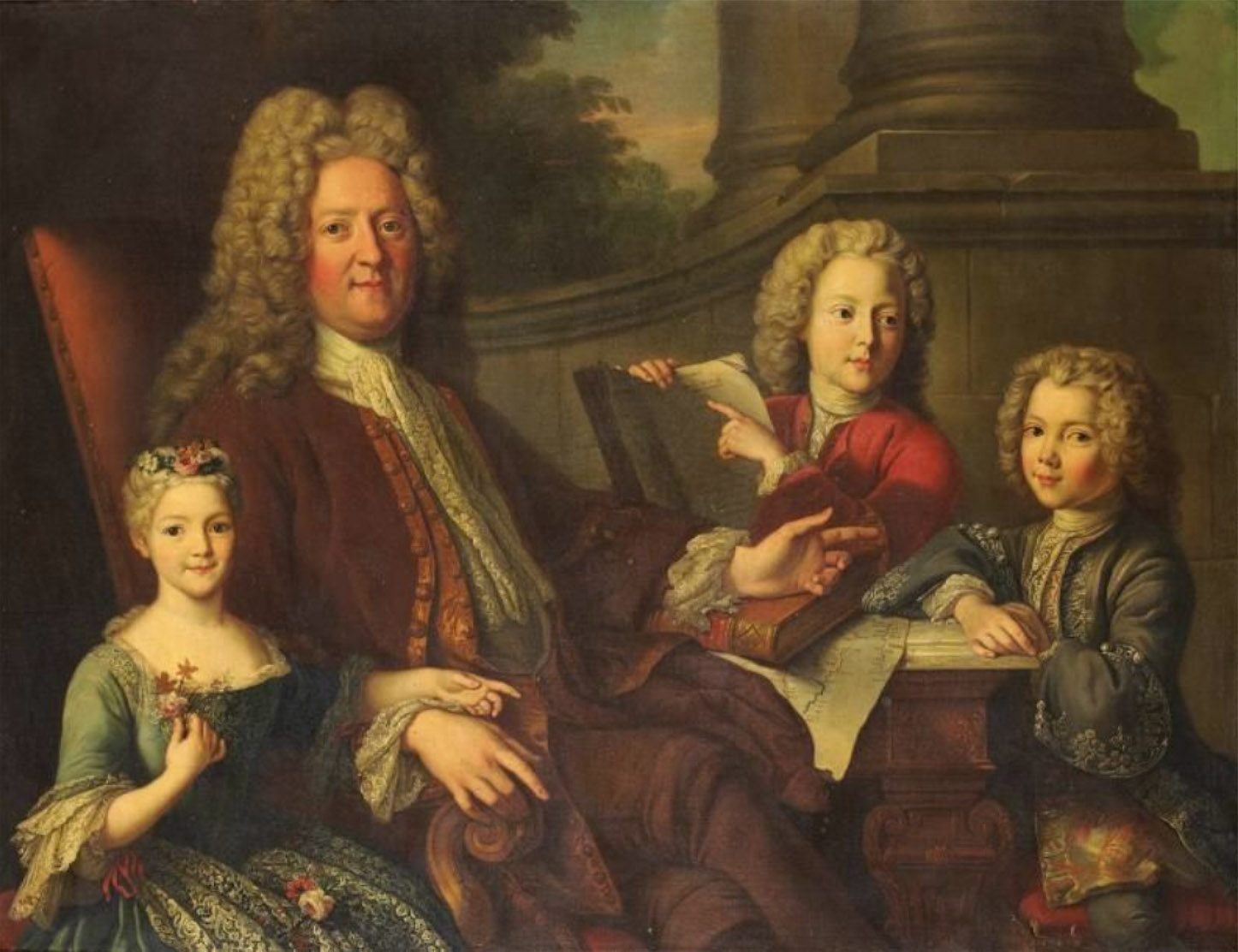
Louis Auguste, Duke of Maine with his two sons and only daughter, 18th century (Unidentified location).

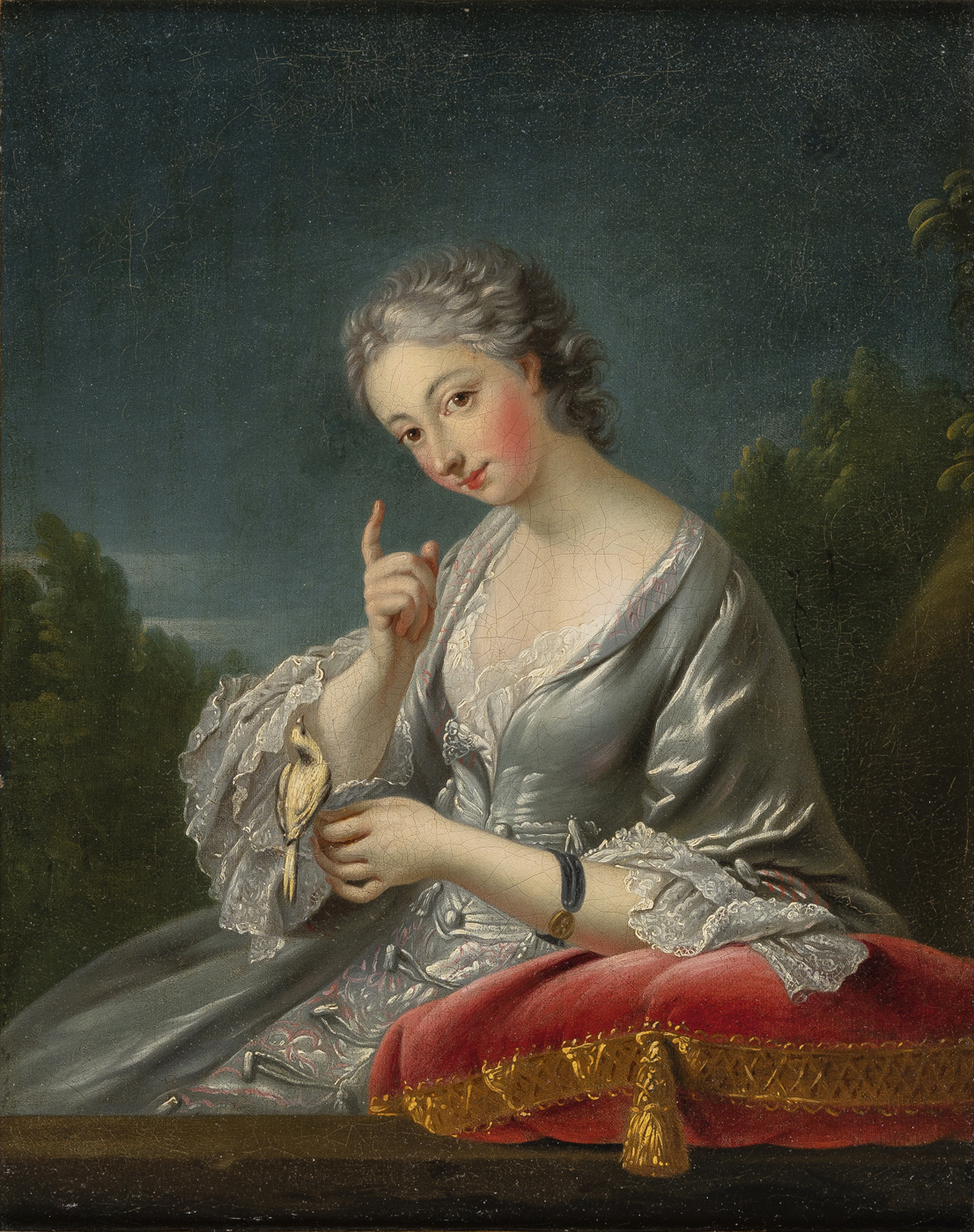
Jeanne Agnès Berthelot de Pléneuf, marquise de Prie, 18th century (Unidentified location).

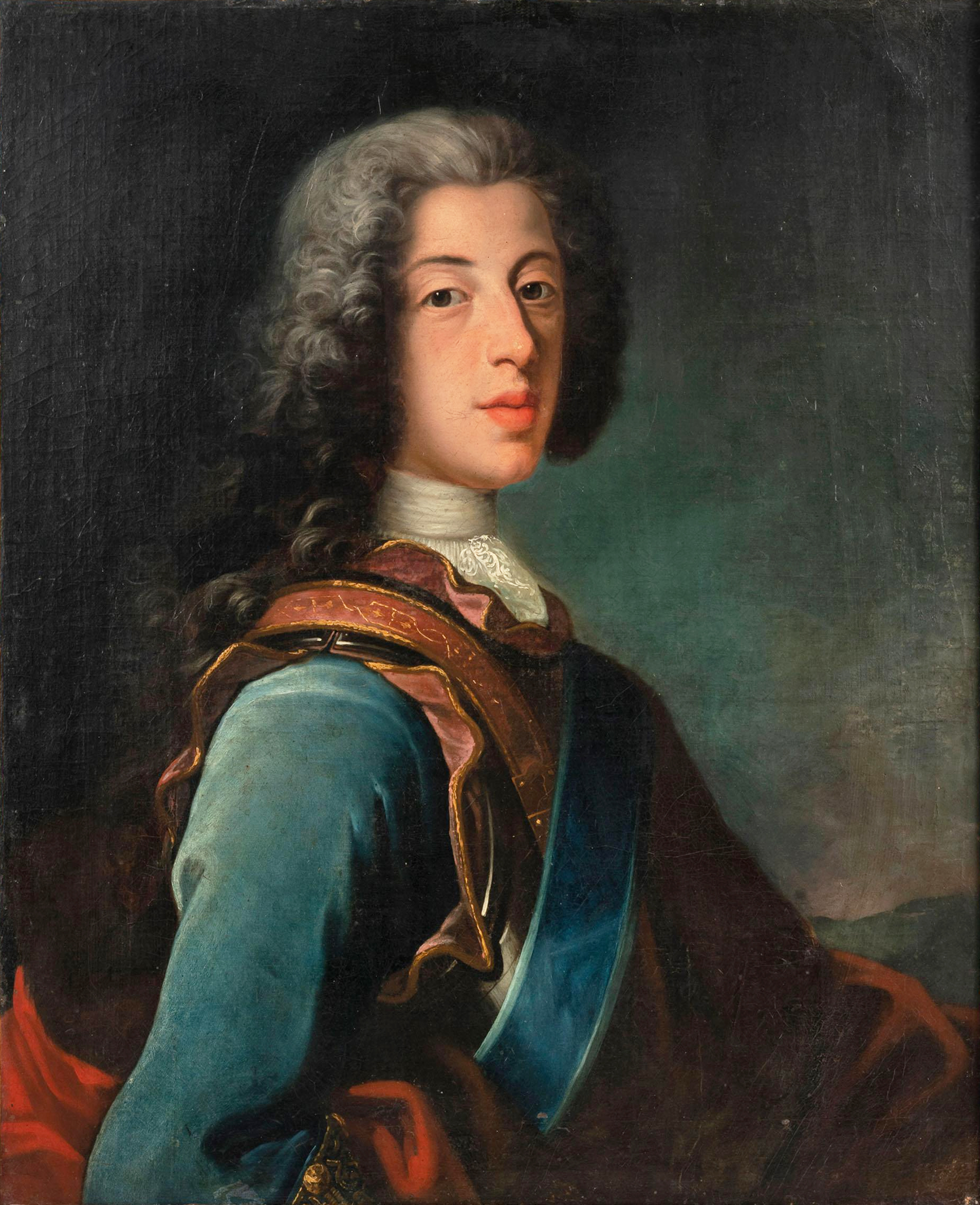
John Theodore of Bavaria, 18th century (Unidentified location).

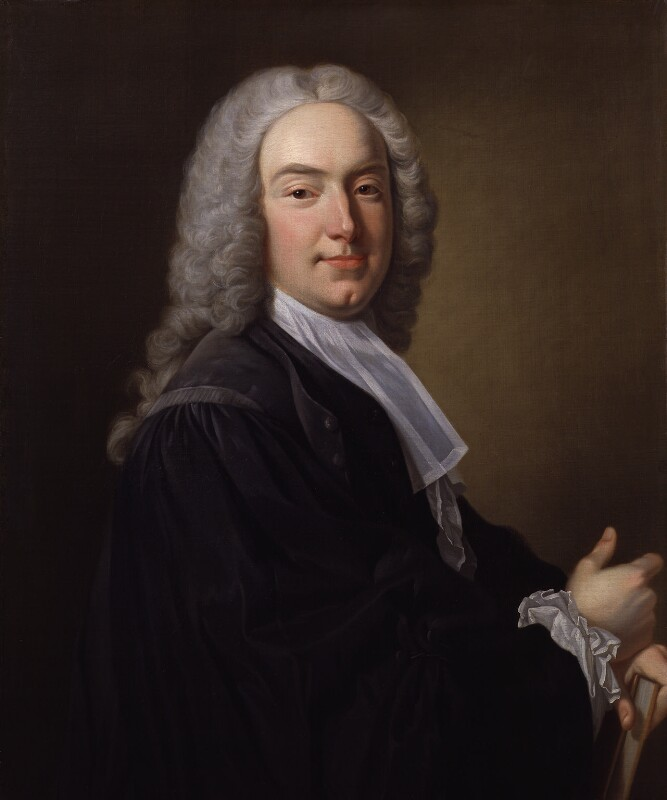
Portrait of William Murray, c. 1737 (National Portrait Gallery, London).

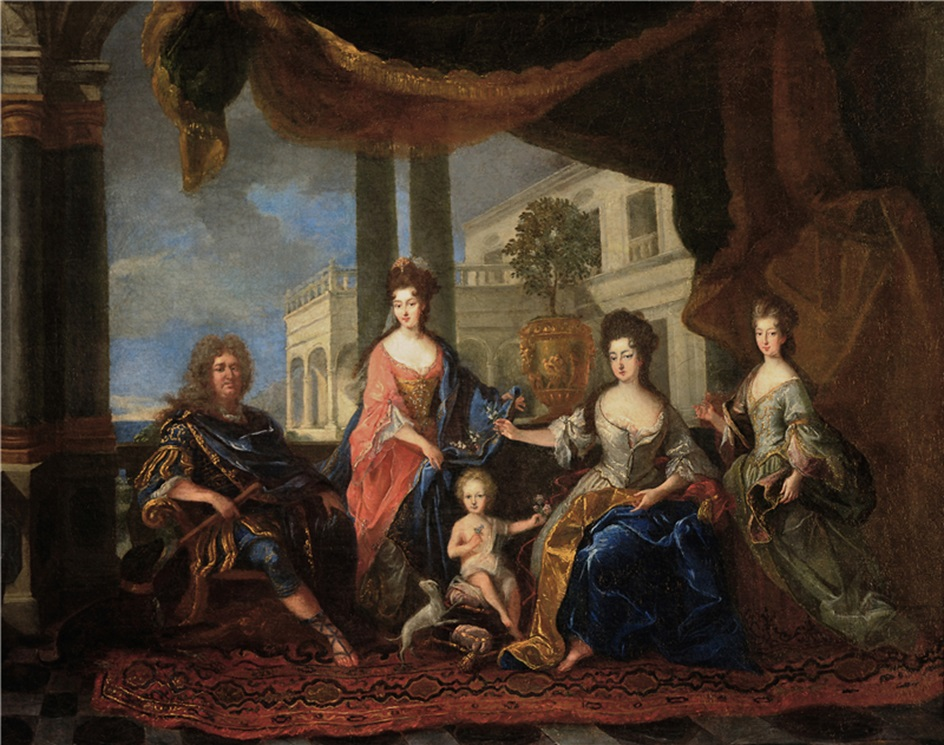
Family of Antoine I, Prince of Monaco, 1712 (Archives of the Prince's Palace of Monaco).

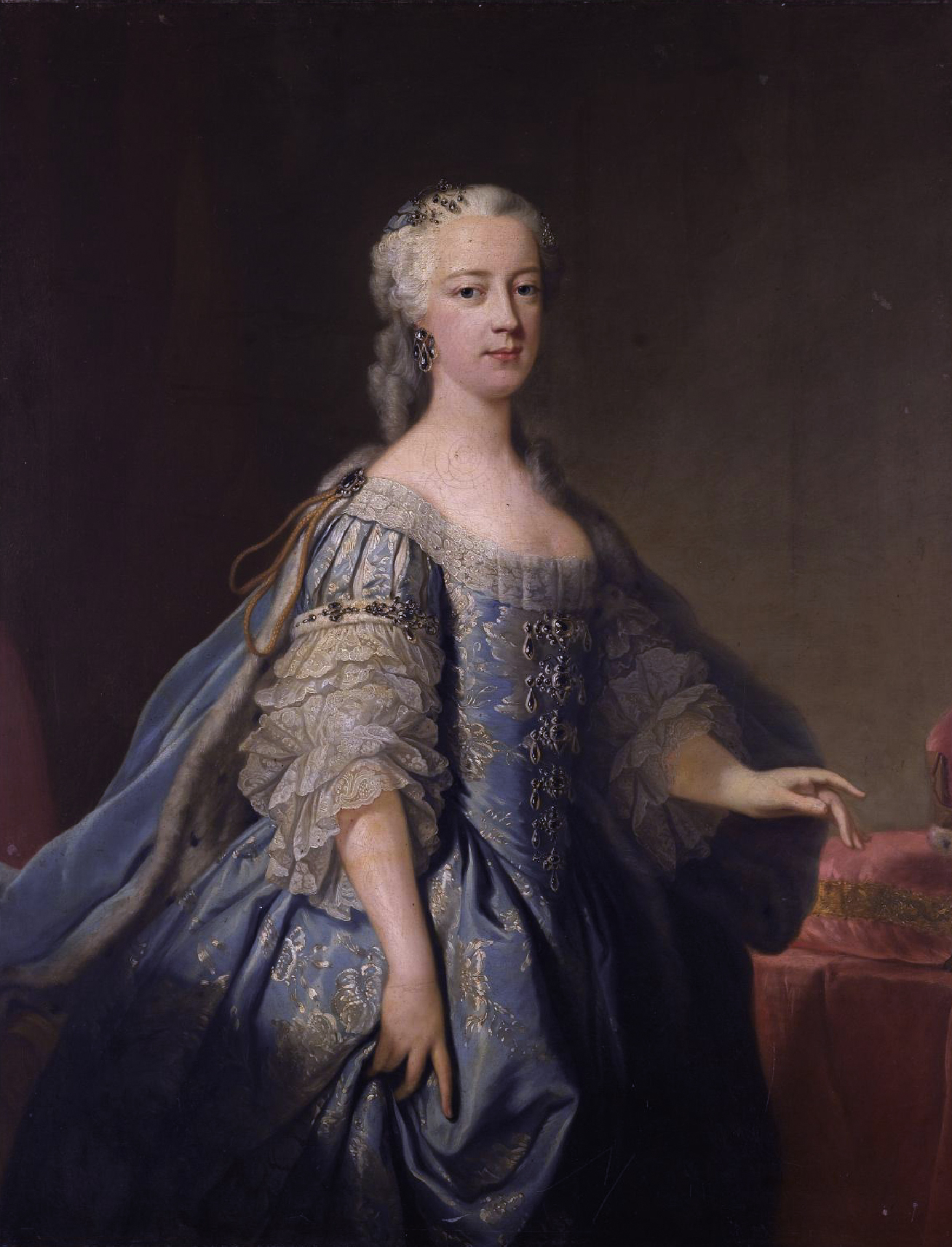
Princess Amelia of Great Britain, c. 1738 (Unidentified location).

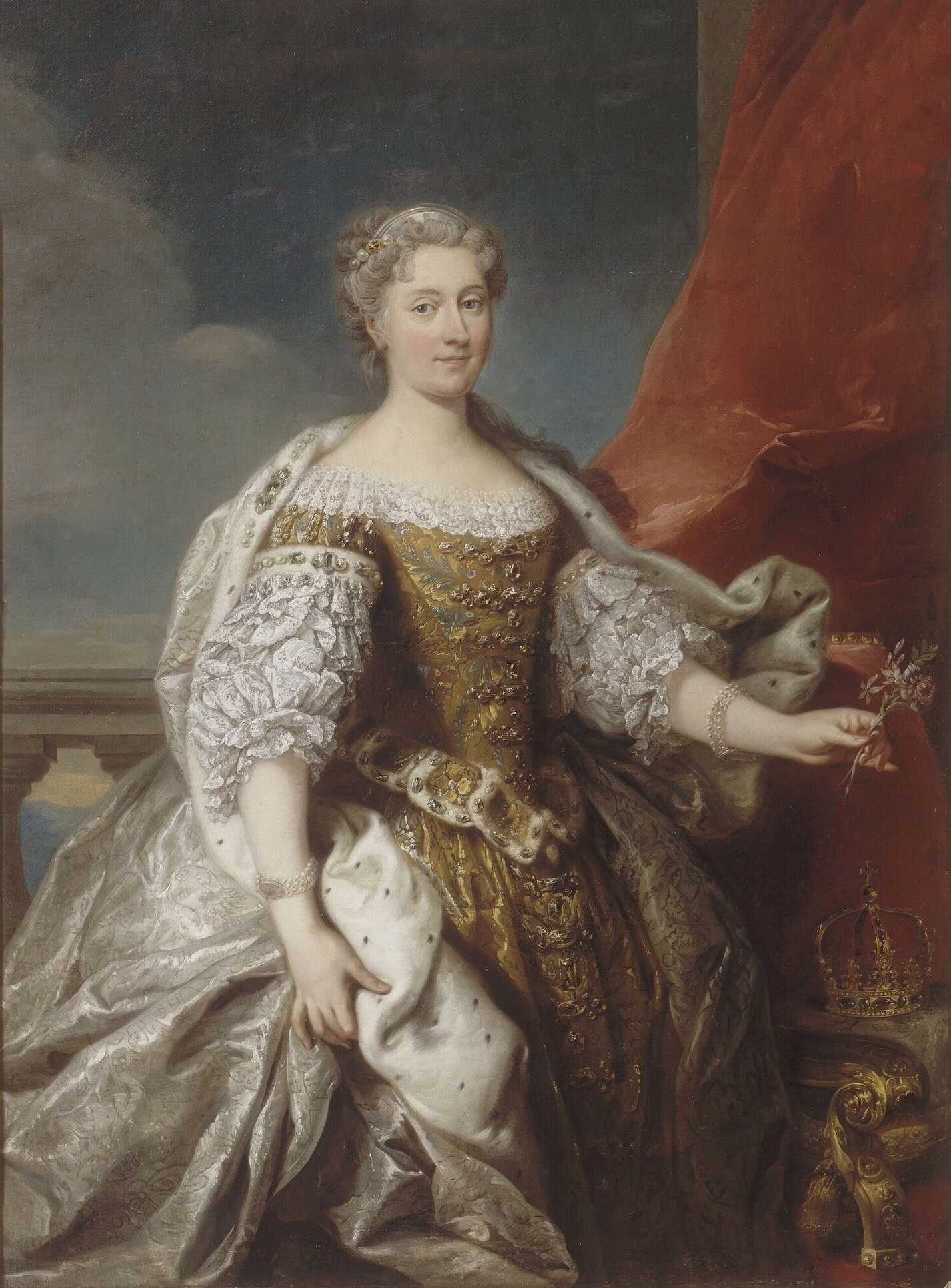
Catherine Opalińska, c. 1725 (Palace of Versailles).

== See also ==
- His younger brother, Charles-André van Loo (1705–1765), was also a painter.
- Two of his sons were notable painters, Louis-Michel van Loo (1707–1771) and Charles-Amédée-Philippe van Loo (1719–1795).
- John Giles Eccardt, one of his apprentices, also became a noted portrait painter in Britain.

== Sources ==
- "Ванло или ван-Ло, художники" . Brockhaus and Efron Encyclopedic Dictionary (in Russian). 1906.
- West, Shearer (2003). "Loo, Jean-Baptiste van". Grove Art Online.
