= Philip of Spain =

Philip of Spain is the name of several Spanish monarchs:

- Philip I of Castile or Philip I of Spain (1478–1506)
- Philip II of Spain (1527–1598), and jure uxoris king of England and Ireland
- Philip III of Spain (1578–1621)
- Philip IV of Spain (1605–1665)
- Philip V of Spain (1683–1746)
- Philip of Spain (1712–1719)
- Philip VI of Spain (born 1968), known as Felipe VI of Spain
