= Infante Philip of Spain =

Infante Philip of Spain could refer to two sons of Spanish kings:

- Infante Philip, Duke of Calabria, the eldest son and once heir-apparent of Charles III of Spain
- Infante Philip of Spain (1712–1719), son of Philip V of Spain
