= Michel Ange Houasse =

French painter

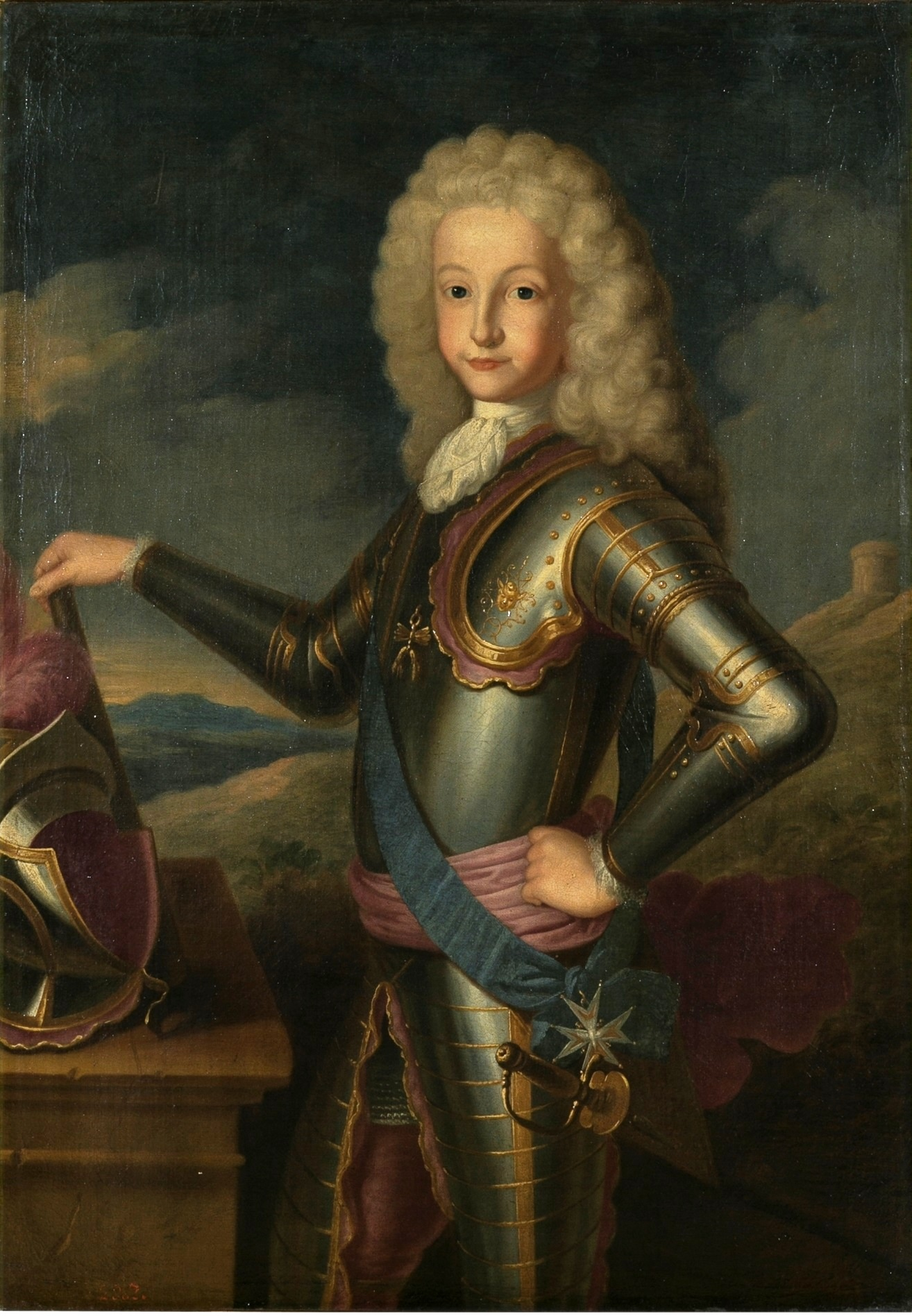
- Portrait of prince Louis by Houasse
- Born: 1680; Paris
- Died: 30 September 1730 (aged 49–50); Arpajon
- Education: Académie royale de peinture et de sculpture
- Occupation: Painter
- Movement: Baroque painting
- Father: René-Antoine Houasse

Michel Ange Houasse (1680–1730) was a French painter, most of whose career was spent at the court of Philip V of Spain, who summoned him to the court in Madrid in 1715 whilst he was still Philip of Anjou. (Michel Ange had already trained in the studio of his father, René-Antoine Houasse.) Michel Ange produced many portraits of the Spanish royal family, including ones of the future king Louis I. He introduced Spain to mythological and rural scenes he had learned from Flemish Baroque art. His taste for pastoral and bucolic genre scenes resulted in paintings such as Blind man's buff (in Spanish, La gallina ciega), clearly influenced by Watteau and itself a clear influence on Goya's oil on linen cartoon of the same name. In his later years he came into friction over works for the royal court with his fellow French artist Jean Ranc.

== Sources ==
- Scholarly articles in English about Michel-Ange Houasse both in web and PDF @ the Spanish Old Masters Gallery
- Biography on artehistoria.com
- Biographies and lives
