= Edict of Potsdam =

1685 proclamation by Frederick William, Elector of Brandenburg

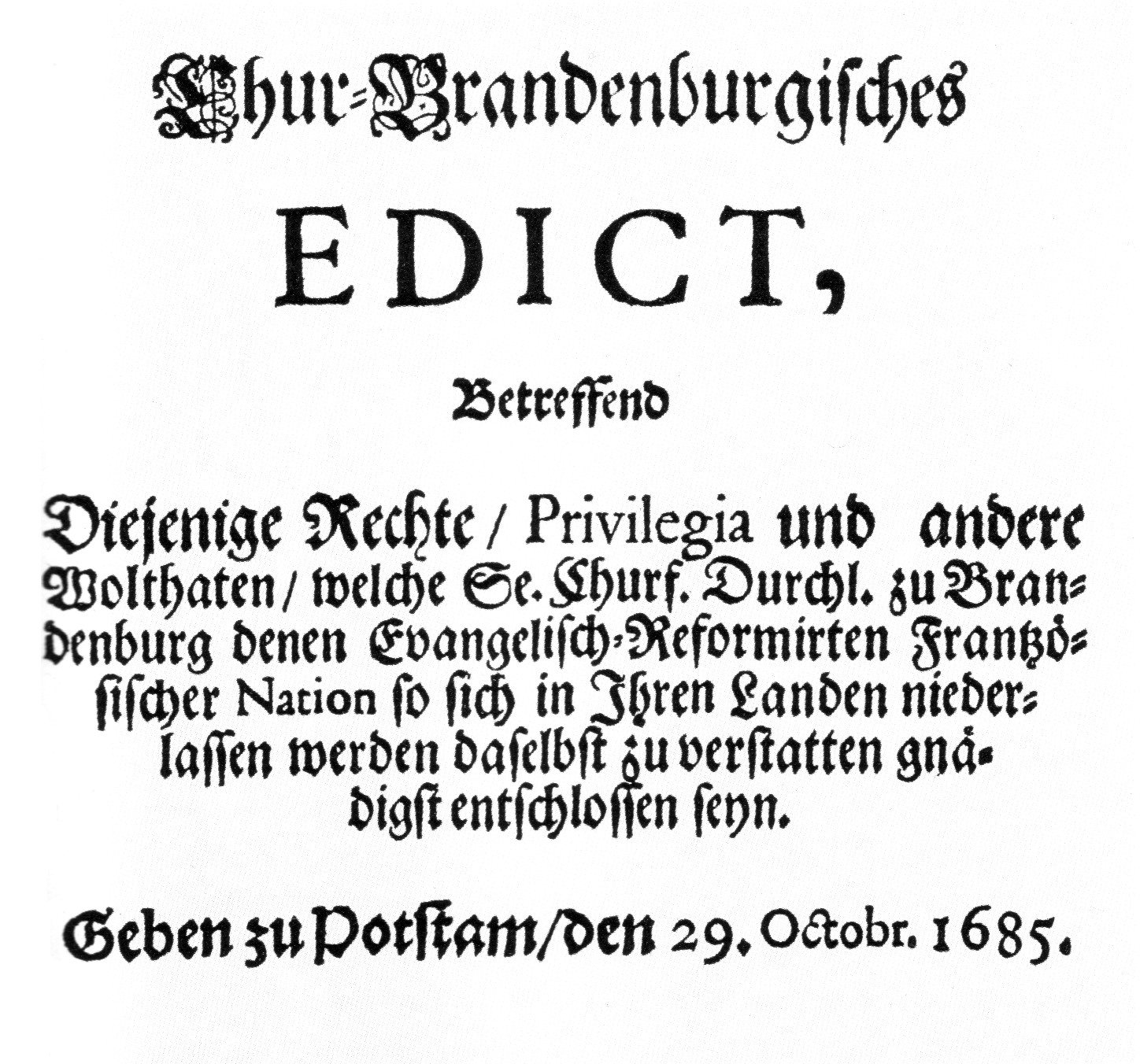
Edict of Potsdam

The Edict of Potsdam (German: Edikt von Potsdam) was a proclamation issued by Frederick William, Elector of Brandenburg and Duke of Prussia, in Potsdam on 29 October 1685, as a response to the revocation of the Edict of Nantes by the Edict of Fontainebleau. It encouraged Protestants to relocate to Brandenburg.

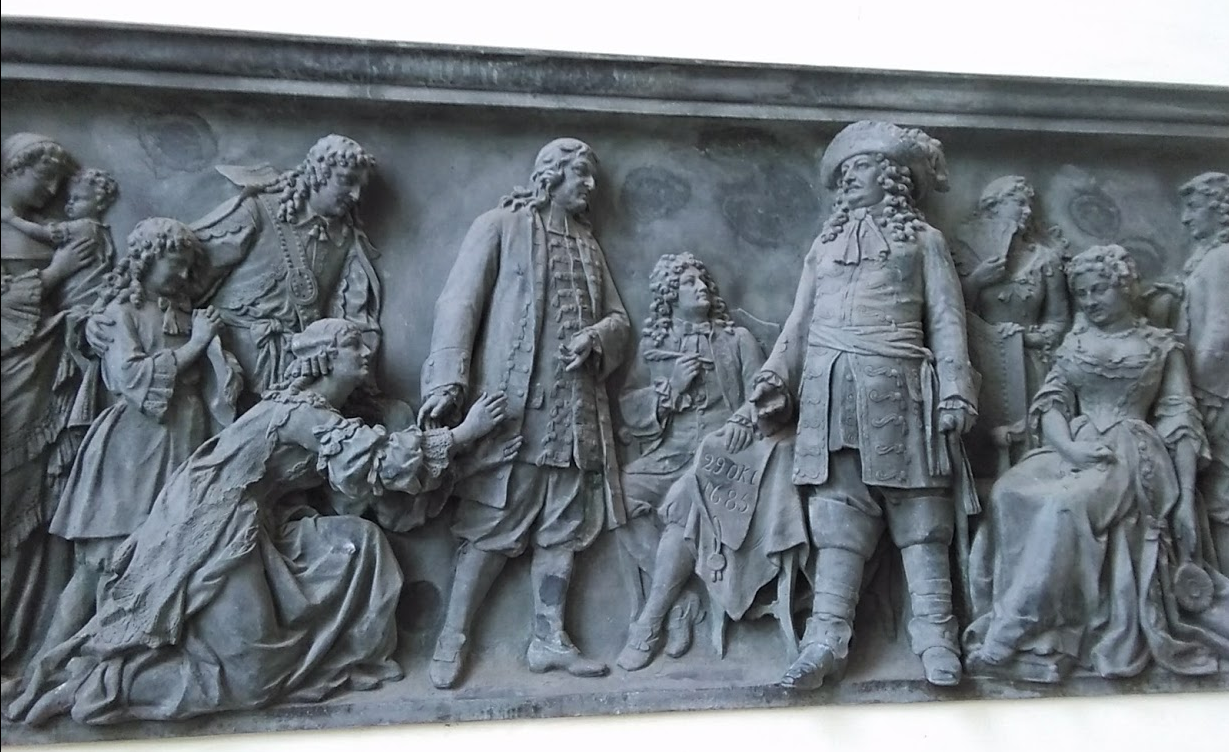
French Huguenots fleeing to Brandenburg

== Background ==
On 22 October 1685, King Louis XIV of France issued the Edict of Fontainebleau, which was part of a program of persecution that closed Huguenot churches and schools. This policy escalated the harassment of religious minorities since the dragonnades were created in 1681 in order to intimidate Huguenots into converting to Catholicism. As a result, a large number of Protestants — estimates range from 210,000 to 900,000 — left France over the next two decades.

Across the Rhine it has been estimated that the Holy Roman Empire had lost a third of its population through slaughter, famine and plague during the Thirty Years' War (1618–1648). The western part of Brandenburg-Prussia fell within the empire: badly depopulated, the territory faced a desperate labour shortage during the second half of the seventeenth century.

== The edict ==
The novelist Theodor Fontane was descended from French religious refugees who had relocated to Brandenburg-Prussia in response to the Edicts of Fontainbleau and Potsdam. Two hundred years later, he wrote a lengthy and resounding
"Prologue to the two hundredth anniversary celebration of the French colony":

A shelter found, freedom of [religious] belief,
And refuge from oppression of the conscience.
A courageous prince, free and devout,
Received us here, as he prince of the country
Received us as his own people. No envy was awakened,
No jealousy, - People opened their doors
And welcomed us as Brothers in Christ......

Ein Obdach fanden, Freistatt für den Glauben,
Und Zuflucht vor Bedrängnis der Gewissen.
Ein hochmuther Fürst, so frei wie fromm,
Empfing uns hier, und wie der Fürst des Landes
Empfing uns auch sein Volk. Kein Neid ward wach,
Nicht Eifersucht, - man öffnete die Thür
Und hieß als Glaubensbrüder uns willkommen......

— Theodor Fontane, 1885, '

Encouraged by the French theologian-philosopher Jakob Abbadie, on 29 October 1685, Frederick William, Elector of Brandenburg issued the Edict of Potsdam.

A large number of religious refugees had arrived by ship at Cadzand and other coastal ports in the Netherlands. The edict, which reflected a hands-on practical approach by the Prussian leadership, provided for Prussian diplomats in Amsterdam to arrange ships to transport these by sea to the Free City of Hamburg where Prussian representatives would be on hand to arrange transport up the Elbe to their chosen destinations in the Brandenburg-Prussia heartland. For people fleeing from eastern and southern France provision was made for a land route via Sedan and the Duchy of Cleves, which had become a territory of Brandenburg-Prussia in 1666, and where the Great Elector (as the Prussian ruler is identified in English language history books) had arranged for them to be settled locally or transported on via the Rhine to new homes further east. In its third section the edict spelled out a succession of suggested places where the migrants might wish to live, and went on to promise "free choice [as to] their place of settlement... wherever they find it most convenient to practice their professions and trades".

The edict expressly ruled out any customs duties or other taxes on assets that the migrants were able to bring along with them. Migrants would be accommodated in abandoned and dilapidated properties which their owners had lacked the means to make habitable. They would receive their properties free of mortgages or other debts or obligations, and they would be provided at no cost to themselves with the necessary timber and other building materials. Any former proprietors would be compensated for the transfer value of properties allocated to the migrants, and the new settlers would enjoy a six-year tax holiday in respect of any property taxes (though they would remain subject to the same taxes on consumption as other citizens).

In some of the many places where tracts of abandoned cultivable land had been identified, the elector's edict provided for the perpetual freehold of these to be allocated to his "French Protestant Comrades in Belief" ("Evangelisch-Reformirten Glaubens-Genossen"), free of mortgages or other encumbrances. Materials would be provided for refugee farmers to bring their land into cultivation and construct homes. A ten-year tax holiday was included in the package. The edict also recorded that in affected localities officials had been mandated to hire town houses where Huguenot refugees might be received and accommodated with their families rent free for up to four years while arrangements for them to create their own farms were put in place, although this generous provision was expressly conditional on beneficiaries subsequently bringing their farms into production.

It was spelled out that as soon as a French Protestant migrant family had settled in a town or village they should enjoy full legal and civic equality with the elector's existing subjects. Significantly, they would not be subjected to any discriminatory so-called "Droit d’Aubaine" or other burden with which foreign immigrants in other kingdoms, states and republics would be encumbered. Migrants were permitted to hold church services in their native French language and to set up their own schools.

The elector moved fast. On 9 November 1685 translations of the Edict were printed in German, French and Dutch. These were quickly distributed to the affected areas in France using secret couriers and local Protestant networks.

== Results ==
It is estimated that approximately 20,000 Huguenot refugees relocated to Brandenburg-Prussia in response to the Edict of Potsdam. The contrast between the generosity of the Prussian ruler's Edict of Potsdam and the vindictiveness of the self-styled "Sun king's" Edict of Fontainebleau was conscious and widely remarked. The embryonic state became a center of European immigration, its religious freedom attracting not only French Protestants but also the persecuted of Russia, the Netherlands, and Bohemia. Thus, the immigrants to the Electorate of Brandenburg stabilized and greatly improved the country's economy following the destructive wars that had swept through Europe in the seventeenth-century.

The Edict of Potsdam was not a product of mere altruism or publicity-seeking on the part of an ambitious German prince. A large immigrant community personally linked to the ruler by their religious beliefs also strengthened the ruler's own position in relation to the landed nobility and the powerful Lutheran interests. In a north German state with only limited access to natural resources, there was also a compelling economic case to be made for returning to productive usage land which had been abandoned since the Thirty Years' War.

A particularly well documented case is that of the farmer Jean Harlan, based in Calais and barely 20 years old when the Edict of Fontainbleau was proclaimed in 1685. With others, he escaped in a boat along the English Channel, traveling as far as Cadzand on the Dutch coast. In one of the several "transit" points set up by Prussian officials in the Netherlands, he was provided with financial support and documentation, before moving on to Uckermark, close to the Oder River. Here he met and in February 1689 married Marie Le Jeune, another Huguenot refugee who had managed to escape from France with her three children. In Uckermark they were allocated an empty farmstead, together with building material, seed corn, two horses, a cow, and 50 Thalers. Uckermark was a particular focus of Huguenot resettlement. The farmstead was one of 2,900 available for settlement in the area, where the package including "two horses, a cow, and 50 Thalers" was apparently the standard one. The Harlans were able to benefit from the grants and tax privileges provided by the Edict of Potsdam, and Jean Harlan later went on to build a business as a tobacco merchant. His son, Jakob Harlan, subsequently founded a commercial dynasty of upwardly mobile business people.

== See also ==
- Französischer Dom: the French Cathedral of Berlin, established in 1705 for Huguenot immigrants. Its design is based on a Huguenot temple outside Paris, demolished in 1685.
