= Maria Luisa Gabriella of Savoy =

Queen of Spain from 1701 to 1714

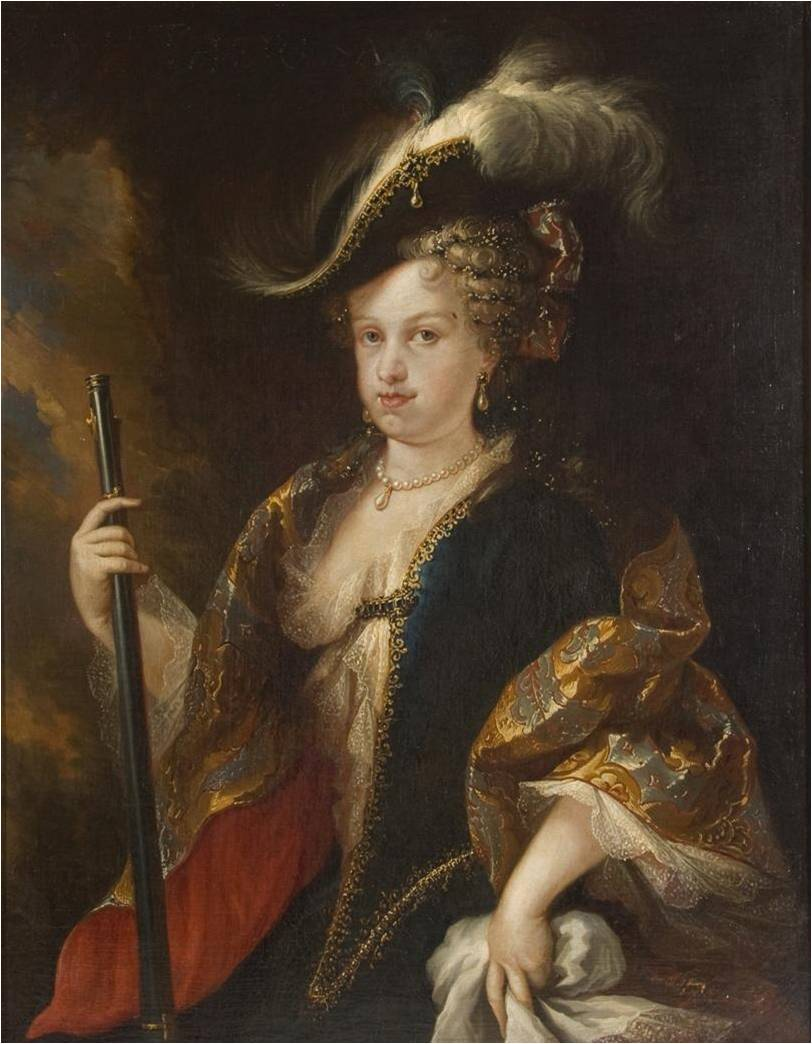
- Portrait by Miguel Jacinto Melendez, c. 1712

Queen consort of Spain
- Tenure: 2 November 1701 – 14 February 1714
- Born: 17 September 1688; Royal Palace of Turin, Savoy
- Died: 14 February 1714 (aged 25); Royal Alcázar of Madrid, Spain
- Burial: El Escorial
- Spouse: Philip V of Spain (m. 1701)
- Issue Detail: Louis I; Infante Philip; Infante Philip Peter; Ferdinand VI
Names
- María Luisa Gabriela de Saboya y Orleans
- House: Savoy
- Father: Victor Amadeus II, Duke of Savoy
- Mother: Anne Marie d'Orléans

Princess Maria Luisa Gabriella of Savoy (17 September 1688 – 14 February 1714), nicknamed La Savoyana, was Queen of Spain by marriage to King Philip V. She acted as regent during her husband's absence from 1702 until 1703 and had great influence as a political adviser during the War of the Spanish Succession, during which she was often regent while Philip fought to protect his legitimacy and his place on the throne.

At the end of the War of the Spanish Succession, Philip V was recognised as King of Spain, establishing the Spanish branch of the House of Bourbon, which still rules over Spain to this day. Two of her four sons, Louis I and Ferdinand VI, took their turns as King of Spain. Maria Luisa died from tuberculosis when she was 25.

== Early life ==
=== Childhood ===
María Luisa Gabriella was born on 17 September 1688, at the Royal Palace of Turin, Savoy. She was the third daughter and second surviving child of Victor Amadeus II, Duke of Savoy and Anne Marie of Orléans, the youngest daughter of Philippe I, Duke of Orléans and Princess Henrietta of England.

In her youth, Maria Luisa Gabriella was described as "intelligent, playful, and fun-loving" and had received an excellent education. She remained close to her older sister Maria Adelaide, who later married Louis, Duke of Burgundy, the eldest grandson of Louis XIV.

=== Engagement ===
French Prince Philippe, Duke of Anjou had ascended to the Spanish crown upon the death of his great-uncle, the childless Charles II of Spain. In order to enforce his shaky authority over Spain due to his French birth, Philip V decided to maintain ties with the Duke of Savoy by marrying his daughter Maria Luisa Gabriella, his second cousin through King Louis XIII. In mid-1701, Philip V asked for her hand with the permission of his grandfather, King Louis XIV. They were wed by proxy on 12 September 1701, five days before Maria Luisa Gabriella's thirteenth birthday. She arrived to Nice on 18 September and was greeted by Pope Clement XI, who gave her the Golden Rose on 20 September as a ritualistic gift. Within a week, she sailed from Nice for Antibes and was taken to Barcelona.

== Queen of Spain ==
Queen Maria Luisa's coat of arms.

The official wedding took place on 2 November 1701. Philip V was seventeen and Maria Luisa was thirteen. He was deeply in love with his wife from the start: as would be the case of his next consort, he was sexually dependent on her because his religious scruples prevented him from exercising any sexual life outside of marriage.

Unlike what was normal for a Spanish monarch, he usually slept in her bed the entire night, and insisted upon his conjugal rights. Already shortly after their marriage, the French ambassador, the Duke of Gramont reported to Louis XIV that Philip would be completely governed by his spouse as long as he had one, a report that led Louis XIV to warn his grandson not to allow his Queen to dominate him.

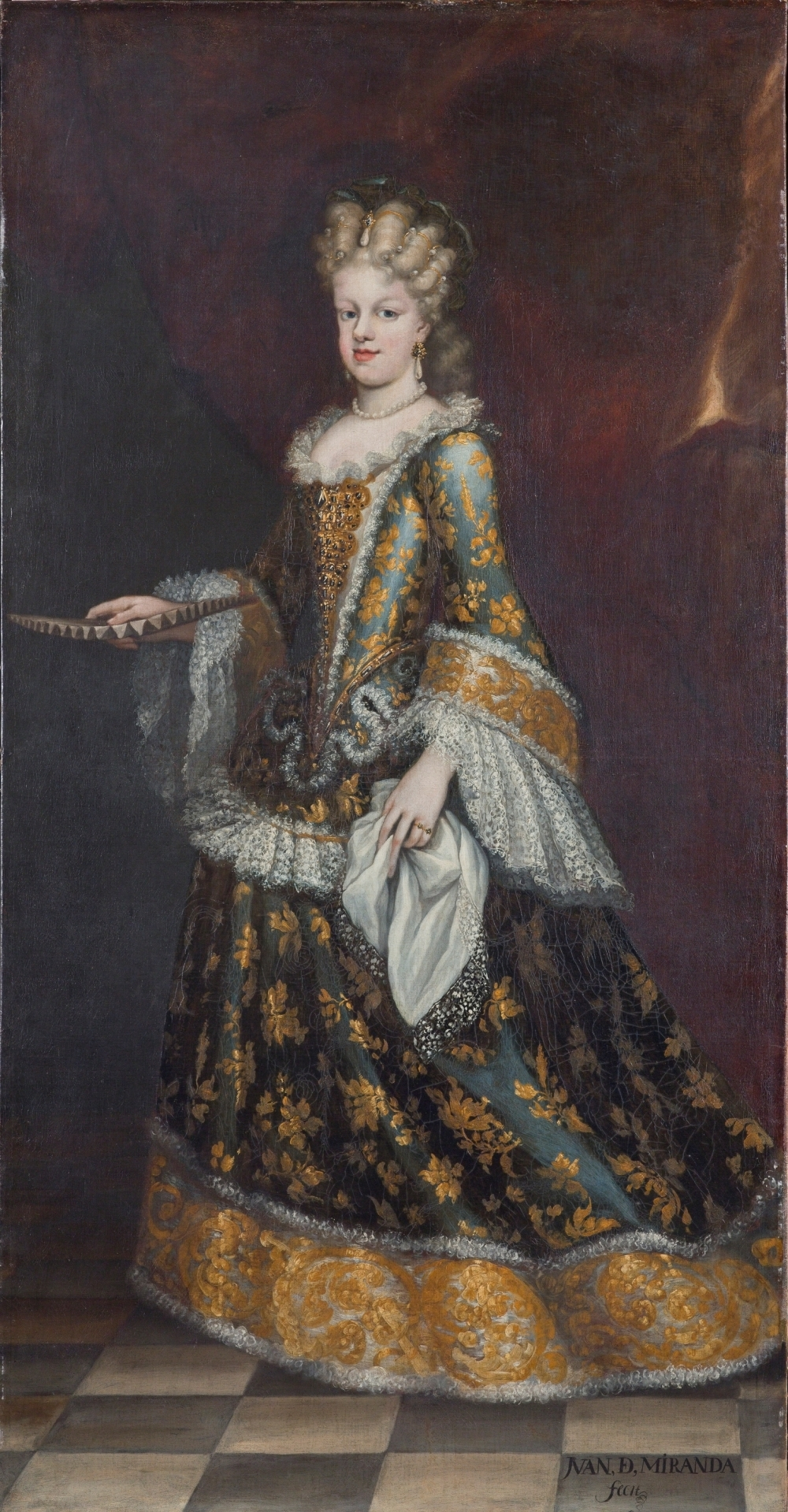
Portrait by Juan Garcia de Miranda

In general, the young Queen's influence was beneficial: Maria Luisa Gabriella is described as remarkably mature for her age, politically savvy, articulate and hardworking. She was praised throughout Spain for her regency and had been credited with giving the normally passive Philip V the energy he needed to participate in warfare.

=== Regency and the war ===
In 1702, Philip V was obliged to leave Spain to fight in Naples as part of the ongoing War of the Spanish Succession. During her husband's absence, 14-year-old Maria Luisa Gabriella effectively acted as regent from Madrid, insisting upon all complaints being investigated, ordering that the reports were directly sent to her, and working for hours with ministers. She gave audiences to ambassadors and tried to prevent Savoy from joining the enemy, though this goal soon failed. However, she successfully encouraged the reorganization of the Junta and considerable monetary donations from several nobles and cities towards the war effort. In 1715, Philip V was eventually recognised as King of Spain and retained most of its colonial possessions, but ceded territories in Italy and renounced the French throne for himself and his descendants.

=== Court Intrigue ===
French Courtier Marie Anne de La Trémoille, Princesse des Ursins, was a member of the Spanish Queen's household. She would maintain great influence over Maria Luisa Gabriella as her Camarera mayor de Palacio, the chief lady-in-waiting of the Queen's household. Trémoille maintained strong dominance in Spain by using all the rights of proximity to the Queen Regent that her position entitled her to: she was almost constantly in Maria Luisa Gabriella's presence, accompanied her wherever she went as soon as she left her private rooms, followed her to the council meetings where she listened sitting by the side sewing, followed her back to her rooms where she was present at the most intimate personal tasks, dressing and undressing her, and controlling whoever wished to come into her presence. As Philip V actually shared a bedroom with Maria Luisa Gabriella, the Princess came to obtain enormous influence over the King.

In 1704, Trémoille was exiled at the order of King Louis XIV, devastating the rulers. However, in 1705, the Princess returned to Madrid, much to the Queen's joy.

== Death ==
Towards the end of her life, Maria Luisa Gabriella became ill with tuberculosis. She died in the Royal Alcázar of Madrid, on 14 February 1714 at the age of 25. The Queen was buried at San Lorenzo de El Escorial. On 16 September 1714, just months after her death, her widower remarried by proxy, to Elisabeth Farnese, the heiress of the Duke of Parma. Her niece, Princess Maria Luisa was named after her.

== Issue ==
1. Louis (25 August 1707 - 31 August 1724): Future King Louis I of Spain. Married Louise Élisabeth d'Orléans
2. Philip (2 July 1709 - 18 July 1709): Died in infancy.
3. Philip (7 June 1712 - 29 December 1719): Died in childhood.
4. Ferdinand VI of Spain (23 September 1713 - 10 August 1759): Married Infanta Maria Barbara of Portugal

As all of her sons were to die without issue, there are no descendants of Maria Luisa Gabriella of Savoy.

== Ancestry ==
Ancestors of Maria Luisa Gabriella of Savoy

8. Victor Amadeus I, Duke of Savoy
4. Charles Emmanuel II, Duke of Savoy
9. Christine of France
2. Victor Amadeus II of Sardinia
10. Charles Amadeus, Duke of Nemours
5. Marie Jeanne Baptiste of Savoy
11. Élisabeth de Bourbon
1. Maria Luisa Gabriella of Savoy
12. Louis XIII of France
6. Philippe I, Duke of Orléans
13. Anne of Austria
3. Anne Marie d'Orléans
14. Charles I of England
7. Henrietta of England
15. Henrietta Maria of France

Maria Luisa Gabriella of Savoy House of Savoy Born: 17 November 1688 Died: 14 February 1714
Spanish royalty
Vacant Title last held by Mariana of Neuburg	Queen consort of Spain; 2 November 1701 – 14 February 1714	Vacant Title next held by Elisabeth Farnese
Vacant Title last held by Mariana of Neuburg	Queen consort of Naples and Sardinia; 1700-1713	Succeeded by Elisabeth Christine of Brunswick-Wolfenbüttel
Vacant Title last held by Mariana of Neuburg	Queen consort of Sicily; 1700–1713	Succeeded by Anne Marie d'Orléans
