= René-Antoine Houasse =

French painter

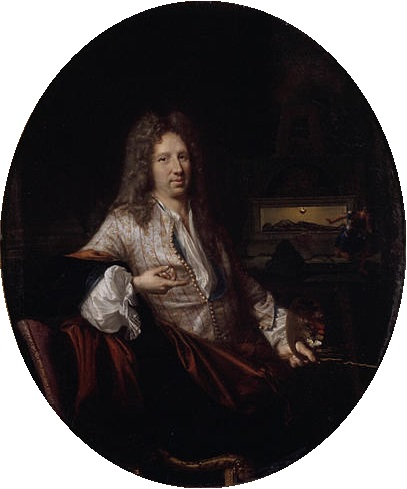
- Portrait of René-Antoine Houasse by François Jouvenet
- Born: 1645; Paris
- Died: 27 March 1710 (aged 64–65)
- Occupation: Painter
- Children: Michel Ange Houasse
- Relatives: Nicolas Houasse (brother)

René-Antoine Houasse (c. 1645–1710) was a decorative French painter.

He was a pupil of Charles Le Brun, under whose direction he worked at the Manufacture des Gobelins, and with whom he worked on the decoration of the Château de Versailles. He was the director of the French Academy in Rome from 1699 to 1704.

He painted an entire series of paintings depicting various myths involving the Graeco-Roman goddess Athena/Minerva.

René-Antoine Houasse was married on 5 February 1673 to Marie Le Blé, cousin of Charles Le Brun, with whom he had three children:

- Agnès-Suzanne Houasse (1674-1719), married on 18 September 1690 with Nicolas Coustou (1658-1733);
- Michel-Ange Houasse (1680-1730), a painter of genre scenes.
- Marie-Charlotte Houasse, possibly born around 1687 as she was described as being only about 32 years old at the death of her husband, the sculptor Pierre Le Gros the Younger. The couple had married on 20 October 1704 in Rome where they lived. The widowed Marie-Charlotte returned to Paris with her three children in 1723.

He died at the hotel of Gramont in Paris on 27 May 1710.

== Major paintings ==
- Allegory of the Royal Magnificence (1678)
- Ceiling paintings in the salon de l’Abondance, Versailles
- Salon de Venus, Versailles
- Terror, Fear and Fright, Salon de Mars, Versailles
- Morpheus & Iris, (1688), Trianon
- Cyane turned into a fountain 1688, Trianon
- Minerva teaching the Rhodians sculpture, 1688, Versailles
