= Louis I of Spain =

King of Spain in 1724

Louis I
- Prince of Asturias
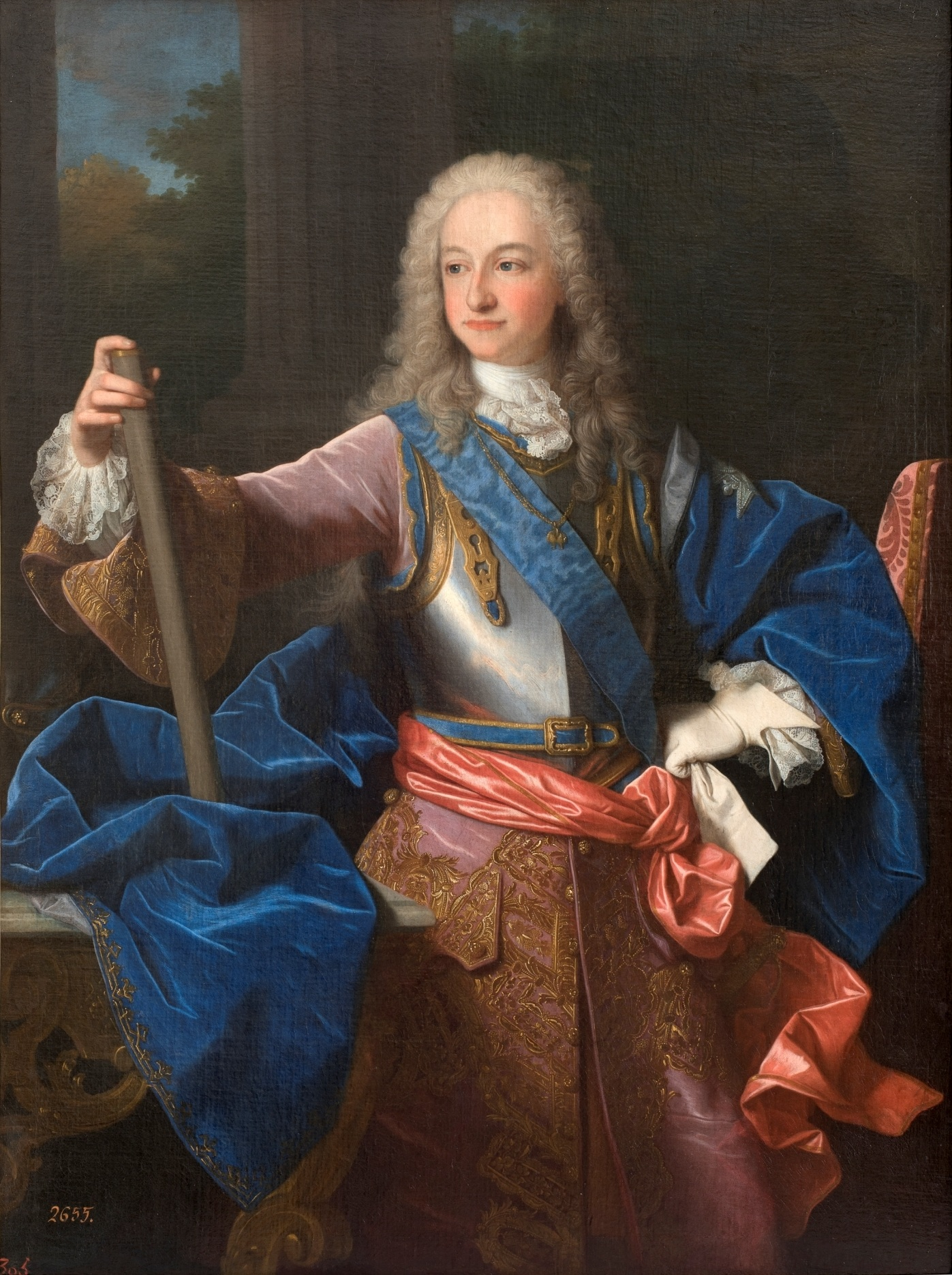
- Portrait by Jean Ranc, c. 1723

King of Spain
- Reign: 15 January 1724 – 31 August 1724
- Predecessor: Philip V
- Successor: Philip V
- Chief Ministers: See list: The Marquess of the Peace
- Born: 25 August 1707; Buen Retiro, Madrid, Castile
- Died: 31 August 1724 (aged 17); Buen Retiro, Madrid, Spain
- Burial: El Escorial
- Spouse: Louise Élisabeth d'Orléans (m. 1722)
Names
- Spanish: Luis Felipe Fernando José de Borbón y Saboya
- House: Bourbon
- Father: Philip V of Spain
- Mother: Maria Luisa Gabriella of Savoy
- Religion: Catholic Church

Louis I (Luis Felipe Fernando; Spanish: Luis I; 25 August 1707 – 31 August 1724) was King of Spain from 15 January 1724 until his death in August the same year. His reign is one of the shortest in history, lasting for just over seven months.

== Infante of Spain (1707–1709) ==
Louis was born at Palacio del Buen Retiro, in Madrid as the eldest son of the reigning King Philip V of Spain and his wife Maria Luisa Gabriella of Savoy. He was named after his great-grandfather Louis XIV of France.

== Prince of Asturias (1709–1721) ==
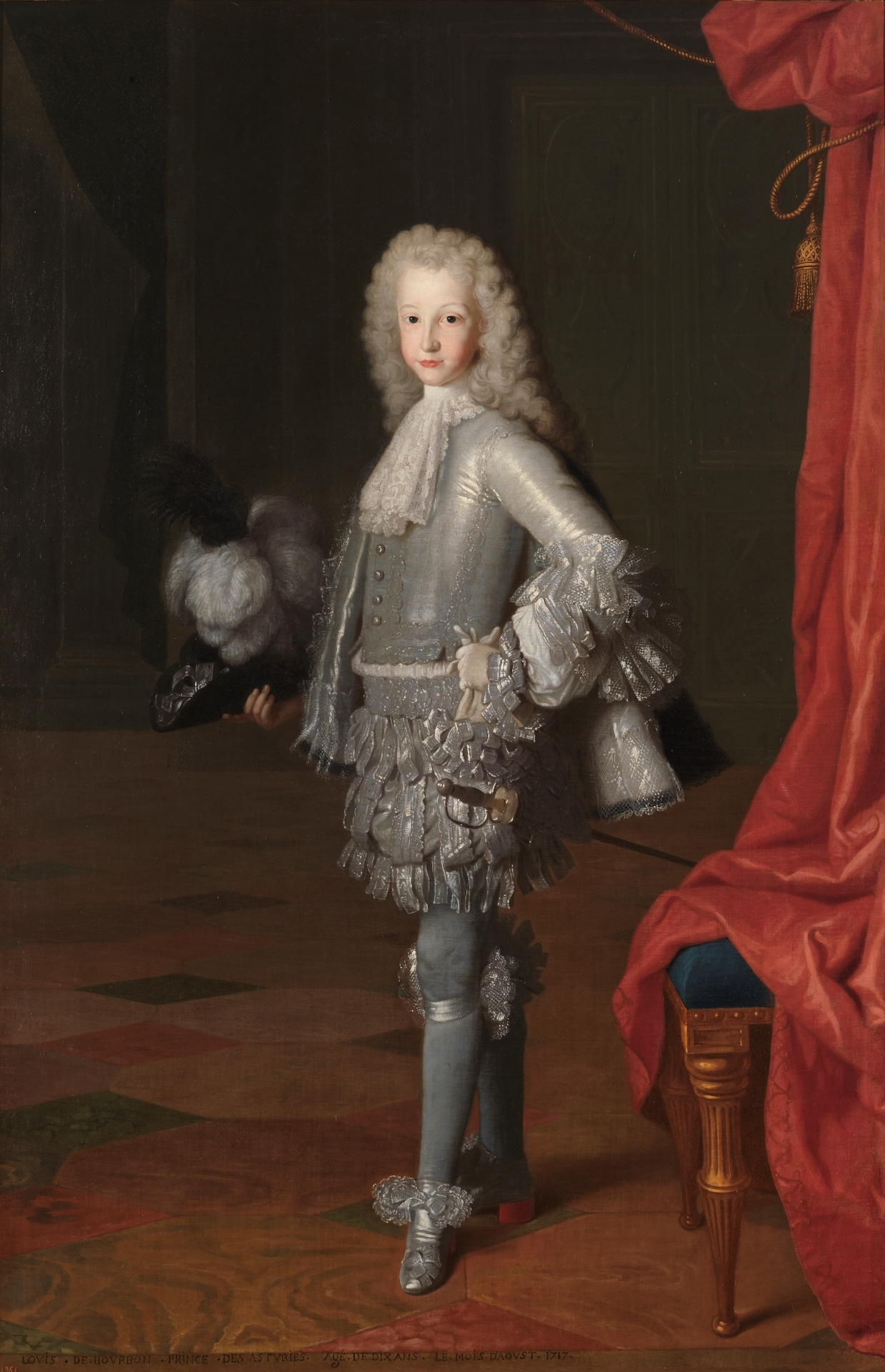
Infante Louis at the age of 10 (1717)

At birth he was the heir apparent but was not given the traditional title of "Prince of Asturias" until April 1709. In 1714, when Louis was seven, his mother died, leaving him and his brothers, Infante Philip and Infante Ferdinand. On 24 December 1714, Louis' father remarried to Elisabeth Farnese, the young heiress to the Duchy of Parma and Piacenza.

== Marriage (1722) ==
As heir not only to the vast Spanish Empire, but also to a new dynasty, it was decided that Louis would take a wife as soon as possible. On 20 January 1722, at Lerma, he met and married his second cousin Louise Élisabeth d'Orléans, a daughter of Philippe II, Duke of Orléans, cousin of Louis' father and then the Regent of France, who was two years his junior. He was fourteen and she was twelve. The dowry of this marriage was an enormous 4 million livres.

== King of Spain (1724) ==
Louis reigned for a short period between the time his father Philip V abdicated in his favour (14 January 1724) and his death from smallpox, just over seven months. King Philip sent him a letter informing him of his decision. He called his son a great king. Louis sent his father a humble reply, thanking him. Louis signed his letter as Prince of Asturias. His marital problems dominated during his reign. His father kept tabs on him from San Ildefonso. To counter his father's influence, he surrounded himself with officials who had not served under Philip. His plans were to focus more on the American colonies rather than the lost Italian territories. On his death, his father returned to the throne, and reigned 22 more years until his own death in 1746. Louis was buried in the Cripta Real del Monasterio de El Escorial part of the El Escorial complex.

His ascension to the throne also produced royal Coronation and Acclamation celebrations throughout the Spanish Empire in 1723. In the Viceroyalty of Peru, the indigenous nobility (composed of curacas, caciques and descendants from the royal panacas) used to participate in symbolic preventive measures at the oaths of kings, receptions of viceroys and celebrations for births or weddings of the royal family (wearing the mascapaicha, the uncu and carrying land parcels). During the oath of allegiance to Louis I in Peru, representatives of the Council of 24 Inca noble electors of Cusco recited a short poem ending with the exclamation "Long live the great Inca, Don Louis I!" This legitimized the colonial pact based on the Translatio imperii, in which the Kings of Spain were also considered Kings of Peru as Catholic Incas who deemed themselves the legitimate heirs of Tahuantinsuyo (as a consequence of their title of King of the West Indies), not an imposed or usurping foreign monarchy. Thus, the colonial corporations of Peruvian society (their intermediary bodies) reaffirmed their loyalty to the Crown, securing their own terms in the pact of vassalage. They symbolically forced Spain to recognize the local institutions (protected by the Inca nobility and the Real Audiencia) and to respect their fueros and privileges (protected by Indian Law and the Laws of the Indies) as heirs of a previous Indian political society.

== Appearance and personality ==
Louis was tall and thin, with blond hair. He was considered unattractive and the similarity between him and his maternal grandfather, Victor Amadeus II of Sardinia, was notable. Apart from this, Louis had weak arms, which emphasized his delicacy.

Not much is known about Louis' personality. According to Vicente Bacallar, Marquis de San Felipe, he was "extremely liberal, magnanimous and into making people to feel comfortable next to him". However, neither his liberty as king nor gentilism eclipsed his strong religiosity. Other contemporaries allegedly pointed out that Louis had inherited his father's intelligence and charm and his mother's morality and submission.

== Sexuality ==
Apart from these attributes, many have argued that Louis also inherited his father's sexual appeal. He was reputedly bisexual, being initiated into such a practice by a servant, originally from Versailles. Historians believe that Lacotte, who was Louis' servant and who had a reputation of being a pedophile, was sent into the Spanish royal court to seduce the prince, whose impotence was known. W. Clarke writes: "the Spanish heir was as into boys as girls during the parties that he had, playing erotic games with both sexes"; a line about Louis' sexual life was sung across streets of Madrid: "Fiery as his mother, lascivious as his father, flaming as his stepmother and onanist as a pedophile".

== Ancestry ==
Ancestors of Louis I of Spain

8. Louis XIV of France
4. Louis, Dauphin of France
9. Maria Theresa of Austria
2. Philip V of Spain
10. Ferdinand Maria, Elector of Bavaria
5. Maria Anna Victoria of Bavaria
11. Henriette Adelaide of Savoy
1. Louis I of Spain
12. Charles Emmanuel II, Duke of Savoy
6. Victor Amadeus II of Sardinia
13. Marie Jeanne Baptiste of Savoy
3. Maria Luisa Gabriella of Savoy
14. Philippe I, Duke of Orléans
7. Anne Marie d'Orléans
15. Henrietta of England

== Sources ==
- Danvila, Alfonso. El reinado relámpago, Luis I y Luisa Isabel de Orleáns, 1707–1724. Madrid: Espasa-Calpe, 1952. Reprinted as Luis I y Luisa Isabel de Orleans: el reinado relámpago. Madrid: Alderabán, 1997.
- Martín, Ricardo Martín Tobías; Cuervo, Ignacio (1998). Historia de España (in Spanish). Barcelona: Salvat. ISBN 84-345-9913-9. OCLC 432782119.
- González Cremona, Juan Manuel (1998). Anecdotario real : de Felipe V a Alfonso XIII (in Spanish). Barcelona: Plaza & Janés Editores. ISBN 84-01-55014-9. OCLC 44057661.
- Vidal Sales, José Antonio (1994). Crónica íntima de los reyes de España (in Spanish). Barcelona, España: Planeta. ISBN 84-08-01139-1. OCLC 31314142.

Louis I of Spain House of Bourbon Cadet branch of the Capetian dynasty Born: 25 August 1707 Died: 31 August 1724
Regnal titles
Preceded by Philip V	King of Spain; 1724	Succeeded by Philip V
Spanish royalty
Preceded by Charles (II)	Prince of Asturias; 1709–1724	Succeeded by Ferdinand (VI)
