= Philip V of Spain =

King of Spain (1700–1724; 1724–1746)

Philip V
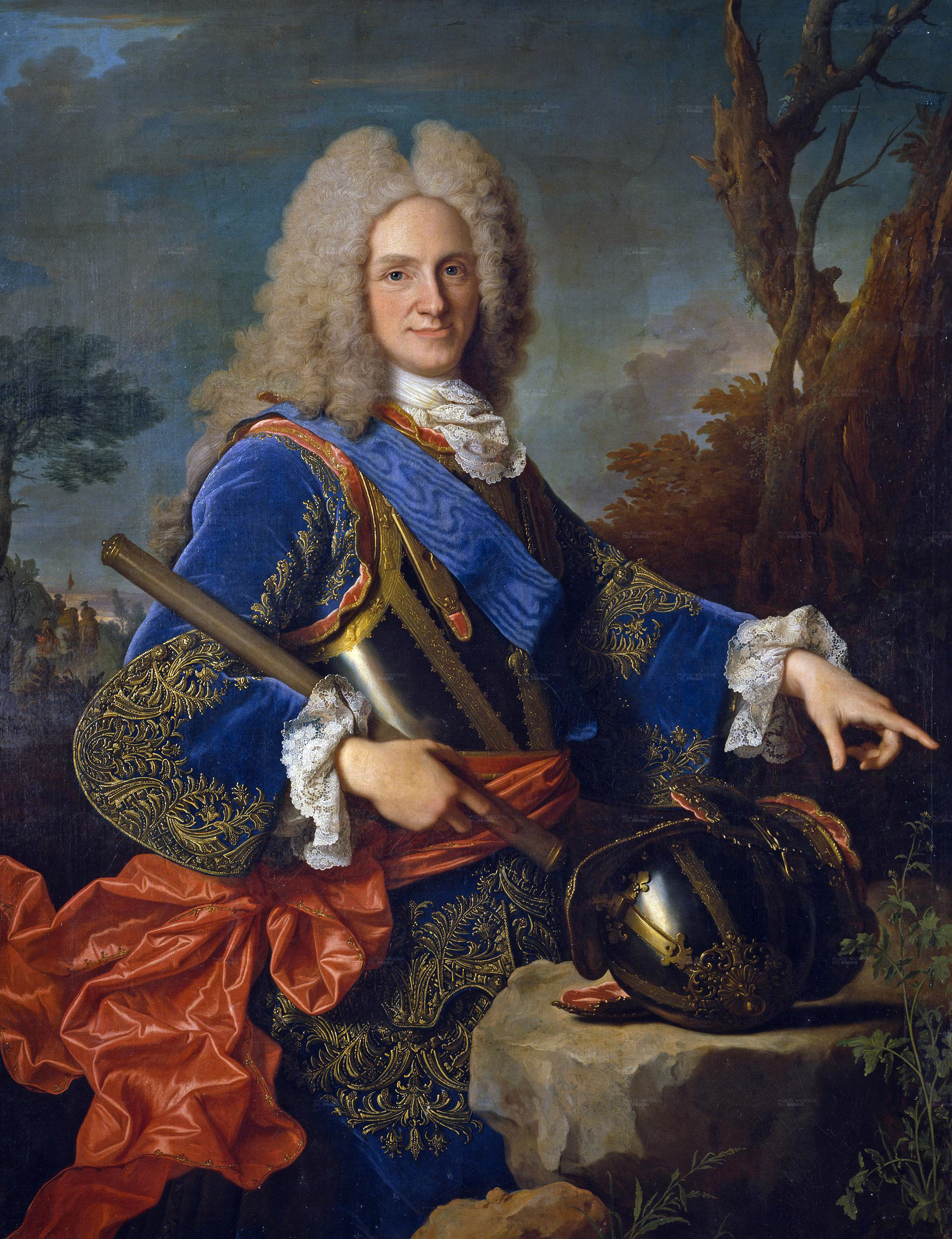
- Portrait by Jean Ranc, c. 1723

King of Spain
- 1st reign: 1 November 1700 – 15 January 1724
- Predecessor: Charles II
- Successor: Louis I
- 2nd reign: 6 September 1724 – 9 July 1746
- Predecessor: Louis I
- Successor: Ferdinand VI
- Chief Ministers: See list: José de Grimaldo The Marquess of the Peace The Duke of Ripperdá José Patiño The Marquess of Villarías

King of Naples and Sardinia
- Reign: 1 November 1700 – 7 March 1714
- Predecessor: Charles V
- Successor: Charles VI

Lord of the Netherlands
- Reign: 1 November 1700 – 10 May 1713
- Predecessor: Charles II
- Successor: Charles III
- Governor: Maximilian II Emanuel, Elector of Bavaria (1700–1706)

Duke of Luxembourg
- Reign: 1700-1712
- Successor: Maximilian II Emanuel, Elector of Bavaria
- Born: Philippe, Duke of Anjou; 19 December 1683; Palace of Versailles, France
- Died: 9 July 1746 (aged 62); Madrid, Spain
- Burial: Royal Palace of La Granja de San Ildefonso
- Spouses: Maria Luisa Gabriella of Savoy (m. 1701; died 1714) Elisabeth Farnese (m. 1714)
- Issue more...: Louis I, King of Spain; Infante Philip Peter; Ferdinand VI, King of Spain; Charles III, King of Spain; Mariana Victoria, Queen of Portugal; Philip, Duke of Parma; María Teresa Rafaela, Dauphine of France; Infante Luis, Count of Chinchón; María Antonia Fernanda, Queen of Sardinia
Names
- Spanish: Felipe de Borbón y Baviera
- House: Bourbon
- Father: Louis, Grand Dauphin
- Mother: Maria Anna Victoria of Bavaria

Philip V (Spanish: Felipe V; French: Philippe; 19 December 1683 – 9 July 1746), known as "the Spirited" (el Animoso), was king of Spain from 1 November 1700 to 14 January 1724 and again from 6 September 1724 to his death in 1746. His total reign (45 years, 9 months and 8 days) is the longest in the history of the Spanish monarchy, surpassing Philip IV. Although his ascent to the throne precipitated the War of the Spanish Succession, Philip V instigated many important reforms in Spain, most especially the centralization of power of the monarchy and the suppression of regional privileges, via the Nueva Planta decrees, and restructuring of the administration of the Spanish Empire on the Iberian Peninsula and its overseas regions.

Philip was born into the French House of Bourbon during the reign of his paternal grandfather King Louis XIV. He was the second son of Louis, Grand Dauphin, and was third in line to the French throne after his father and his elder brother, Louis, Duke of Burgundy. Philip was not expected to become a monarch, but his great-uncle King Charles II of Spain was childless. Philip's father had a strong claim to the Spanish throne, but since he and his elder brother were expected to inherit the French throne, Charles named Philip as his heir in his will. Philip succeeded in 1700 as the first Spanish monarch of the House of Bourbon.

Philip's accession in Spain provoked the 13-year War of the Spanish Succession, which continued until the Treaty of Utrecht forbade any future possibility of unifying the French and Spanish crowns while confirming his accession to the throne of Spain. While Spain maintained its empire in the New World and East Asia, it removed the Spanish Netherlands and Spanish-controlled territories in Italy from the Spanish monarchy, even if the latter were reconquered as additional Bourbon kingdoms during his reign. In 1724, Philip abdicated in favor of his eldest son, Louis I. Louis died later that year, and Philip took the throne again. As a result of his proneness to depression, his second wife, Elisabeth Farnese, held control over the Spanish government. When Philip died in 1746, he was succeeded by his second son, Ferdinand VI.

== Early years ==
=== Birth and family ===
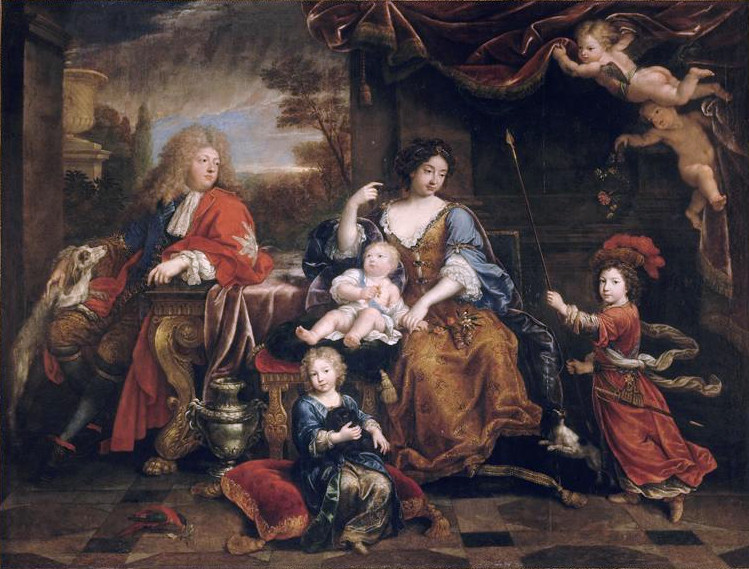
Louis of France, le Grand Dauphin, and his wife Maria Anna Victoria of Bavaria with their three sons: Louis, le Petit Dauphin, Philippe, Duke of Anjou and Charles, Duke of Berry. Painting by Pierre Mignard, 1687.

Philip was born on 19 December 1683 at the Palace of Versailles in France, the second son of Louis, Grand Dauphin, the heir apparent to the throne of France, and his wife Maria Anna Victoria of Bavaria.

Philip was a younger brother of Louis, Duke of Burgundy, the father of Louis XV of France. At birth, Philip was created Duke of Anjou, a traditional title for younger sons in the French royal family. He would be known by this name until he became the King of Spain. Since the Duke of Burgundy was second in line to the French throne after his father, there was little expectation that either Philip or his younger brother Charles, Duke of Berry, would ever rule over France.

=== Upbringing and education ===
Philip lived his first years under the supervision of the royal governess Louise de Prie and after that was tutored with his brothers by François Fénelon, Archbishop of Cambrai. The three siblings were also educated by Paul de Beauvilliers.

=== Claims to the Spanish throne ===
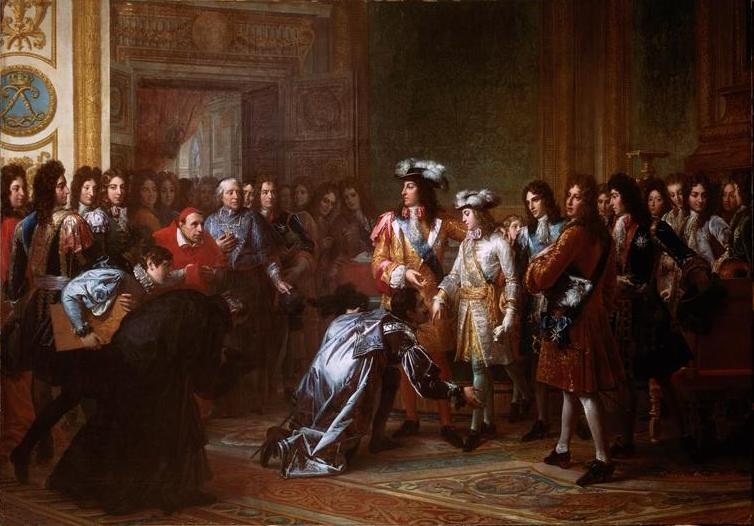
Proclamation of Philip V as King of Spain in the Palace of Versailles on 16 November 1700

In 1700, King Charles II, the last Habsburg to rule Spain, died childless. His will named as successor Philip, grandson of Charles' half-sister Maria Theresa, the first wife of Louis XIV. Upon any possible refusal, the crown of Spain would be offered next to Philip's younger brother, the Duke of Berry, then to the Archduke Charles of Austria, later Holy Roman Emperor Charles VI. Philip had the better genealogical claim to the Spanish throne, because his Spanish grandmother and great-grandmother were older than the ancestors of the Archduke Charles of Austria. However, the Austrians maintained that Philip's grandmother had renounced the Spanish throne for herself and her descendants as part of her marriage contract. That renunciation was contingent on her dowry being paid. The French claim to Spain was due to the dowry having never been paid. In addition to this, while Philip did have a remote claim to the throne of France, Archduke Charles had an even more proximate claim to be Holy Roman Emperor, and his ascension to the throne would have also destabilized the European balance of power.

After a long Royal Council meeting in France at which the Dauphin spoke up in favor of his son's rights, it was agreed that Philip would ascend the throne, and in doing so, forfeit his and his heirs' claim to the throne of France. The Royal Council decided to accept the provisions of the will of Charles II naming Philip king of Spain.

=== First marriage ===
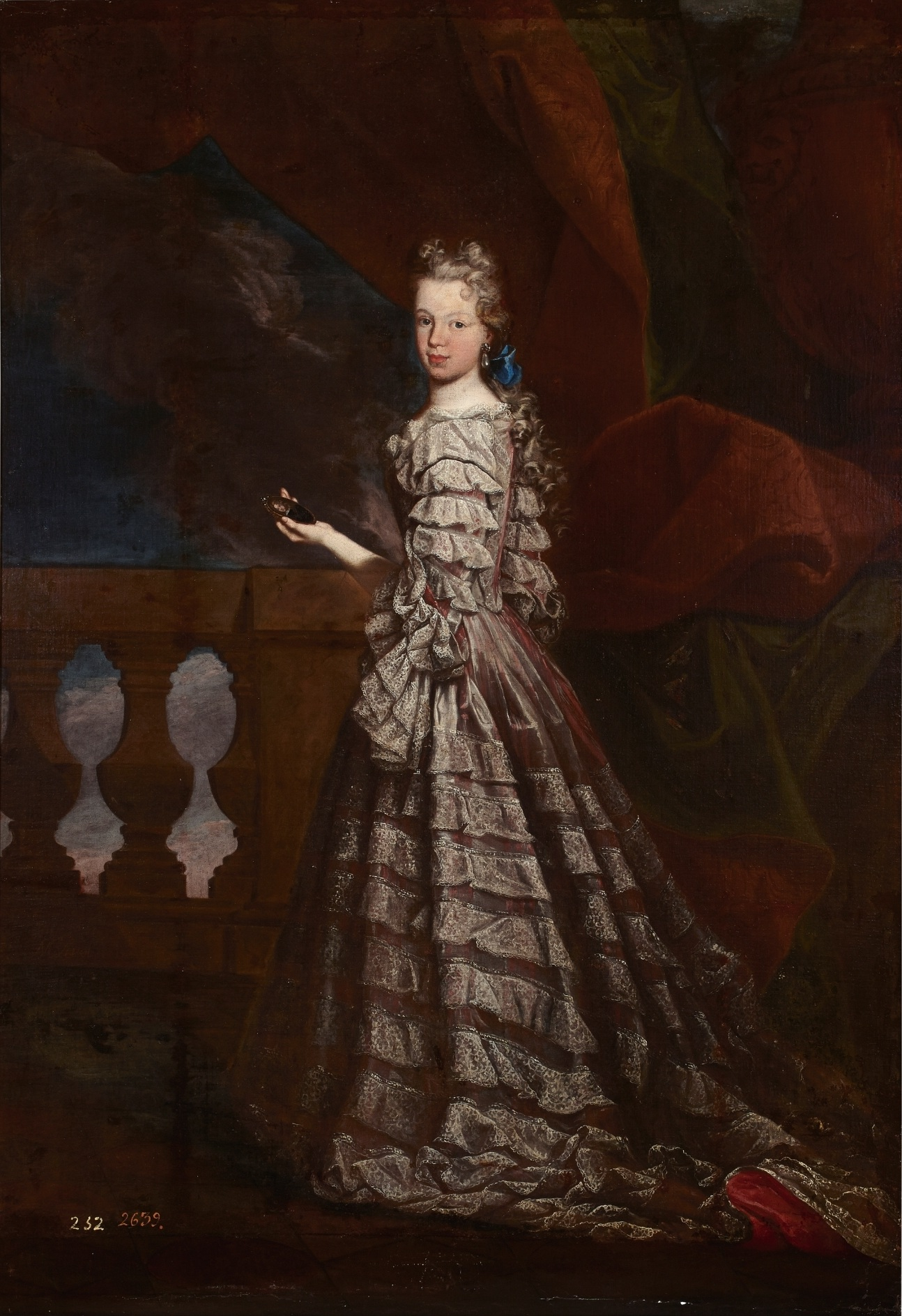
A young Maria Luisa of Savoy holding a miniature portrait of her husband, Philip V

On 2 November 1701, the almost 18-year-old Philip married the 13-year-old Maria Luisa of Savoy, as chosen by his grandfather King Louis XIV. She was the daughter of Victor Amadeus II, Duke of Savoy, and his wife Anne Marie d'Orléans, Philip's first cousin once removed. The Duke and Duchess of Savoy were also the parents of Princess Marie Adélaïde of Savoy, Duchess of Burgundy, Philip's sister-in-law. There was a proxy ceremony at Turin, the capital of the Duchy of Savoy, and another one at Versailles on 11 September.

Maria Luisa proved very popular as Queen of Spain. She served as regent for her husband on several occasions. Her most successful term was when Philip was away touring his Italian domains for nine months in 1702, when she was just 14 years old. On entering Naples that year he was presented with Gian Lorenzo Bernini's Boy with a Dragon. In 1714, Maria Luisa died at the age of 26 from tuberculosis, a devastating emotional blow to her husband.

== War of the Spanish Succession ==
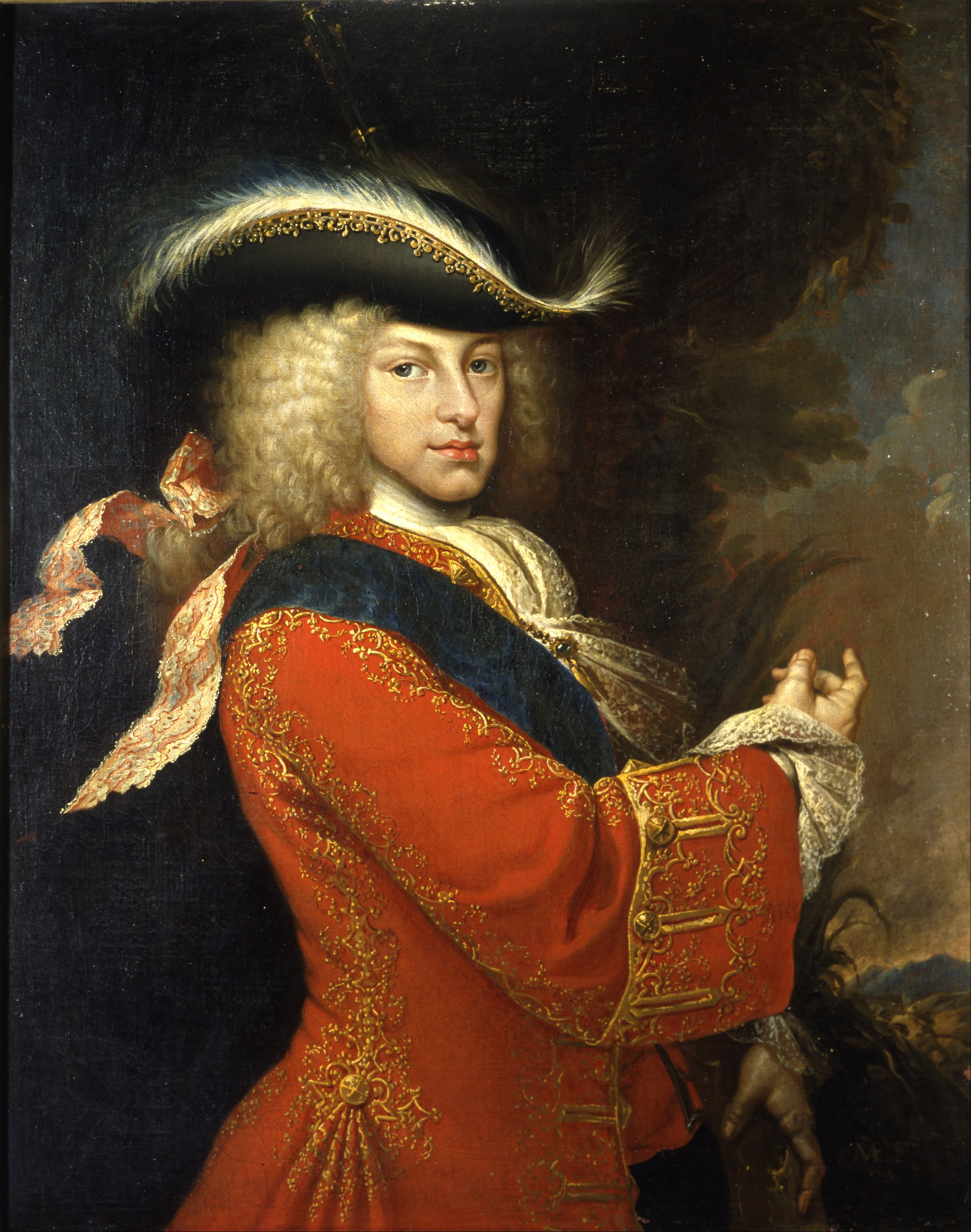
Philip V in hunting attire.

The actions of Louis XIV heightened the fears of the English, the Dutch and the Austrians, among others. In December 1700, Louis XIV issued letters patent to Philip, prior to Philip leaving France, preserving his status as a régnicole (a natural Frenchman), and by extension his claim to the French throne, despite his permanent departure from France. The documents further granted Philip's male heirs status as régnicoles, and therefore as French dynasts, despite their births abroad.

Almost immediately the War of the Spanish Succession began. Concern among other European powers that Spain and France united under a single Bourbon monarch would upset the balance of power pitted France and Spain against the Grand Alliance of England, the Dutch Republic and Austria.

Inside Spain, the Crown of Castile supported Philip of France. On the other hand, anti-French sentiment was strong in Aragon and some members of the nobility of the Crown of Aragon rallied behind Charles of Austria, son of Leopold I, Holy Roman Emperor and claimant to the Spanish throne by right of his grandmother Maria Anna of Spain. Their support swayed a significant portion of the population to support the Archduke.

The war was centred in Spain and west-central Europe (especially the Low Countries), with other important fighting in Germany and Italy. Prince Eugene of Savoy and John Churchill, 1st Duke of Marlborough distinguished themselves as military commanders in those theatres. In colonial North America, the conflict became known to the English colonists who fought against French and Spanish forces as Queen Anne's War. Over the course of the fighting, some 400,000 people were killed.

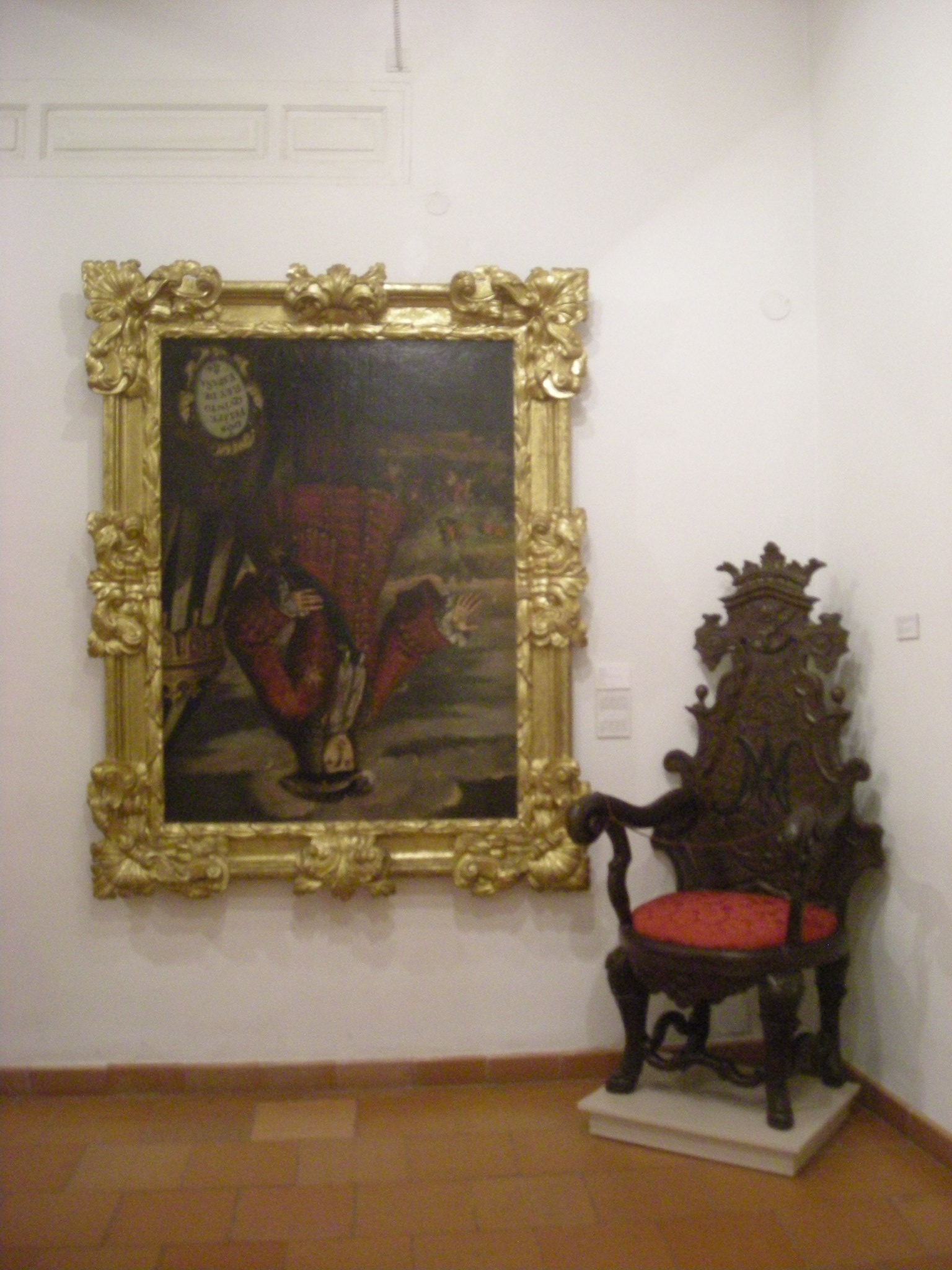
Portrait of Philip V of Spain exhibited upside down in the Museum of Almodí, Xàtiva, for having burned the city in 1707.

It was with this war as a backdrop that, beginning in 1707, Philip issued the Nueva Planta decrees, which centralized Spanish rule under the Castilian political and administrative model and in the process abolished the charters of all independently administered kingdoms within Spain—most notably the Crown of Aragon, which was supporting Charles VI in the conflict—except for the Kingdom of Navarre and the rest of the Basque region, who had supported Philip in the war for the Spanish throne, and retained their semi-autonomous self-government. The policy of centralization had as model the French State under Louis XIV and was strongly supported by politicians such as Joseph de Solís and the Sardinian political philosopher Vicente Bacallar.

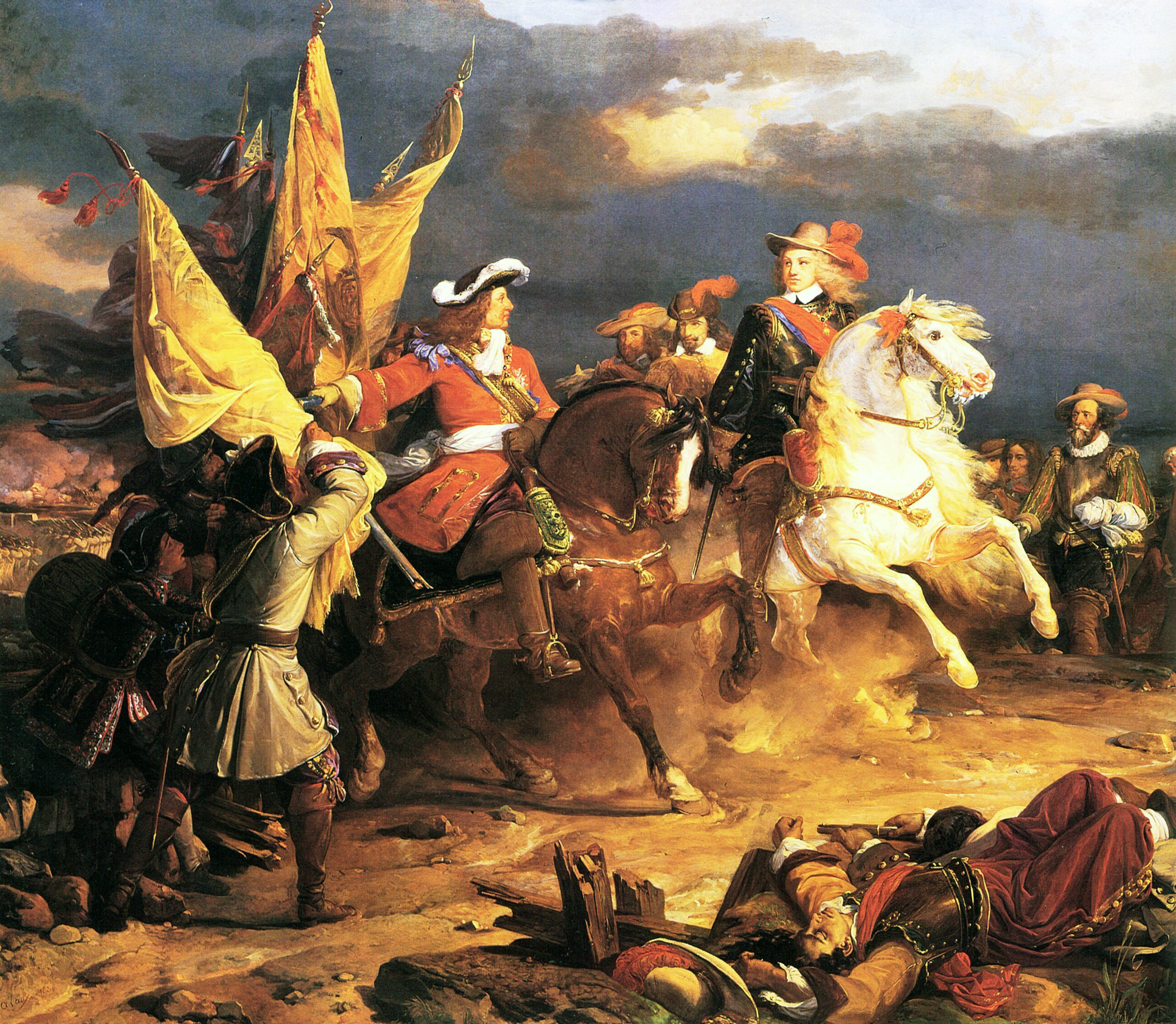
Philip (right) at the Battle of Villaviciosa in 1710.

Philip agreed to relinquish his right of succession to France under one condition: the introduction of semi-Salic law in Spain. Under this law, the succession to the Spanish crown was limited to his entire male line before it could pass to any female, a requirement made clear to the allies during the preliminary peace negotiations. The purpose of this may have been to ensure that Philip and his male heirs, who under normal circumstances would inherit the French throne should the male line of Louis, Duke of Burgundy be extinguished, would always have a throne to occupy in its place. It was not until this was successfully accomplished (10 May 1713) that Spain and Great Britain made their own peace terms at the second Treaty of Utrecht (annexing the new law to the Treaty). By the terms of the Treaty of Utrecht that concluded the war, Philip was recognized as king of Spain but was forced to cede Menorca and Gibraltar to Great Britain; the Spanish Netherlands, Naples, Milan, and Sardinia to the Austrian Habsburgs; and Sicily and parts of Milan to Savoy. To further ensure the removal of Philip and his heirs from the French succession, the letters patent issued to preserve their claim to the throne despite their absence from the country, were repealed by the Parlement of Paris.

These losses greatly diminished the Spanish Empire in Europe, which had already been in decline. Throughout his reign, Philip sought to reverse the decline of Spanish power. Trying to overturn the terms of the Treaty of Utrecht, he attempted to re-establish Spanish claims in Italy, triggering the War of the Quadruple Alliance (1718–1720) in which Spain fought a coalition of four major powers. France, under the regency of Philippe II, Duke of Orléans later joined this coalition, as the House of Orléans had a strong interest in keeping Philip and his descendants out of the line of succession. Lacking allies, Philip V was forced to sue for peace.

=== Second marriage ===
Shortly after the death of Queen Maria Luisa in 1714, the King decided to marry again. His second wife was Elisabeth of Parma, daughter of Odoardo Farnese, Hereditary Prince of Parma, and Dorothea Sophie of the Palatinate. At the age of 22, on 24 December 1714, she was married to the 31-year-old Philip by proxy in Parma. The marriage was arranged by Cardinal Giulio Alberoni, with the concurrence of the Princesse des Ursins, the Camarera mayor de Palacio ("chief of the household") of the king of Spain. They had sons, including another successor, Charles III of Spain.

=== Abdication ===
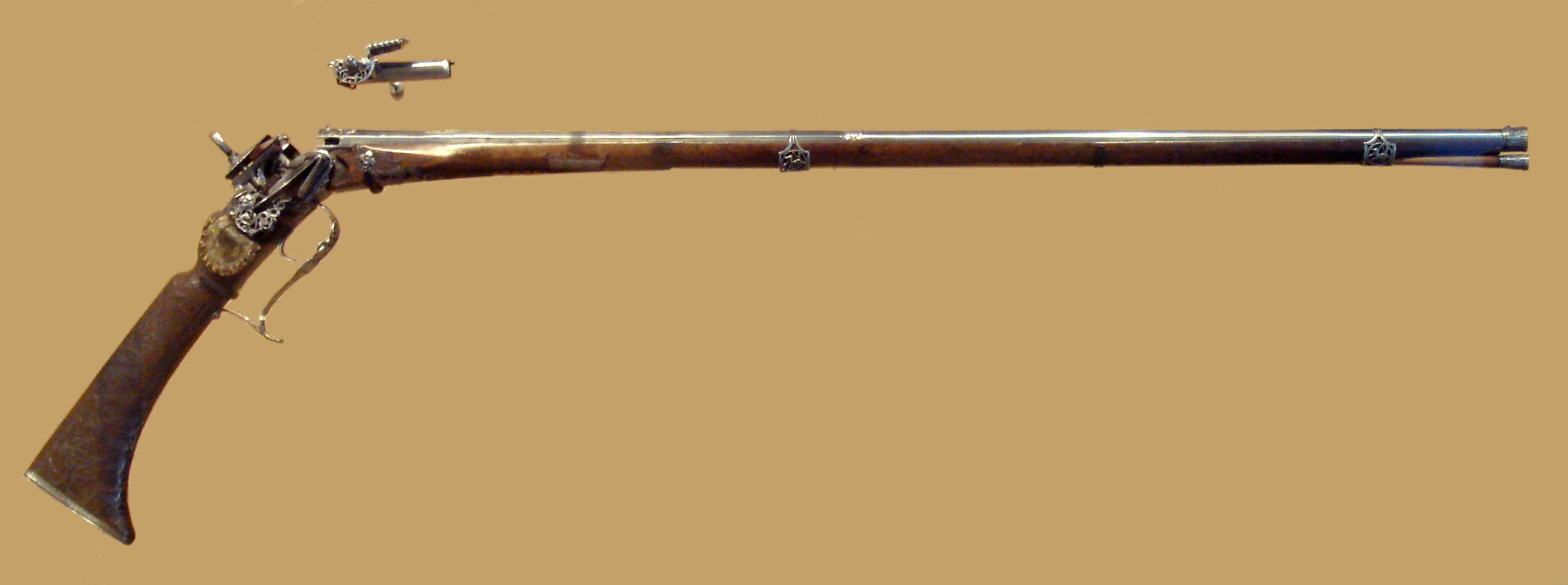
A breech loading miquelet musket with a reusable cartridge, used by Philip V, made by A. Tienza, Madrid, circa 1715.

On 14 January 1724, Philip abdicated the Spanish throne to his eldest son, the seventeen-year-old Louis I. As the abdication occurred just over a month after the death of the Duke of Orléans, who had been regent for Louis XV of France, many at the time believed it was an attempt by Philip to circumvent the Treaty of Utrecht, which forbade a union of the French and Spanish crowns, therefore allowing him to claim the former should his young nephew perish without sons of his own. However, the actual reason for the abdication was that Philip, who exhibited many elements of mental instability during his reign, no longer wished to rule due to his increasing mental decline. However, Louis I died on 31 August in Madrid of smallpox, having reigned only seven months and leaving no issue. Six days later, after much convincing, Philip was restored to the Spanish throne, so as to avoid a regency for his second son, Ferdinand, who was only 10 at the time.

== Later reign ==
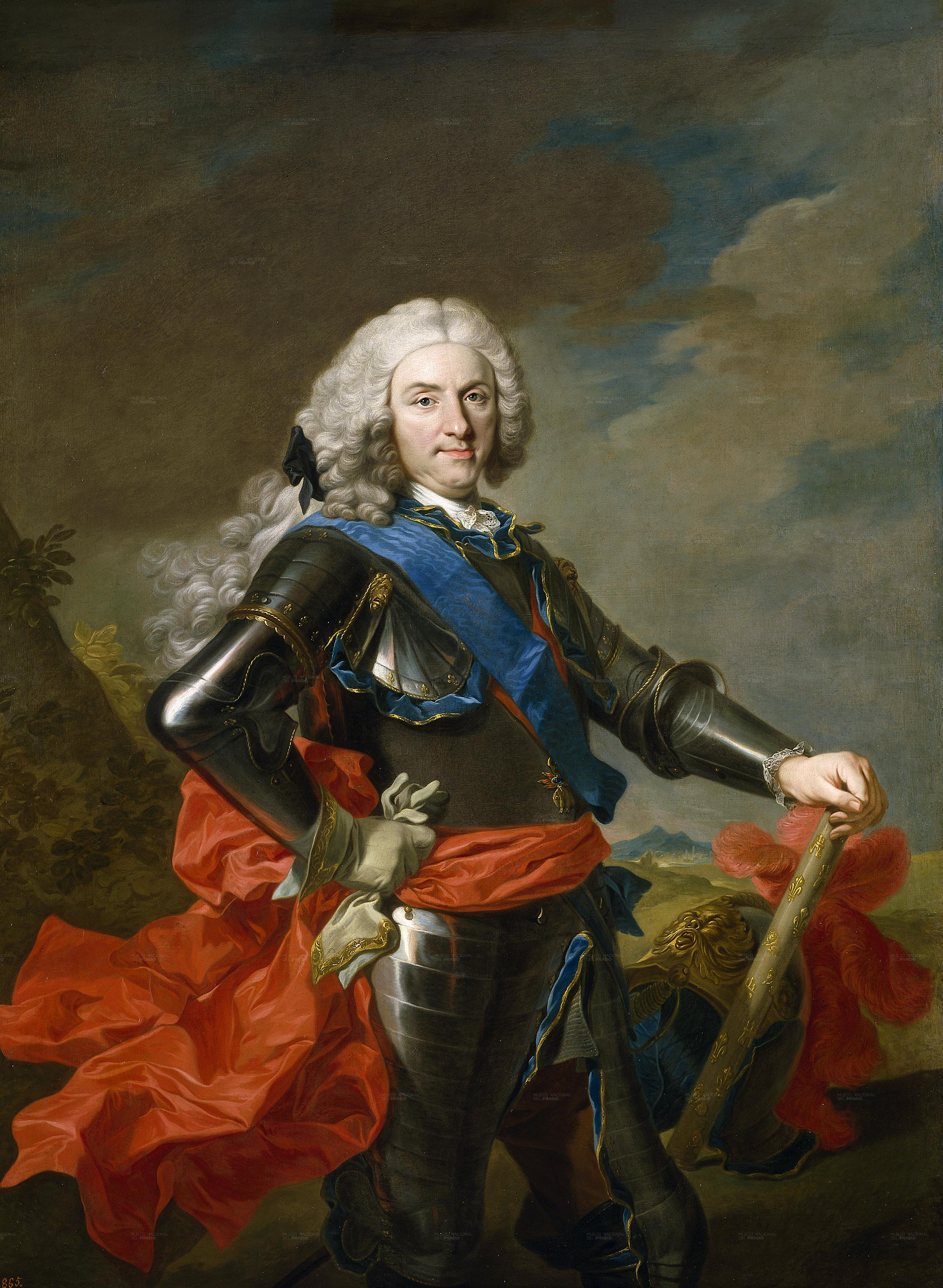
Portrait by Louis-Michel van Loo, c. 1739

Philip helped his Bourbon relatives to make territorial gains in the War of the Spanish Succession and the War of the Austrian Succession by reconquering Naples and Sicily from Austria and Oran from the Ottomans. Finally, at the end of his reign Spanish forces defended their American territories from a large British invasion during the War of Jenkins' Ear (1739–1748).

During Philip's reign, Spain began to recover from the stagnation it had suffered during the twilight of the Spanish Habsburg dynasty. Although the population of Spain grew, the financial and taxation systems were archaic and the treasury ran deficits.

The King employed thousands of highly paid retainers at his palaces, not to assist with ruling the country, but rather to look after the royal family. Meanwhile, the army and bureaucracy went months without pay. It was only the shipments of silver from the New World which kept the system going. Spain suspended payments on its debt in 1739 – effectively declaring bankruptcy.

=== Death ===
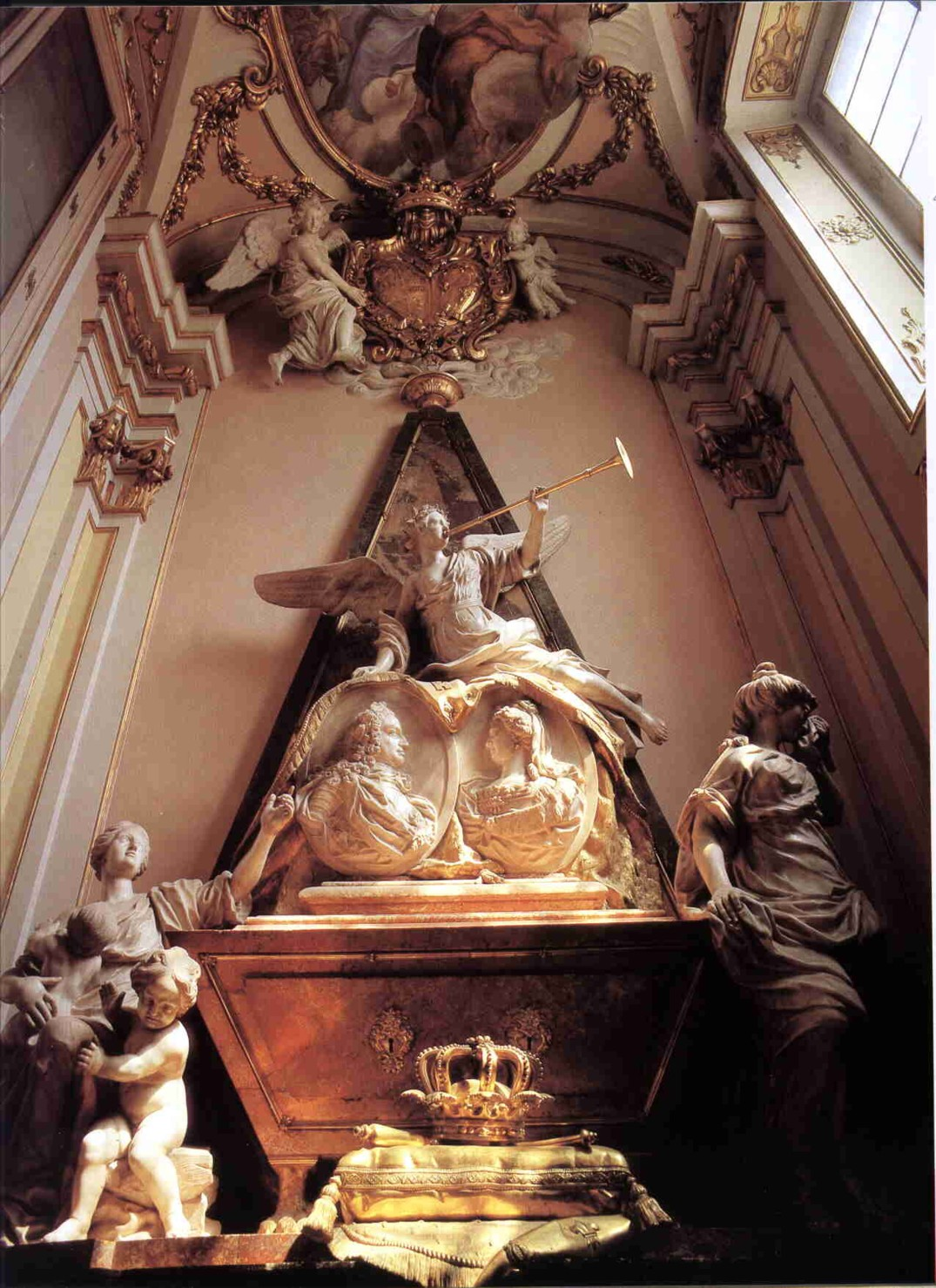
Tomb of Philip V and Elizabeth Farnese in the Collegiate Church of the Holy Trinity, in the Royal Palace of La Granja de San Ildefonso (Segovia).

In the last decade of his reign, Philip experienced bouts of manic depression and increasingly fell victim to a deep melancholia. During this period his second wife, Elizabeth Farnese, seems to have dedicated herself exclusively to caring for his health. Beginning in August 1737 his mental illness was eased by the castrato singer Farinelli, who became the "Musico de Camara of Their Majesties." Farinelli would sing eight or nine arias for the King and Queen every night, usually with a trio of musicians.

Philip suffered a stroke and died on 9 July 1746 in El Escorial, in Madrid, but was buried in his favorite Royal Palace of La Granja de San Ildefonso, near Segovia. Ferdinand VI of Spain, his son by his first queen Maria Luisa of Savoy, succeeded him.

== Legacy ==
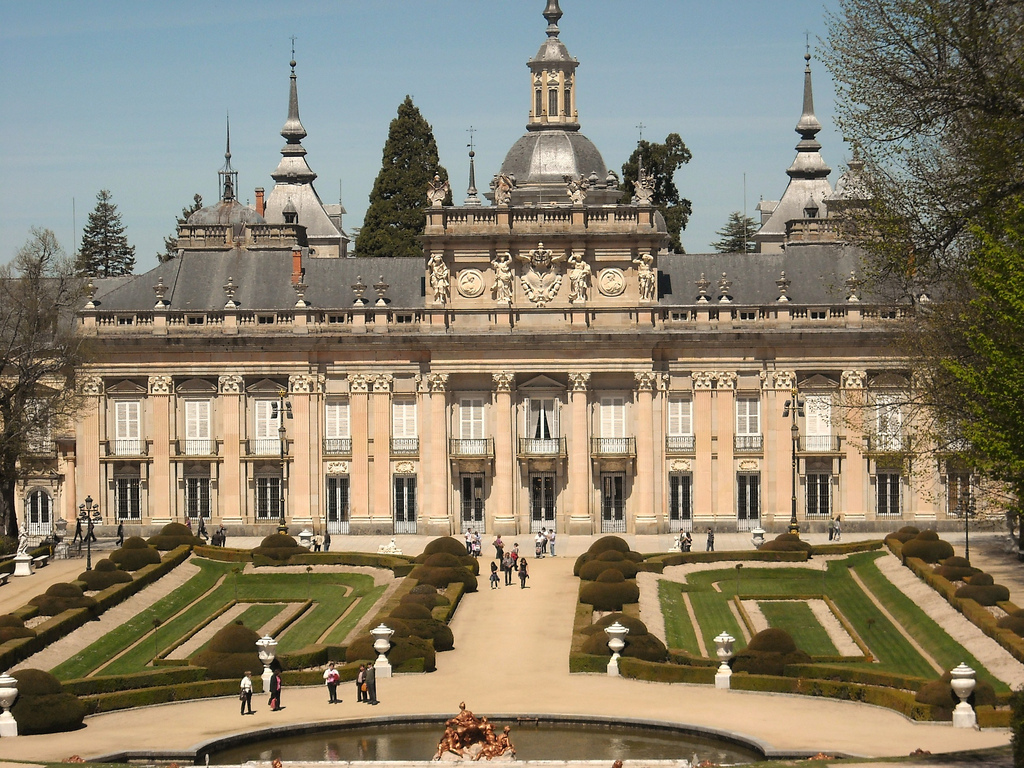
La Granja Royal Palace

Historians have generally been unkind to the King. Lynch says Philip V advanced the government only marginally over that of his predecessors and was more of a liability than Charles II. When a conflict came up between the interests of Spain and France, he usually favored France.

However, Philip made some reforms in government, and strengthened the central authorities relative to the provinces. Merit became more important, although most senior positions still went to the landed aristocracy. Below the elite level, the inefficiency and corruption that had existed under Charles II was as widespread as ever. The reforms started by Philip V culminated in much more important reforms of Charles III.

The economy, on the whole, improved over the previous half-century, with greater productivity, and fewer famines and epidemics. The government promoted industry, agriculture and shipbuilding. After the destruction of the main silver fleet at Vigo in 1702, the navy was rebuilt. Nevertheless, the new fleet was still too small to support the vast worldwide empire.

To commemorate the indignities the city of Xàtiva suffered after Philip's victory in the Battle of Almansa in the War of the Spanish Succession, in which he ordered the city to be burned and renamed San Felipe, the portrait of the monarch hangs upside down in the local museum of L'Almodí.

The province of the New Philippines, which occupied parts of what is now Texas in the United States, was named in 1716 in honor of Philip.

Philip V favored and promoted the Atlantic trade of Spain with its American possessions, ending the monopoly of Seville on colonial trade. During this Atlantic trade emerged important figures of the naval history of Spain, among which stands out the privateers Amaro Pargo and Miguel Enríquez. Philip V frequently supported Pargo in his commercial incursions: he granted a royal order given at the Royal Palace of El Pardo in Madrid in September 1714, in which he appointed him captain of a commercial ship bound for Caracas. The Monarch also interceded in his liberation during his detention by the Casa de Contratación of Cádiz and authorized him to build a ship bound for Campeche, which was armed like a corsair ship.

== Issue ==
Philip married his double-second cousin Maria Luisa of Savoy (17 September 1688 – 14 February 1714) on 3 November 1701 and they had 4 sons, two of which reached adulthood and became kings of Spain, but they all died with no children:

1. Louis I of Spain (25 August 1707 – 31 August 1724) married Louise Élisabeth d'Orléans but had no children.
2. Infante Philip of Spain (2 July 1709 – 18 July 1709) died young.
3. Infante Philip of Spain (7 June 1712 – 29 December 1719) died young.
4. Ferdinand VI of Spain (23 September 1713 – 10 August 1759) married Barbara of Portugal but had no surviving children.

Philip married Elisabeth Farnese (25 October 1692 – 11 July 1766) on 24 December 1714, they had 7 children, of whom all but one reached adulthood:

1. Charles III of Spain (20 January 1716 – 14 December 1788) married Maria Amalia of Saxony and had children.
2. Infante Francisco of Spain (21 March 1717 – 21 April 1717) died young.
3. Infanta Mariana Victoria of Spain (31 March 1718 – 15 January 1781) married King Joseph I of Portugal and had children.
4. Infante Philip of Spain (15 March 1720 – 18 July 1765) Duke of Parma and founder of the line of Bourbons of Parma married Louise Élisabeth of France and had children.
5. Infanta Maria Teresa of Spain (11 June 1726 – 22 July 1746) married Louis, Dauphin of France and had children.
6. Infante Louis of Spain (25 July 1727 – 7 August 1785), known as the Cardinal Infante. Was Archbishop of Toledo, Primate of Spain and cardinal since 1735. In 1754, renounced his ecclesiastical titles and became Count of Chinchón. In 1776, he married morganatically María Teresa de Vallabriga and had children, but without royal titles.
7. Infanta Maria Antonia of Spain (17 November 1729 – 19 September 1785) married Victor Amadeus III of Sardinia and had children.

Family of Philip V in 1743

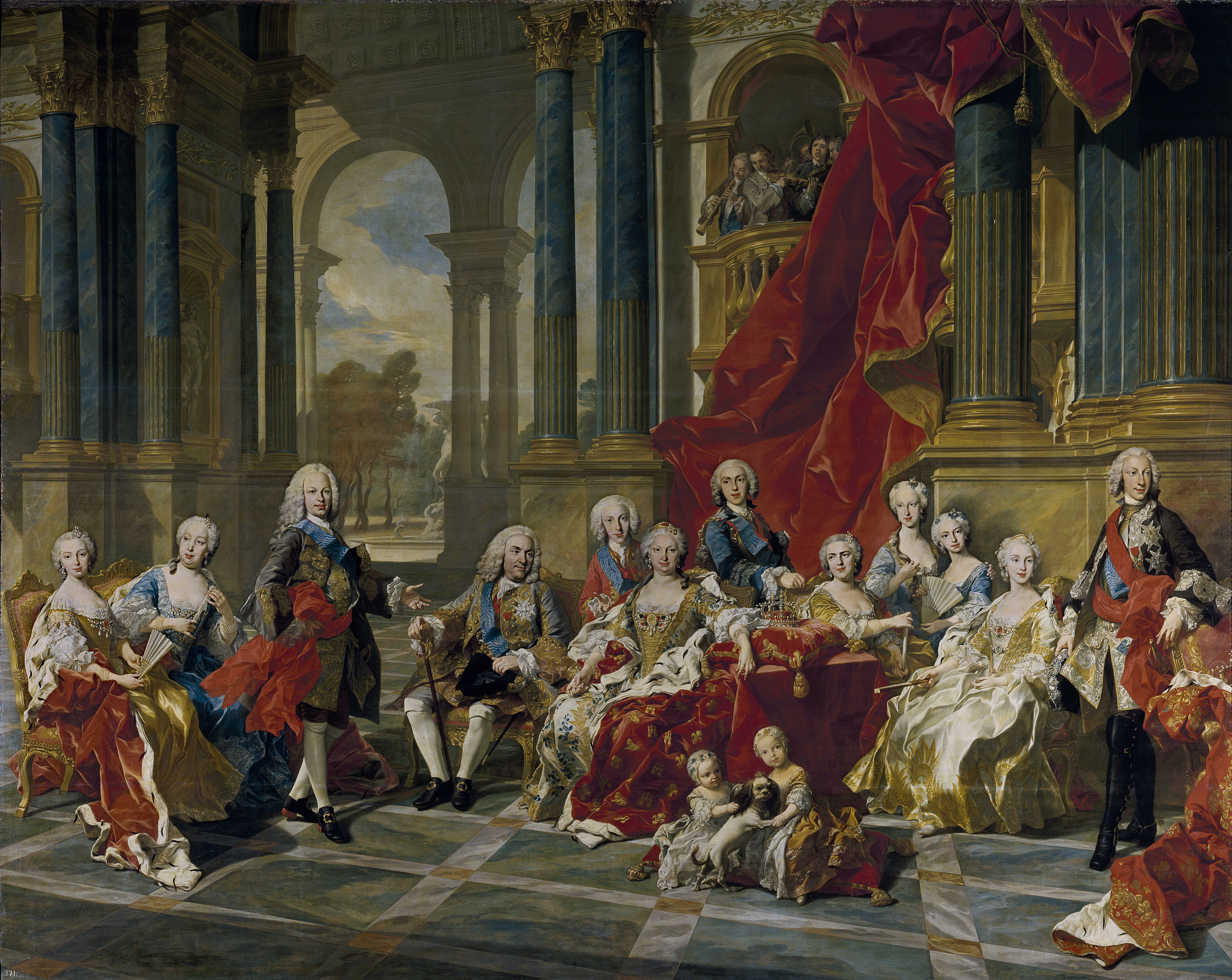
"The Family of Felipe V"; (L-R) Mariana Victoria, Princess of Brazil; Barbara, Princess of Asturias; Ferdinand, Prince of Asturias; King Philip V; Luis, Count of Chinchón; Elisabeth Farnese; Infante Philip; Louise Élisabeth of France; Infanta Maria Teresa; Infanta Maria Antonia; Maria Amalia, Queen of Naples and Sicily; Charles King of Naples and Sicily. The two children in the foreground are Princess Maria Isabella Anne of Naples and Sicily and Infanta Isabella of Spain (daughter of the future Duke of Parma)

== Ancestry ==
Ancestors of Philip V of Spain

8. Louis XIII of France
4. Louis XIV of France
9. Anne of Spain
2. Louis, Dauphin of France
10. Philip IV of Spain
5. Maria Theresa of Spain
11. Elisabeth of France
1. Philip V, King of Spain
12. Maximilian I, Elector of Bavaria
6. Ferdinand Maria, Elector of Bavaria
13. Maria Anna of Austria
3. Maria Anna Victoria of Bavaria
14. Victor Amadeus I, Duke of Savoy
7. Henriette Adelaide of Savoy
15. Christine of France

== Coins ==
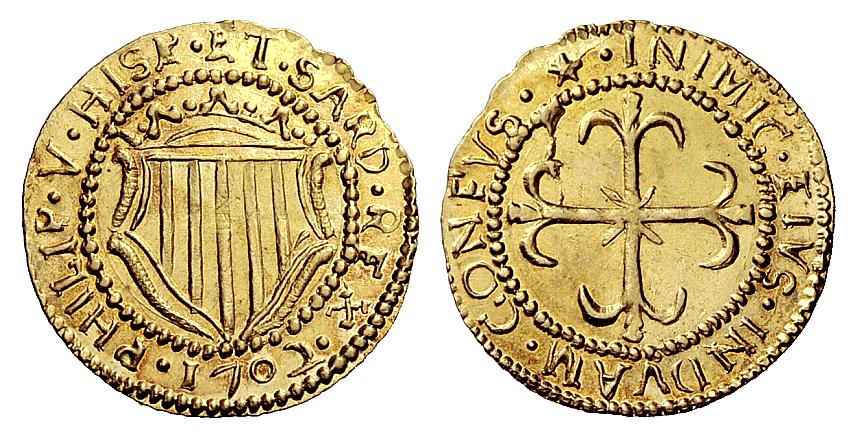
1 Escudo as Philip IV of Sardinia

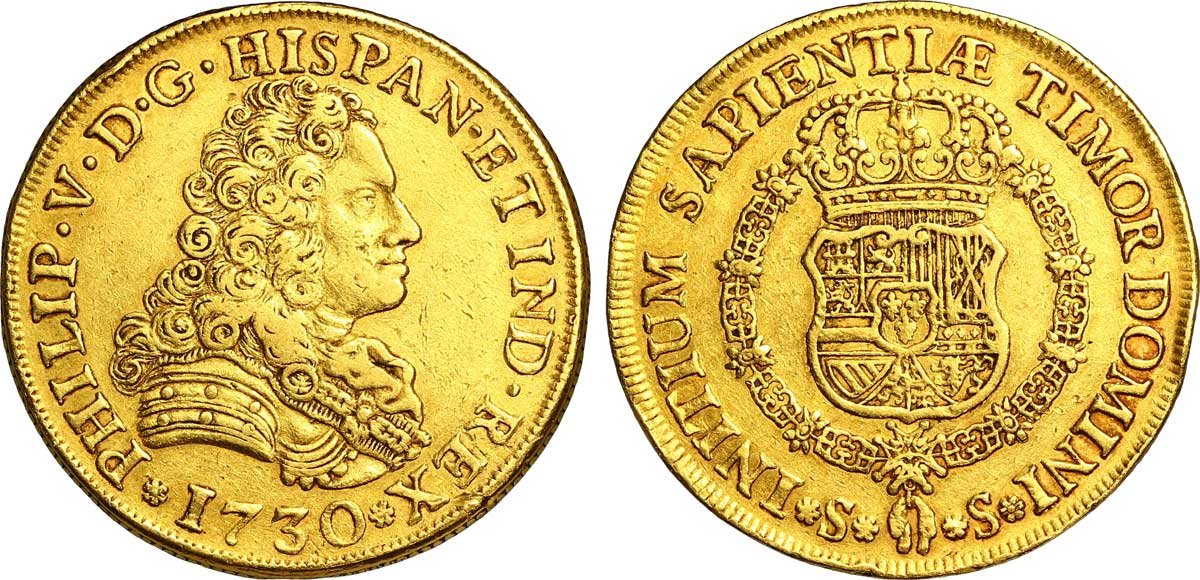
8 Escudos, Seville

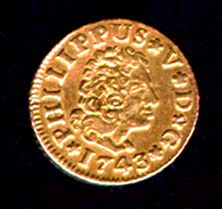
Half escudo gold coin of Philip V, 1743

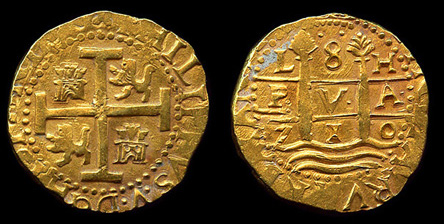
8 Escudos, Lima 1710

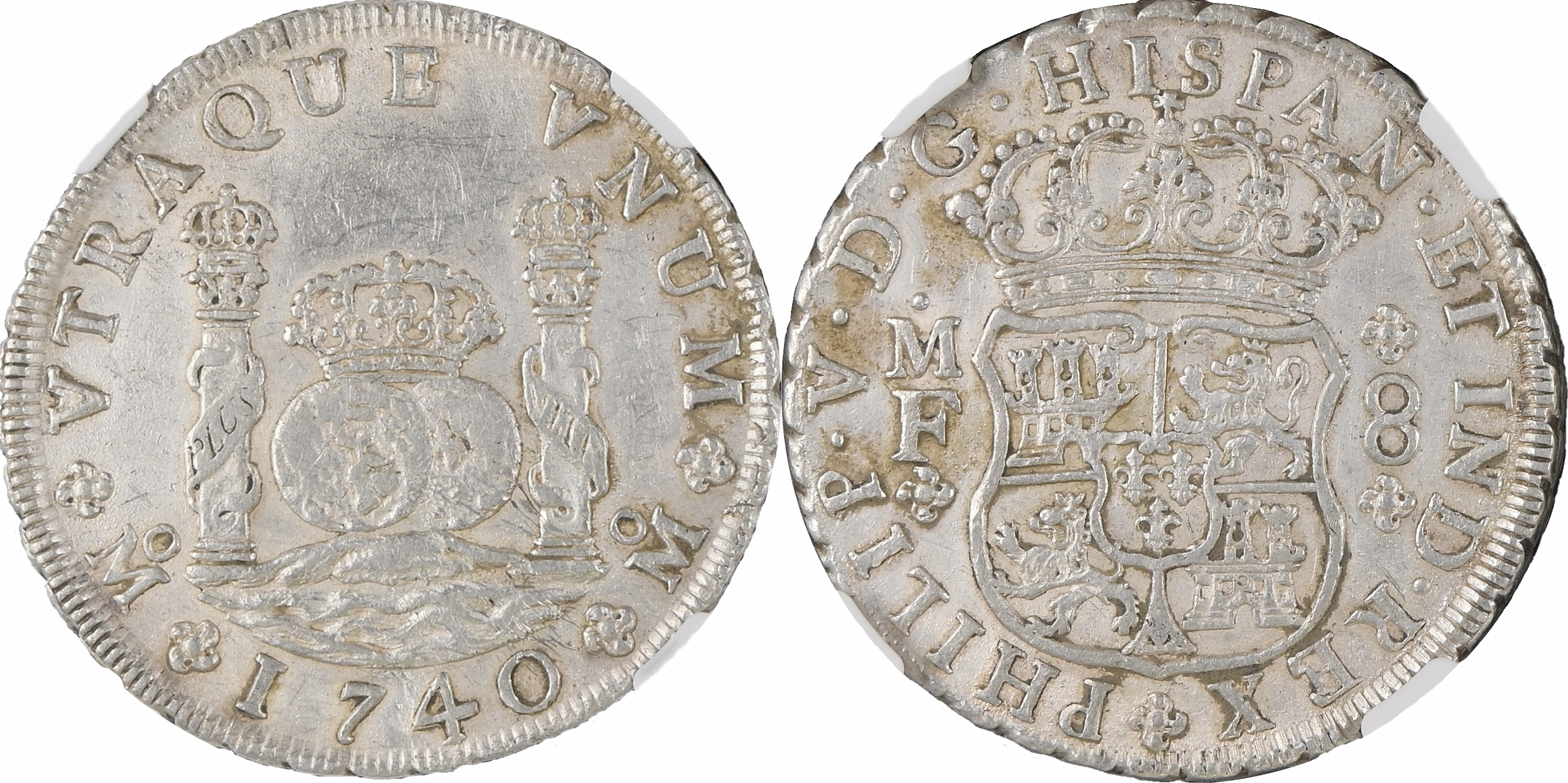
8 Reales, Mexico

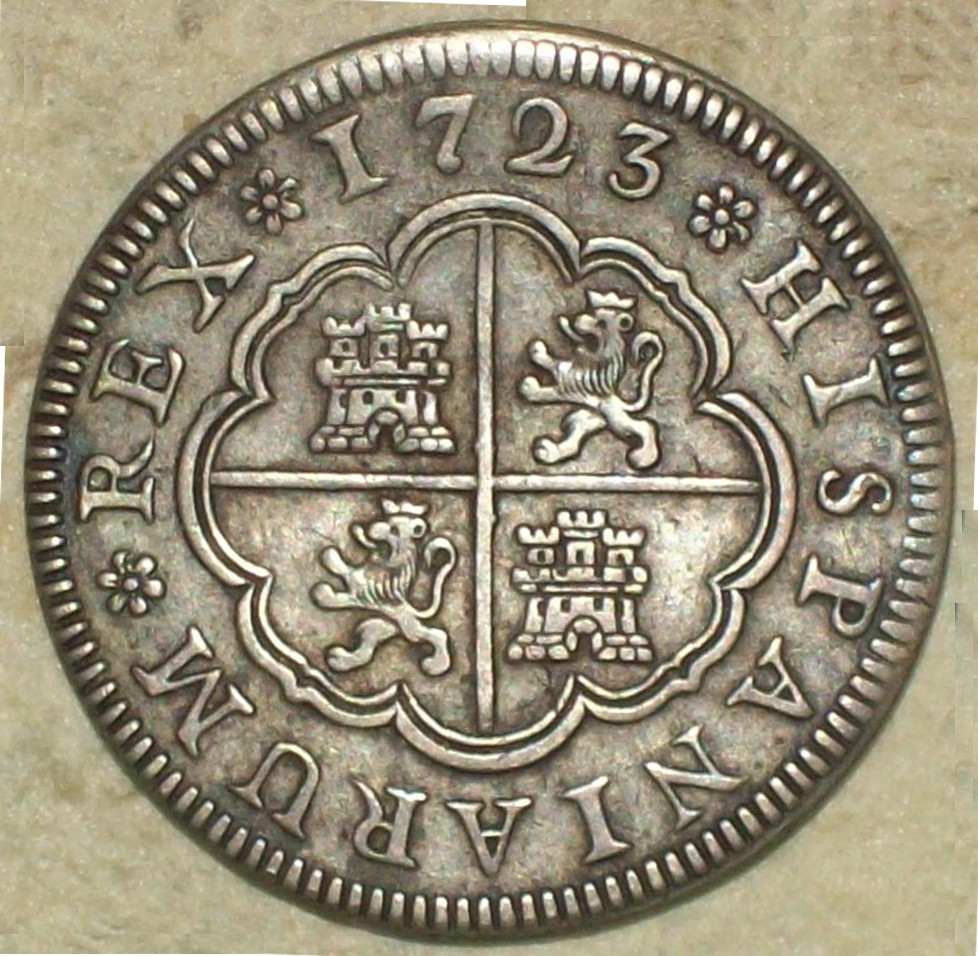
2 Reales, Segovia

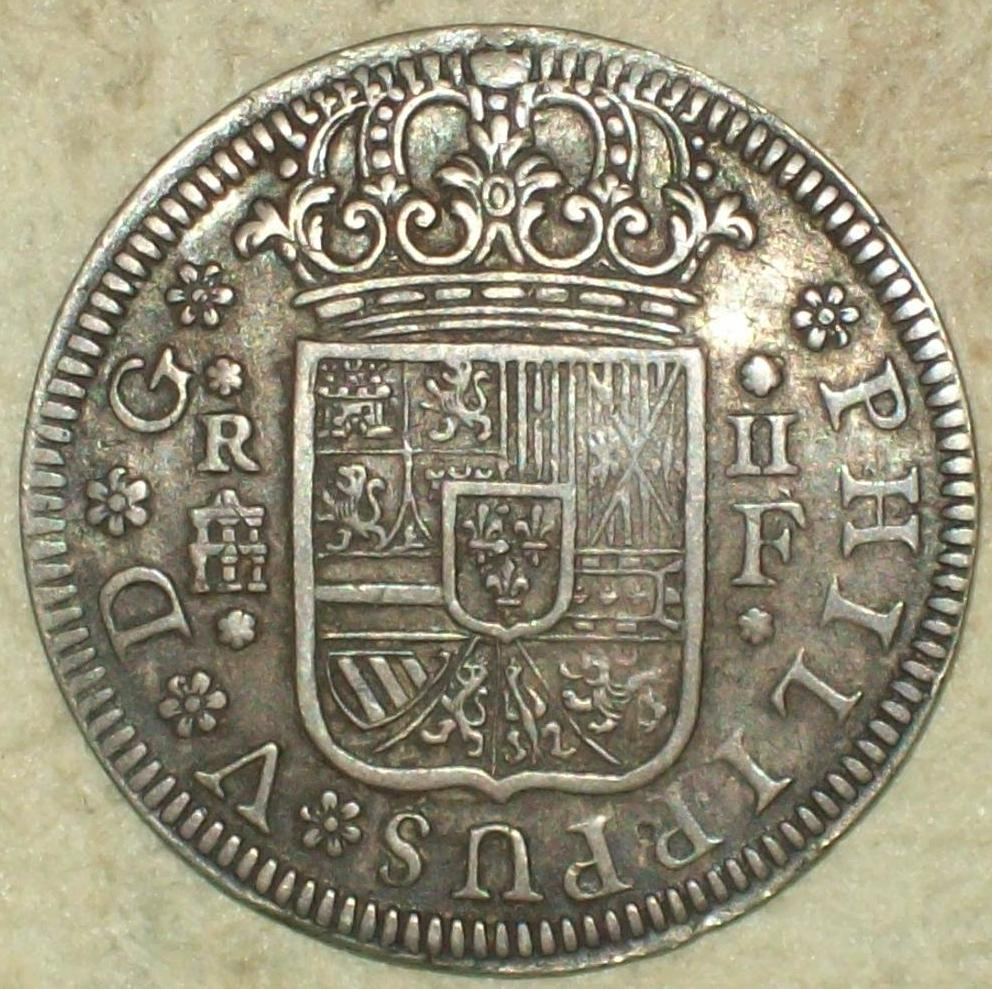
2 Reales, Segovia

== Heraldry ==
Heraldry of Philip V of Spain

Coat of Arms as Duke of Anjou	Coat of arms as King of Spain (Common Version)	Ornamented Version
Coat of arms as King of Naples (1700–1713)	Coat of arms as King of Sicily (1700–1713)	Coat of arms as Duke of Milan (1700–1706)
Lesser coat of arms of King of Spain	Coat of arms as King of Galicia	Great ornamented version as King of Navarre

== See also ==
- Nueva Planta decrees
- Royal Madrilenian Academy of Medicine

== Sources ==
- Kamen, Henry (2001). Philip V of Spain: The King Who Reigned Twice. New Haven, Conn.: Yale University Press. ISBN 0-300-08718-7.
- Lynch, John (1989). Bourbon Spain 1700–1808.
- Payne, Stanley G. (1973). A History of Spain and Portugal. Vol. 2. Madison: University of Wisconsin Press.

Philip V of Spain House of Bourbon Cadet branch of the Capetian dynasty Born: 19 December 1683 Died: 9 July 1746
Regnal titles
Preceded by Charles II	King of Naples and Sardinia; Duke of Brabant, Limburg, Lothier, and Milan; Count of Flanders and Hainaut; 1700–1714	Succeeded by Charles VI & V
Preceded by Charles II	Duke of Luxembourg; Count of Namur; 1700–1712	Succeeded by Maximilian II Emanuel
Preceded by Charles II	King of Sicily; 1700–1713	Succeeded by Victor Amadeus II
Preceded by Charles II	King of Spain; 1700–1724	Succeeded by Louis I
Preceded by Louis I	King of Spain; 1724–1746	Succeeded by Ferdinand VI
French royalty
Preceded by Louis François	Duke of Anjou; 1683–1700	Succeeded by Louis XV
