= Aubaine =

Feudal right of foreign inheritance

In old French customs, aubaine (French pronunciation: [obɛn], windfall) was an originally feudal right regulating the inheritance of goods from a foreigner who died in a country where he was not naturalized. The word is formed from aubain, a foreigner, which Gilles Ménage derived further from the Latin alibi natus; Jacques Cujas derived from advena; and du Cange from albanus, a Scot or Irishman, by the reason that these were anciently frequent travelers living abroad.

The opposite of an aubain was a régnicole, someone who died outside the French kingdom but was a royal subject by birth and residence.

In the Ancien Régime, aubaine was a right of the King of France, allowing him to claim the inheritance of all foreigners in his dominions; exclusive of all other lords, and even of any testament the deceased could make. An ambassador, though not naturalized, was not subject to the right of aubaine. The Swiss, Savoyards, Scots, and Portuguese were also exempted from aubaine, as they were considered naturalized. This right applied to every holder of a secular or church fief. It also applied to abandoned children, but the holder of the right was the owner of the place where the child was left, who could thus recoup the costs of the care and education of the child if there were no inheritors.

This right was a major risk for foreign traders at fairs, foreign contractors and workers in manufactures, mercenary soldiers, foreigners with rents or securities, and cities with large foreign populations. To give them security while generating state revenue, the right of aubaine was transformed into a tax on foreigners: for a 5% tax on the value of the property of the deceased, the king waived his right of aubaine for the nationals of Geneva (1608), Holland (1685), England (1739), Denmark (1742), Naples, Spain and other Bourbon lands in Europe (1762), the duchy of Tuscany (1768), and the duchy of Parma (1769).

The right of aubaine was abolished by the French Revolutionary Assembly. Reinstated in the Napoleonic Code of 1803, it was finally abolished in 1819 under the Restoration.
