= Infante Philip of Spain (1712–1719) =

Spanish prince

Infante Philip Peter
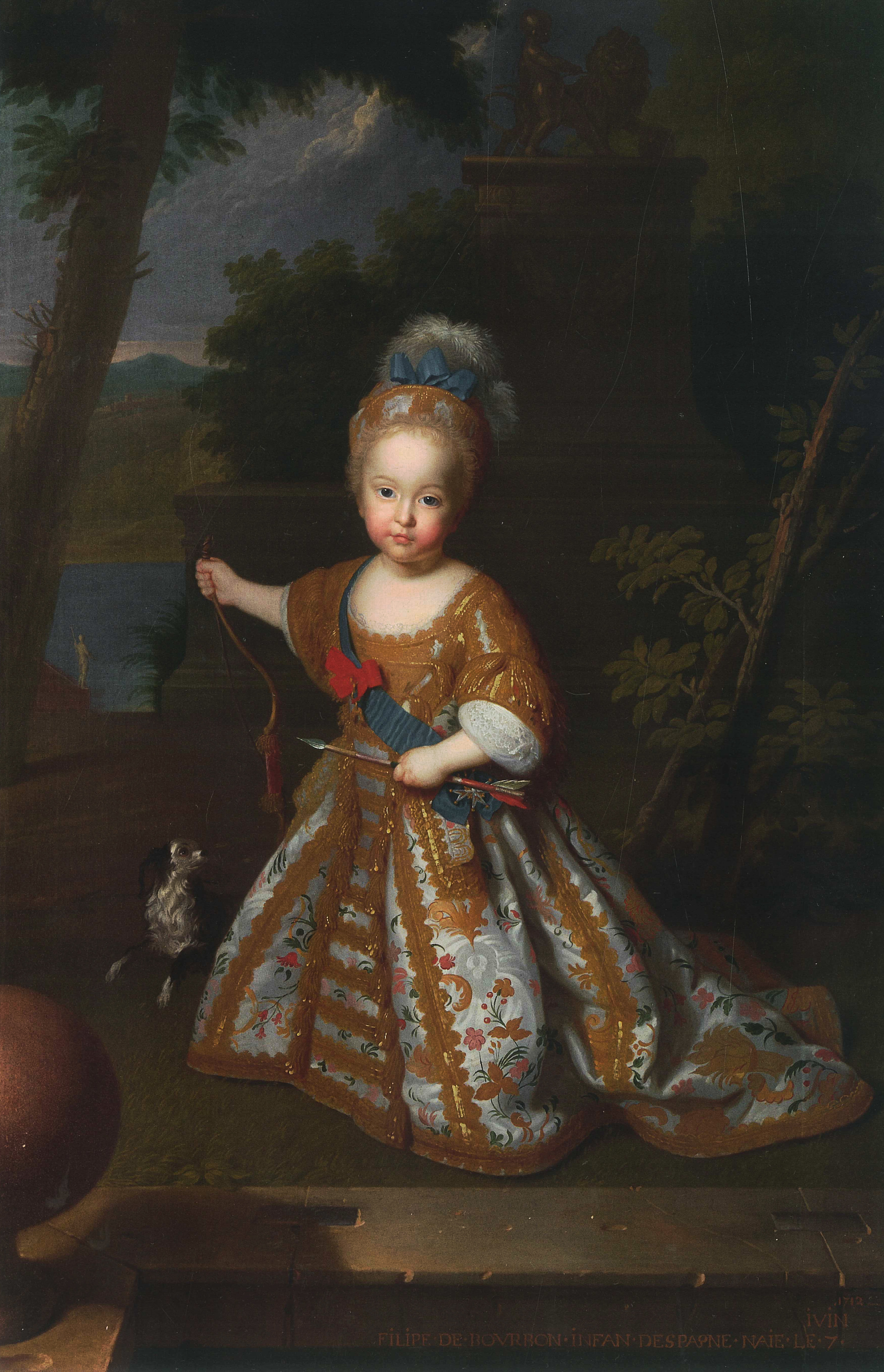
- Portrait by Michel Ange Houasse, c. 1717
- Born: 7 June 1712; El Escorial, Madrid, Spain
- Died: 29 December 1719 (aged 7); El Escorial, Madrid, Spain
- Burial: El Escorial
Names
- Spanish: Felipe Pedro Gabriel de de Borbón y Saboya
- House: Bourbon-Anjou
- Father: Philip V of Spain
- Mother: Maria Luisa of Savoy

Infante Philip Peter of Spain (Spanish: Felipe Pedro Gabriel de Borbón y Saboya; 7 June 1712 – 29 December 1719) was a Spanish infante as the third son born to King Philip V of Spain and his first queen consort, Maria Luisa of Savoy.

== Birth ==
Infante Philip Peter Gabriel was born early in the morning of 7 June 1712, at El Escorial in Madrid, the King's official residence, almost three years after the death of his elder brother and namesake, Infante Philip Peter, who had died aged sixteen days.

His mother died on 14 February 1714.

== Death ==
By Christmas Day 1719, Philip was already very sick. His father arranged for his burial a few days before his death on 29 December 1719. Philip was buried in El Escorial complex.
