= List of historic properties in Nogales, Arizona =

- City
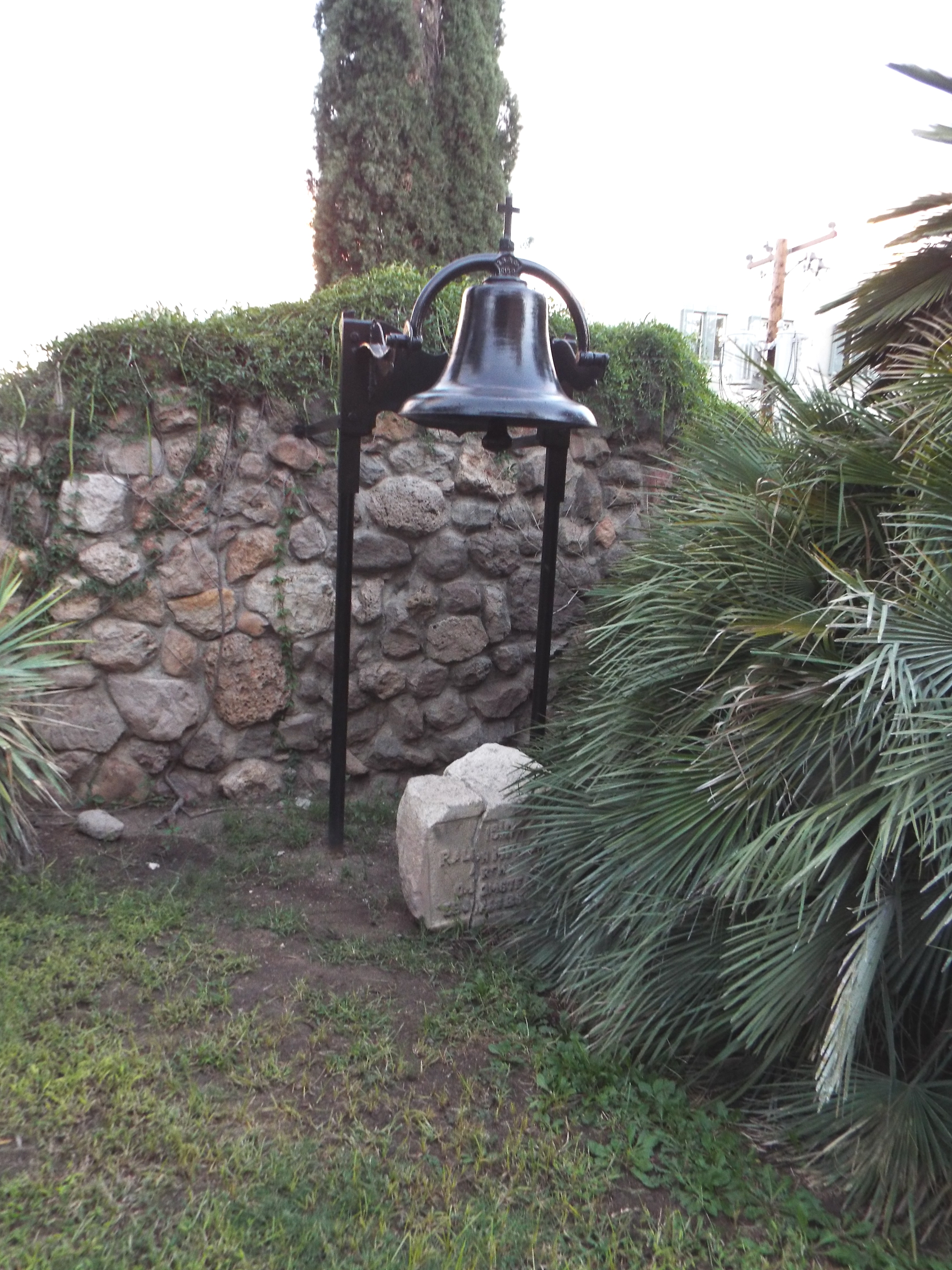
- 1910 Sacred Heart Church Bell

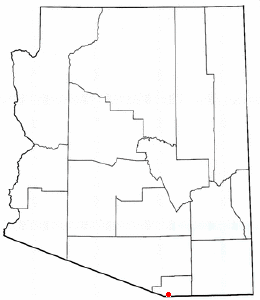
- Location of Nogales in Santa Cruz County, Arizona.

This is a list which includes a photographic gallery, of some of the structures of historic significance in Nogales, Arizona. Nogales is a city in Santa Cruz County, Arizona which lies on the border of Mexico and is separated from the town of Nogales, Sonora in Mexico by a 20-foot-high row of steel beams, also known simply as the "Wall". Nicknamed the "Gateway to Mexico" the two cities share a rich history that dates back thousands of years ago when ancient native people's trade routes went through the combined area.

== Brief history ==
The area where Nogales is located was inhabited by the Anasazi, an early Native-American tribe. The waters provided by the Santa Cruz River, Sonoita Creek and Harshaw Creek were ideal for fishing. The land was also ideal for agriculture and ranching. Ruins of the ancient settlements and petroglyphs of the Anasazi have been found by archaeologists. The region was later inhabited by the Hohokam, Apache and Yaqui tribes who built their communities along the river and creeks.

In 1539, Spanish explorer Fray Marcos de Niza entered the area near Lochiel on the Mexican border. He continued on his journey to Zuni Pueblo, New Mexico also known as the Seven Cities of Cibola. Marcos de Niza is credited with being the first European in what is now the State of Arizona. The prehistoric migratory route used by the ancient Indians was later named "El Camino Real" which is Spanish for "The King's Highway". The main Native-American tribes in the area at that time were the Sobaipuri and Papago tribes.

In 1692, Father Eusebio Francisco Kino came to the area as a missionary. His main objective was to convert the natives to Catholicism. The area became part of his "La Mission en Guevavi". For the next two decades, he traveled through Southern Arizona spreading the Catholic faith and teaching the native people how to farm. Groves of walnut trees at one time covered the mountain pass that bridged the areas where the present-day Nogales, Arizona and Nogales, Sonora, Mexico are located. The name of Nogales means "black walnut" in Spanish.

The mission period was ended in 1768 by a decree of Charles III of Spain. In 1821, the Mexican War of Independence between Mexico and Spain came to an end and the territory of New Spain, which included Arizona, was ceded to Mexico.

== American settlers ==
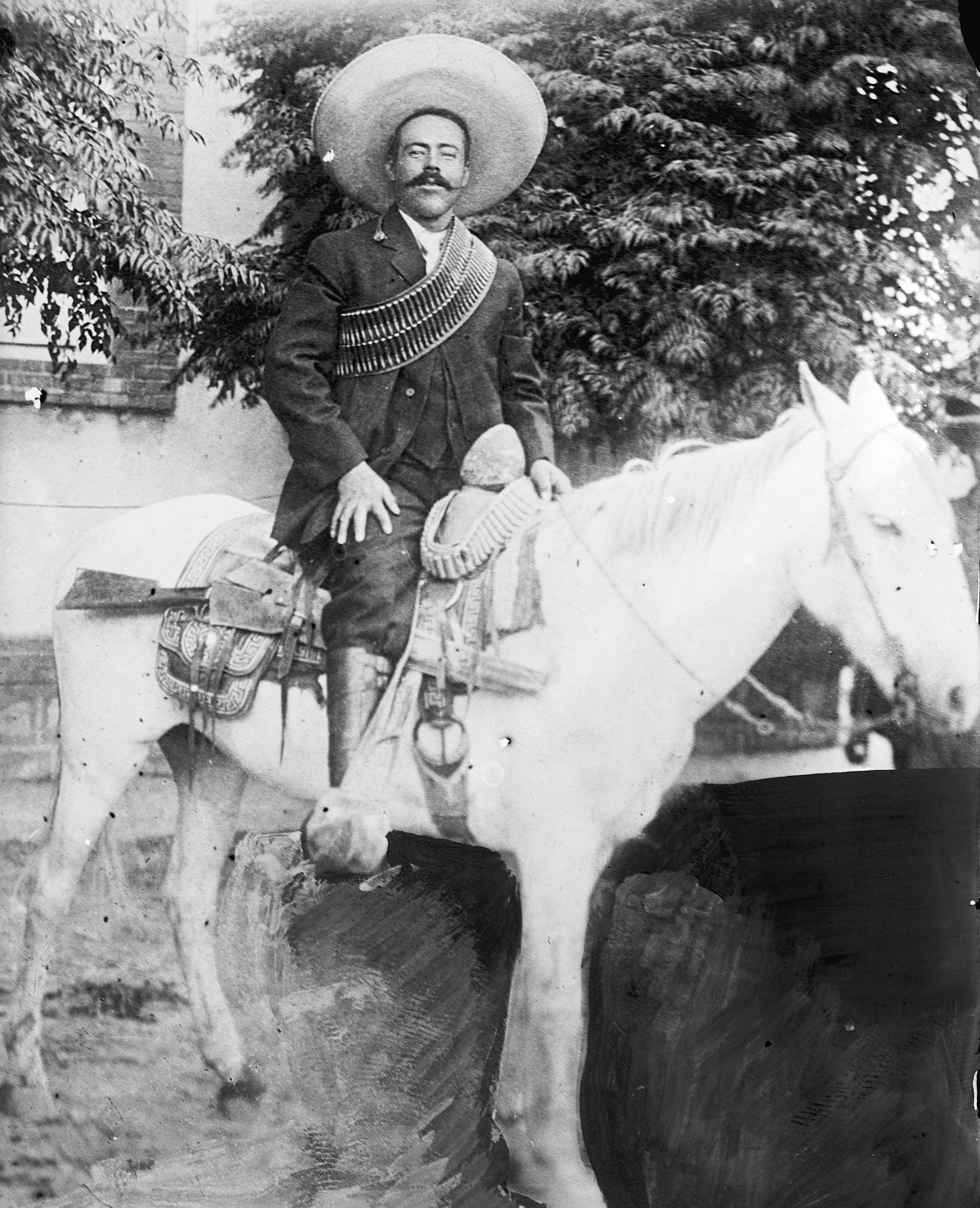
Francisco "Pancho" Villa

In 1854, the United States purchased the region from Mexico in what is known as the Gadsden Purchase. Anglo-Americans of European descent from the East Coast of the United States began to arrive in the area. The vast Spanish land grants that had been established were broken up as settlers from the east moved west to homestead and ranch. The new settlers were protected from the constant attacks of the Apaches by the United States Military. However, The majority of the troops were withdrawn from the area upon the outbreak of the American Civil War. Fort Buchanan, which was actually a small garrison established in 1856 near Sonoita, was overrun by the Apaches. Thus, the miners, ranchers and farmers in the region were without protection from the Apaches and many of them moved to other areas. The Civil War between the North (the Union) and the South (the Confederacy) ended in 1865.

In 1867, the United States Army established a military post called Camp Crittenden close to Sonoita. The camp, which later was renamed Fort Crittenden, was involved in a campaign against the Apache with the intention of protecting the American pioneers in the area. The miners, ranchers and farmers returned to the area once more.

== The border "Wall" ==
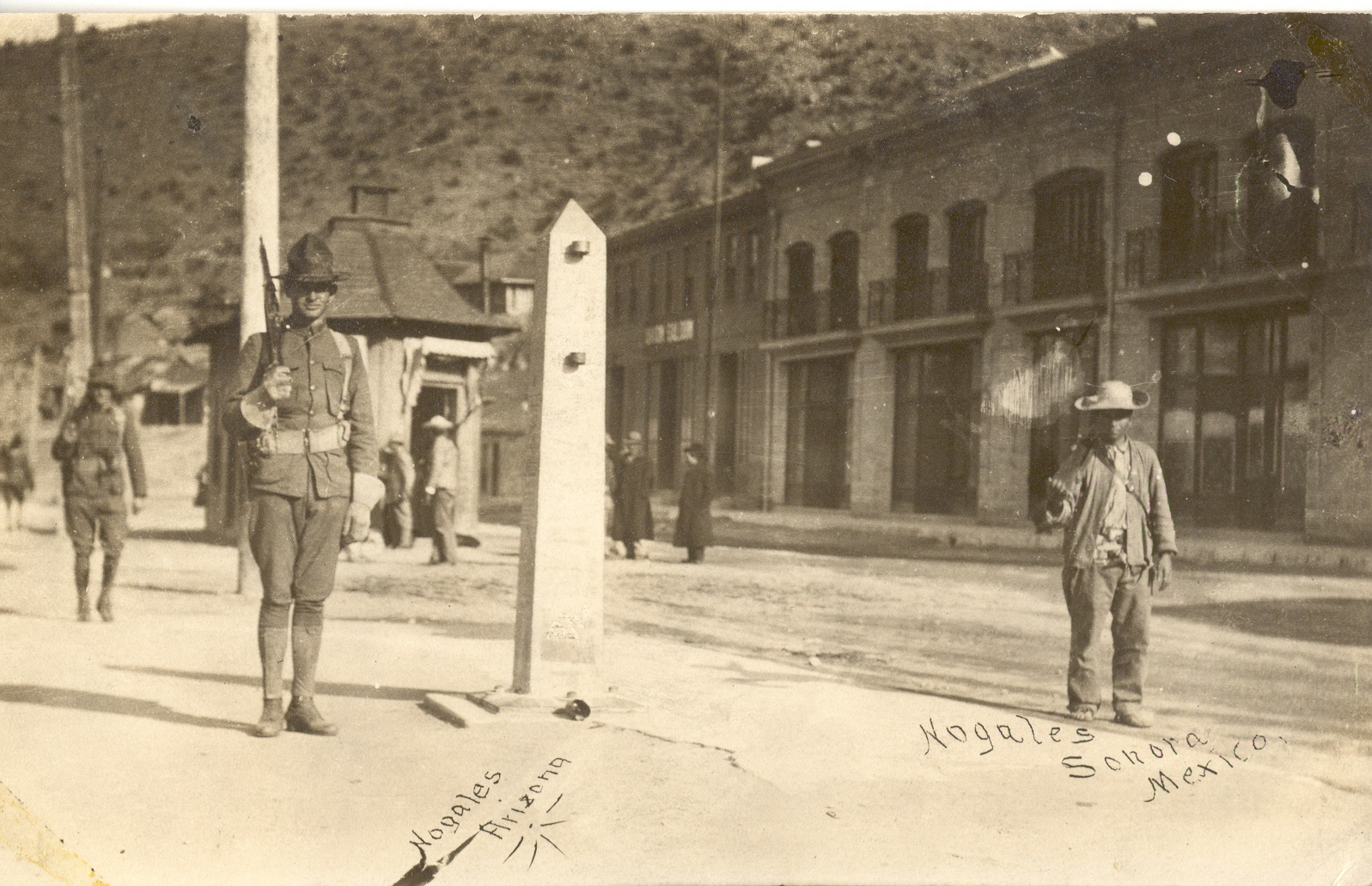
American and Mexican soldiers guarding International Street in Ambos Nogales. The obelisk in the center is a border marker, which still stands.

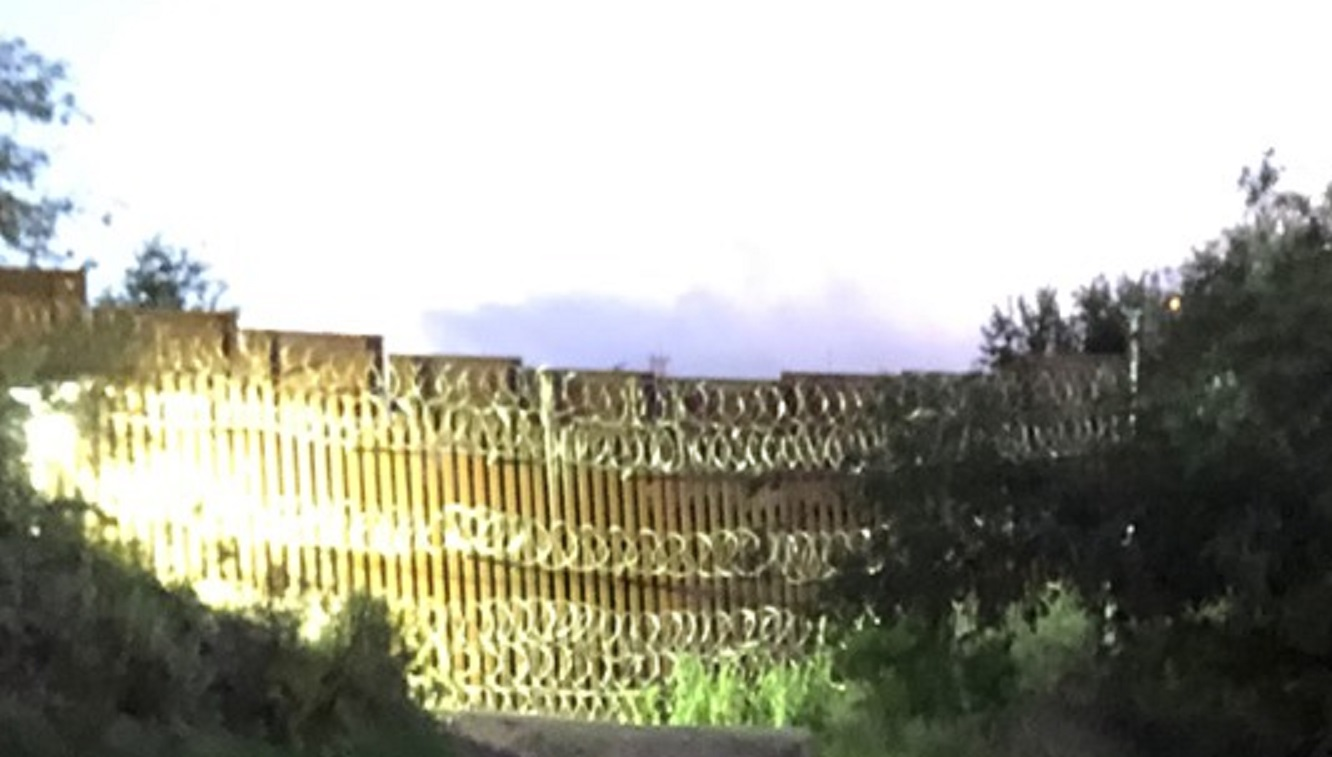
The Border Wall in Nogales, Az. during the night

Tensions along the border started to rise with the Mexican Revolution which began in 1910. However, the Nogales area within the United States border had a military garrison of ten thousand men made up mostly of African Americans soldiers from the 25th Regiment. The military buildup and related business growth attracted many businesses to Nogales, some of which remain today. In 1913, there was a violent battle between the Mexican Forces and Pancho Villa and his men in Nogales, Sonora. Villa and his men were victorious and occupied the area. In 1915 a second battle took place, this time Villa's men fired across the border line into the United States. U.S. cavalrymen crossed the border into Mexican territory and engaged Villa's troops.

Another situation which caused tensions to rise between the U. S. and Mexico was that Germany began to encourage Mexico to declare war on the United States and take back its former territories during World War I. Thus, the United States kept a keen observation on the border to make sure that smugglers would not supply Mexico with guns and that refugees fleeing to the United States did not belong to an international espionage team backed by the Germans.

The first border fence between the two nations was built between 1909 and 1911. They were actually a barbed wire fence installed by the U.S. government on the border to prevent cattle from wandering between the countries. Felix B. Peñaloza, the "Presidente Municipal" (which in Mexico is the term used for the word Mayor) of Nogales, Mexico, ordered construction of a fence running along the boundary line between his city and Nogales, Arizona. The fence in Nogales was built by Mexican workers. A metal obelisk marked the international border in both Nogales. American and Mexican sentries patrolled the line.

A firefight broke out between the American and Mexican sides of the fence when on August 27, 1918, an unidentified man tried to cross over to the Mexican side and refused to halt when ordered by a U.S. customs inspector. Both sides began to shoot at each other and at the end of the incident, which is known as the Battle of Ambos Nogales, 12 Mexicans and Americans were killed, including Mayor Peñaloza. Today, the fence is now a 20-foot-high row of steel beams, recently reinforced with razor wire.

== Pimeria Alta Historical Society and Museum ==
According to the website of the Pimeria Alta Historical Society and Museum, Housed in the Old Nogales City Hall, constructed in 1914, the museum provides information on the history of the Pimeria Alta and welcomes visitors to the border area. The society was formed in 1948, when a group of 28 concerned citizens got together to preserve the rich and exciting history of the area. The city of Nogales, Arizona was incorporated in 1893.

The fact that a property is listed in the National Register of Historic Places does not mean that the property is safe from being demolished by its owner. According to Jim McPherson, Arizona Preservation Foundation Board President:

"It is crucial that residents, private interests, and government officials act now to save these elements of our cultural heritage before it is too late."

The city has three historic districts and various individual properties listed in the National Register of Historic Places

== Properties pictured ==
=== Districts ===
According to the National Trust for Historic Preservation: "a local historic district is an entire area or group of historic structures deemed significant to the city's cultural fabric that are protected by public review. This can include downtown commercial areas, main streets, waterfront districts, and residential districts." The following Districts are pictured and/or have images related to them:

- The Crawford Hill Historic Residential District – Roughly bounded by Oak St., Terrace Ave., Compound St., and Interstate 19 and Grindell Ave. The Nogales Crawford Hill Historic Residential District was built on the slopes west of the arroyo dividing Nogales. It became the most substantial residential district in the city and has representative buildings from all periods of Nogales' history. The district includes 216 buildings. The district was listed in the National Register of Historic Places on August 29, 1985, reference: #85001874.
- The Marsh Heights Historic District – Roughly Bounded by Court Street, Summit Avenue, South Court Street, and Morley Avenue. The Marsh Heights Historic District was developed by prominent Nogales businessman and land developer, George F. Marsh. It was platted in 1905, and developed in 1909. The neighborhood is organized around a hilltop central square. The district was listed in the National Register of Historic Places on October 29, 1985, reference: #85003407.
- The Pennington Rural Historic Landscape (not pictured) – Located at Junction of Royal Road and Calle del Rio Nogales. This National Register District conveys a pristine sense of Anglo-American pioneer agriculture and represents a cohesive rural historic landscape in southern Arizona after the acquisition of the area from Mexico. It includes a stone cabin, a field, an irrigation ditch, and an adobe ruin. The stone cabin is thought to be the oldest remaining house built by Anglo-Americans in Arizona. The field has been farmed almost continuously since 1858. The field is thought to have been irrigated by diverting the water from the Santa Cruz River into the ditch, which is no longer there, but that could be traced. The adobe ruin is thought to mark the former house of Albert Case Benedict, who was the third owner of the Pennington property. The property is associated with Elias Green Pennington, who was one of the first farmers along the upper Santa Cruz River, and his daughter, Larcena. The area was listed in the National Register of Historic Places on February 10, 2000, reference: #00000004.
Historic Districts
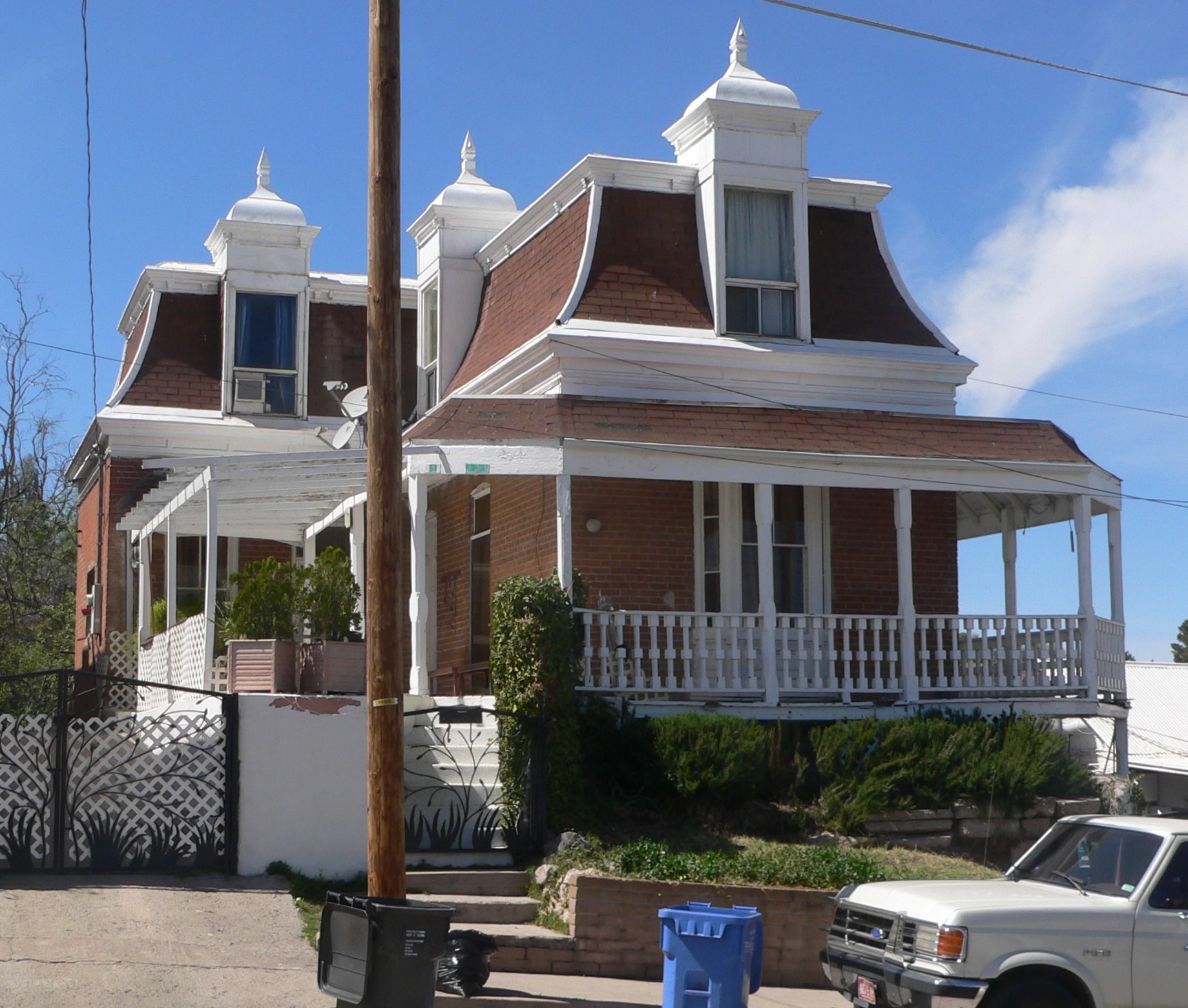
Crawford Hill Historic Residential District

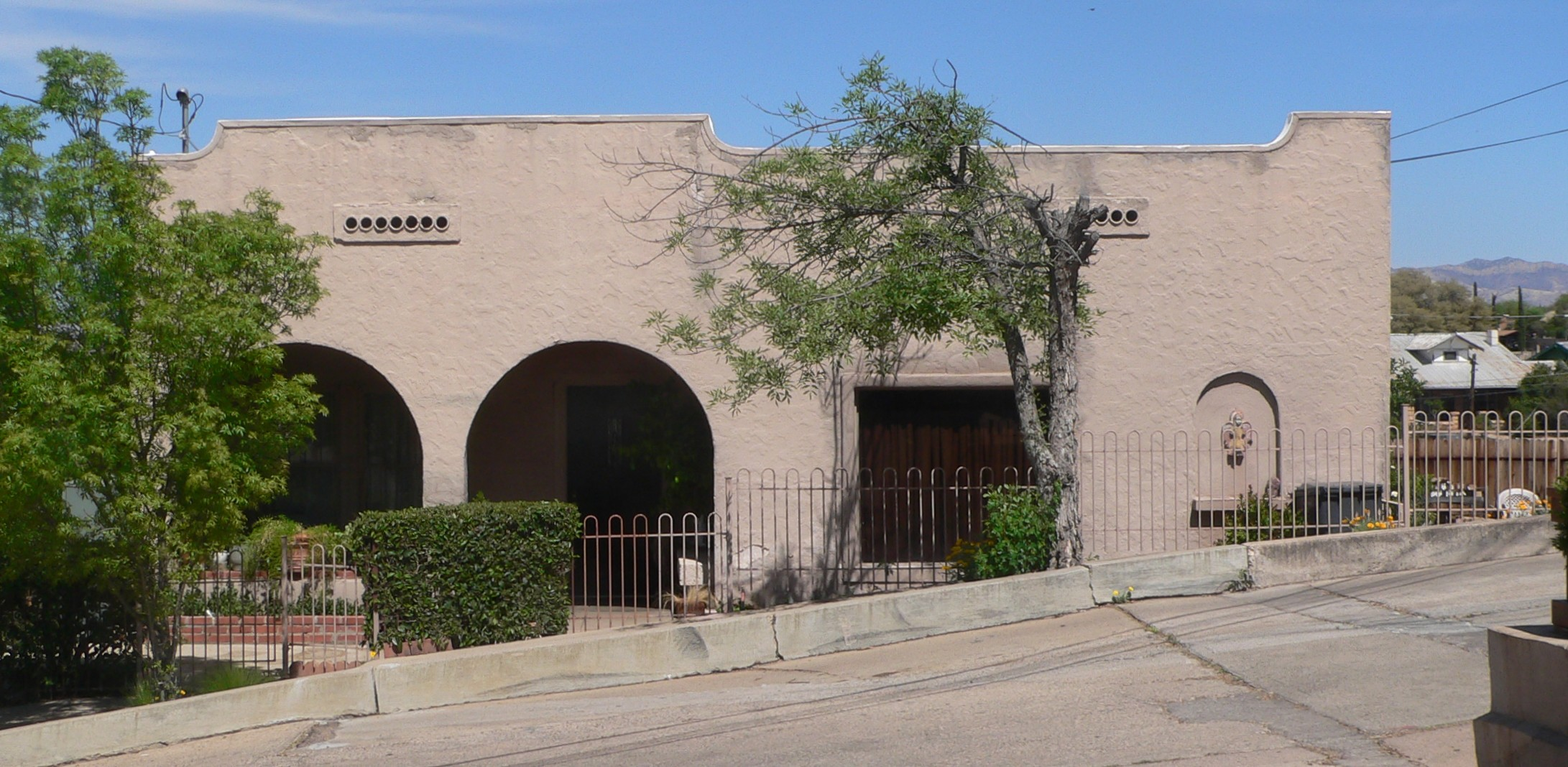
Marsh Heights Historic District

=== Buildings ===
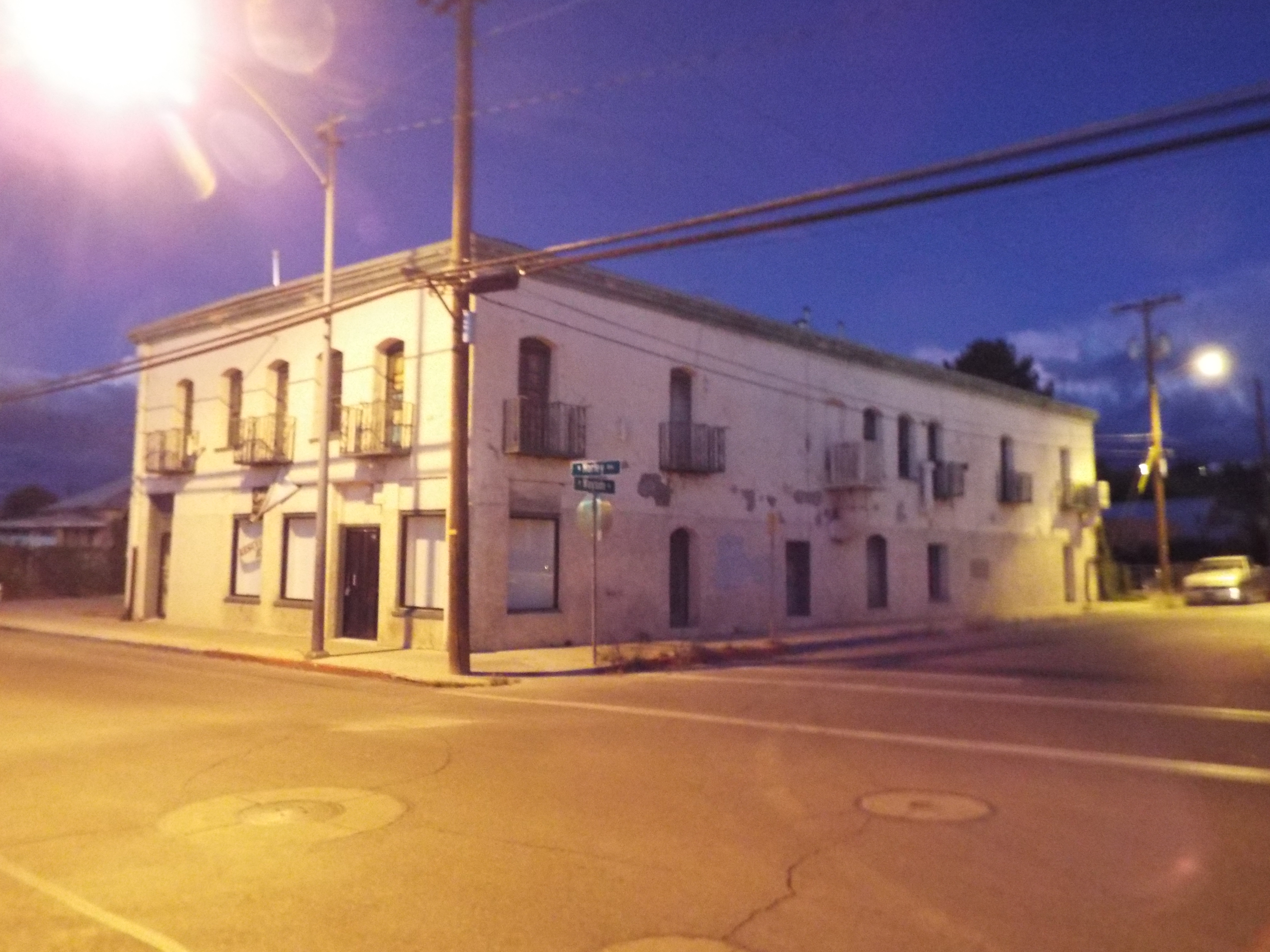
Hotel Blanca (1917)

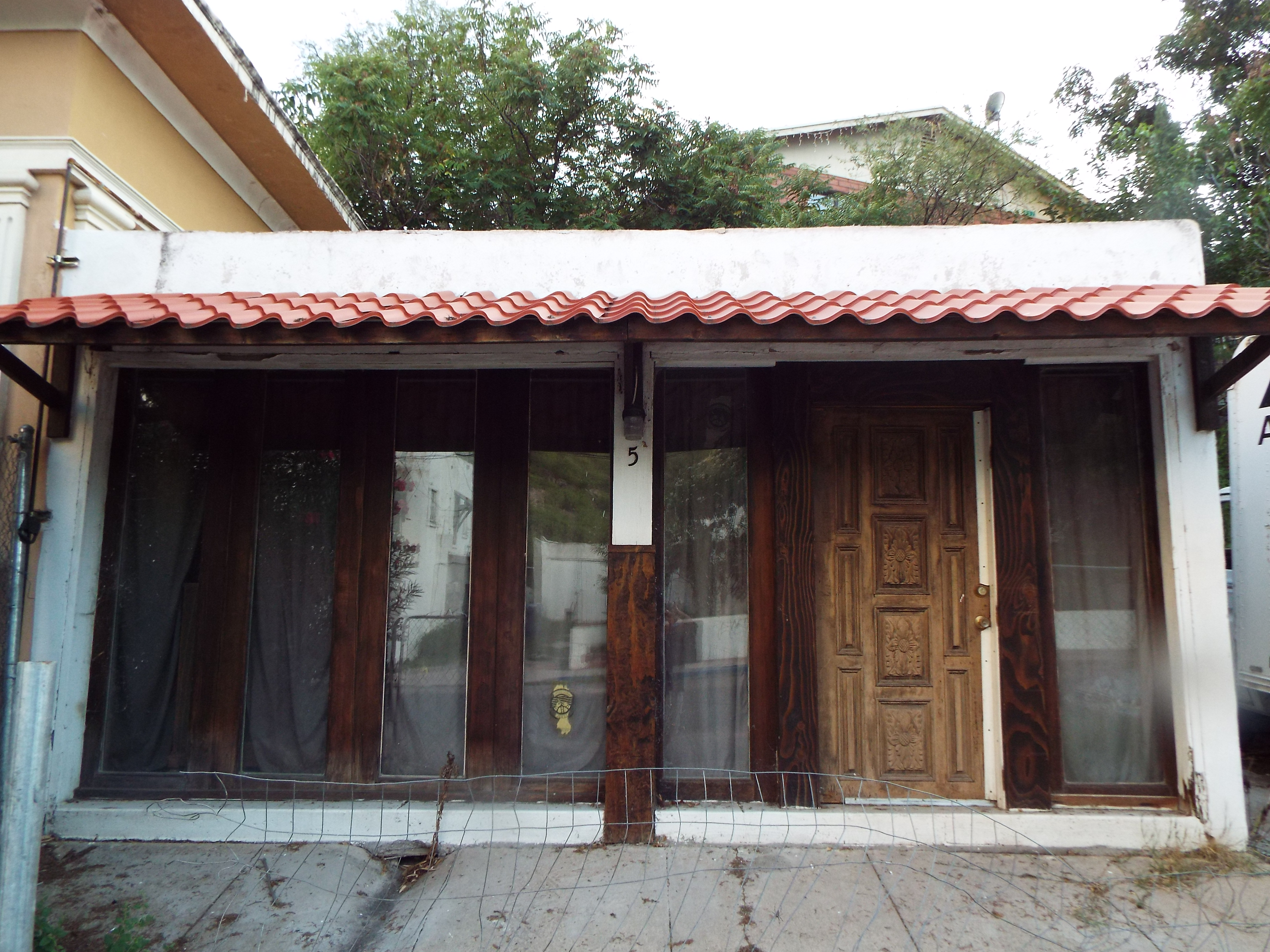
Building on 465 Walnut Street (1900)

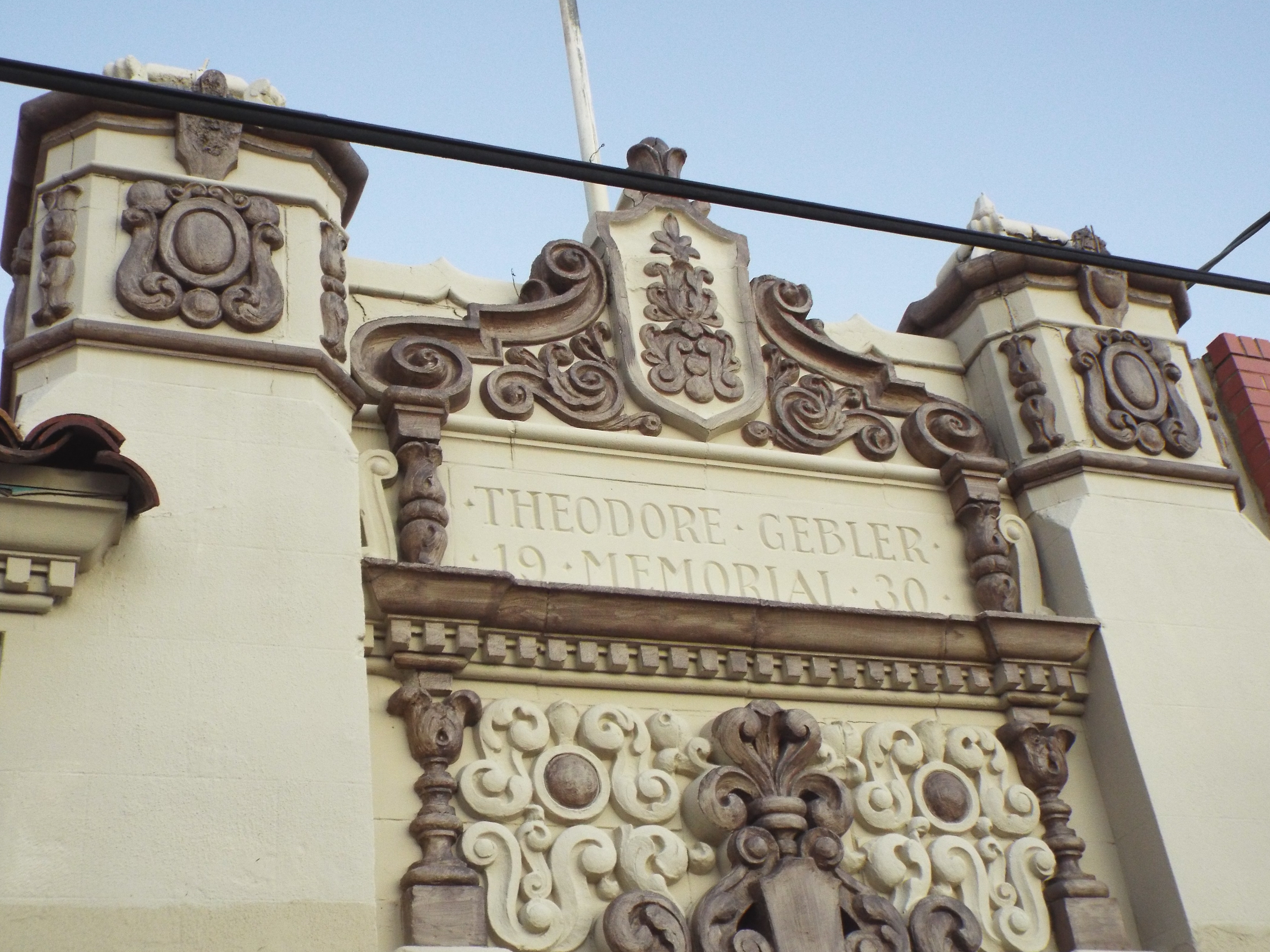
Theodore Gebler Memorial Building (1930)

The following is a brief description of some of the pictured buildings which are listed in the National Register of Historic Places.

- Arizona-Sonora Manufacturing Company Machine Shop – built in 1901 and located on the corner of Grand Ave. and Arroyo Boulevard. This shop is the oldest industrial building in Nogales. It is the only structure remaining that was associated with the firm of Roy & Titcomb, Inc., majority owners of the Arizona and Sonora Manufacturing Company and largest employers in Nogales between 1900 and 1920. It was listed in the National Register of Historic Places on August 29, 1985, reference: #85001851.
- J.E. Wise Building – built in 1918 and located at 87 North Grand Avenue. This building houses the oldest continually operated newspaper and printing establishment in Nogales. Since 1918, it has been associated with the Nogales Herald, whose publisher, Hanson Ray Sisk, published the paper (1920–1969) longer than any other publisher in the state. It was listed in the National Register of Historic Places on August 29, 1985, reference: #85001869.
- Old Nogales City Hall and Fire Station – built in 1914 and located at 136 Grand Avenue. The Pimería Alta Historical Society currently uses the first floor and basement as a museum and research library. It was listed in the National Register of Historic Places on April 3, 1980, reference: #80000772.
- George B. Marsh Building – built in 1905 and located at 142–154 Grand Avenue. This building is located next to the Pimería Alta Historical Society. It is significant in its association with one of the most prominent early businessmen in Nogales, George Marsh. The original portion of the building housed the Nogales post office from 1905 to 1926. In 1908, it housed the Nogales telephone exchange, and in 1914, the Marsh furniture store. It was listed in the National Register of Historic Places on August 29, 1985, reference: #85001855.
- A.S. Noon Building – built in 1900 and located at 185 Grand Avenue. This building was built by A. S. Noon and is associated with the prominent early pioneer Noon family, who did much to shape the city of Nogales—economically, politically, and socially—through all its historic periods. The northern half of the building once served as a storeroom occupied by Wing Wong, a longtime leading Chinese merchant. It was listed in the National Register of Historic Places on August 29, 1985, reference: #85001871.
- The Bowman Hotel – built in 1917 and located 245 Grand Avenue. The Bowman Hotel is the oldest remaining hotel building in Nogales. It is associated with Wirt G. Bowman, a prominent early Nogales businessman and a state and national politician. It was listed in the National Register of Historic Places on August 29, 1985, reference: #85001852.
- Burton Building (Ed Burton & Son Building) – built in 1916 and located at 253 Grand Avenue Nogales. The Burton Building is one of three remaining hotel buildings built in Nogales by prominent contractor, Edward Burton. The hotel played an important part in the commercial development of Grand Avenue. It was listed in the National Register of Historic Places on August 29, 1985, reference: #85001848.
- Nogales Electric Light, Ice & Water Company Power House – built in 1915 and located at 491 Grand Avenue. This is the only remaining building associated with development of electric power in Nogales during the growth of the city. It was listed in the National Register of Historic Places on August 29, 1985, reference: #85001865.
- S.H. Kress & Co. Building – built in 1924 and located on 48 N. Morley Avenue. The building's stylized "Kress" on its pedimented parapet identifies its original use as part of the S. H. Kress & Co. chain of "five and dime" retail department stores. It was listed in the National Register of Historic Places on August 29, 1985, reference: #85001859.
- The Montezuma Hotel built in 1926 and located at 108–120 Morley Avenue. – This building is the dominant structure along Morley Avenue and once served as the center of the economic and social life of Nogales. It was listed in the National Register of Historic Places on August 29, 1985, reference: #85001867.
- F. L. Woolworth & Co. Building, – built in 1920 and located 115–117 N Morley Avenue. This is the only Neo-Classical Revival Commercial Building in Nogales; it is also the only terra cotta façade in Nogales. It was listed in the National Register of Historic Places on August 29, 1985.
- Jose Piscorski Building – built in 1916 and located at 186–190 N Morley Avenue. Local businessman Joseph Piscorski built this building. The second floor was the location of the Nogales and Santa Cruz Board of Trade offices from 1906 to 1908; it then operated as the San Antonio House Hotel and Boarding House. The first-floor storerooms have been occupied by various businesses since its construction. It still maintains the original storefront. It was listed in the National Register of Historic Places on August 29, 1985, reference: #85001870.
- Las Dos Naciones Cigar Factory built in 1897 and located at 204 N Morley Avenue. This building is significant in its association with pioneer businessman Richard Lewis Fleisher, who founded Las Dos Naciones Cigar Company in 1897. He ran the only cigar business in the Southwest from this building until 1917. It was listed in the National Register of Historic Places on August 29, 1985, reference: #85001860.
- The Santa Cruz County Courthouse – built in 1904 and located on the intersection of Court Street/N Morley Avenue. The three-story structure is situated on a steeply sloping site at the base of the Marsh Heights Historic Residential District. It was listed in the National Register of Historic Places on December 7, 1977, reference: #77000239.
- U.S. Custom House and U.S. Inspection Office built in 1930 and located at International St. at Morley Avenue. The U.S. Inspection Office, Morley Gate is unique among the U.S. Border Inspection Stations Multiple Property Submission (MPS). This is due to the small scale of this resource, which is basically a kiosk with an attached porte-cochere. Although this resource does not fall within standard border station property types, as described in the Multiple Property Documentation Form (MPDF), the year the resource was constructed It was listed in the National Register of Historic Places on August 9, 2016, reference: #14000244.
- Hotel Blanca – built in 1917 and located at 456 Morley Avenue. It was built by Leonardo Gomez as a hotel with storerooms. It once functioned as transitional housing and a social services office, however, it is now in a state of complete abandonment. It was listed in the National Register of Historic Places on August 29, 1985, reference: #85001861.
- The U.S. Custom House – built in 1935 and located on the junction of Terrace Street/International Street. This building is prominently located at the United States/Mexico border and is associated with the United States Customs Service and the prominent federal architect, Louis A. Simon. It is symbolic of the important role of Nogales as the primary port of entry from Mexico along the Arizona border. It was listed in the National Register of Historic Places on August 6, 1987, reference: #87001344.
- The Nogales Steam Laundry Building – built in 1926 and located at 223–219 East Street. Pioneer Nogales photographer and property owner, W. J. Neuman, built this building. It was used as a steam laundry from 1915 to 1930, and is one of only four buildings remaining in Nogales that represents historic industries. It was listed in the National Register of Historic Places on August 29, 1985, reference: #85001868.
- U.S. Post Office and Immigration Station – a.k.a. Nogales Main was built in 1923 and located on the corner of Hudgin/N Morley Avenue. The Nogales Main Post Office is one of only six post offices constructed in the western region between 1920 and 1926. The structure's only ornament is at the main entrance, and consists of two slender columns supporting an entablature over which two eagles are place. It was listed in the National Register of Historic Places on December 3, 1985, reference: #85003107.
- The Theodore Gebler Memorial Building – built in 1930 and located at 78 Terrace Avenue. Theodore Gebler at the age of 48 settled in Nogales with his family. He opened a hardware store, and eventually served as Director of First National Bank. In 1926, he set aside funds in his will for the construction of the building which was named after him, on Grand Avenue to provide for the needy of Santa Cruz County in perpetuity. The trust, known as Associated Charities, is still in existence today.
- The Elks Lodge Building (BPO6) – built in 1930 and located at 161 n Arroyo Blvd. The building was the headquarters of Elks Lodge #1397. It now houses the Amigos Wholesale.
Historic buildings

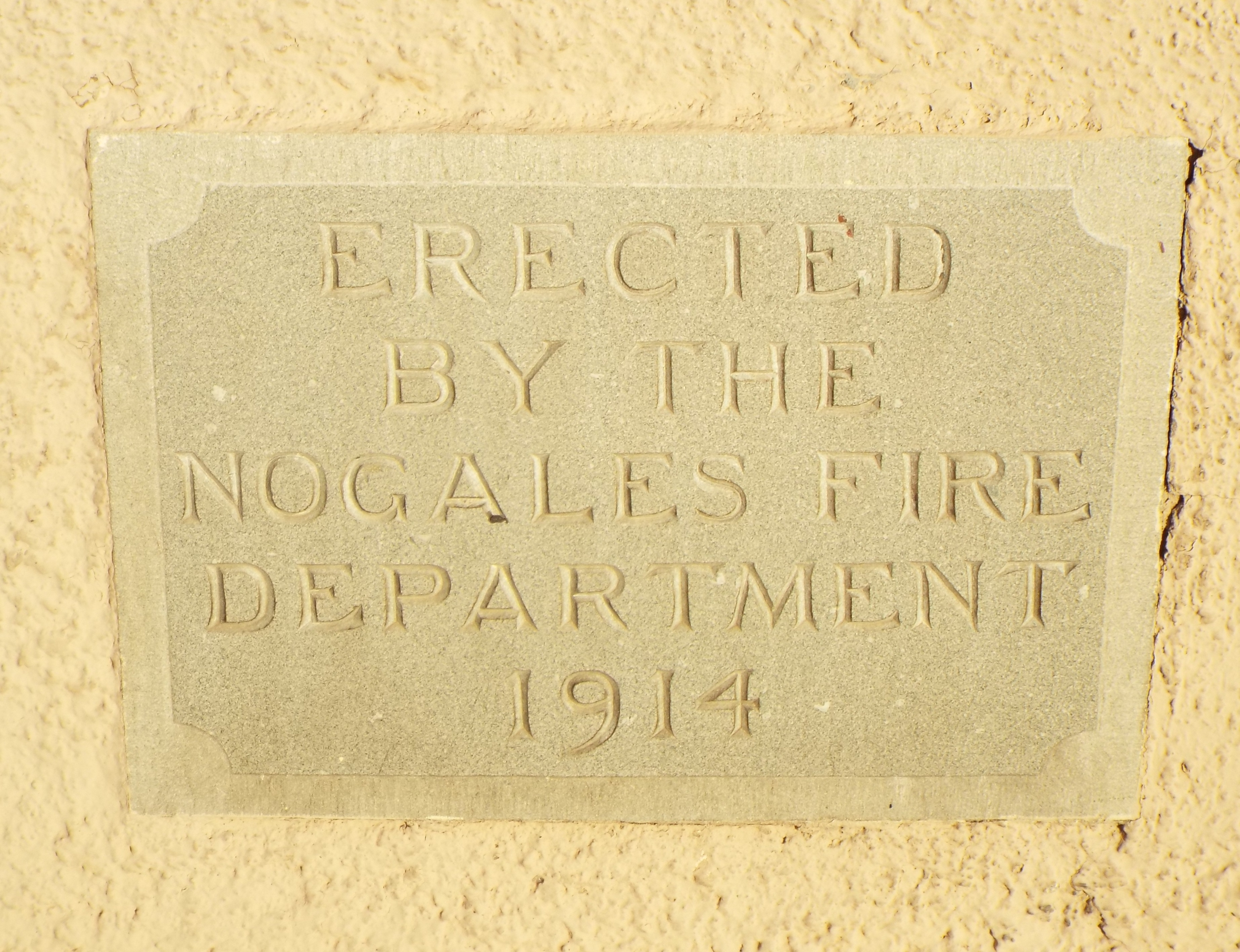
Old Nogales City Hall and Fire Station corner stone

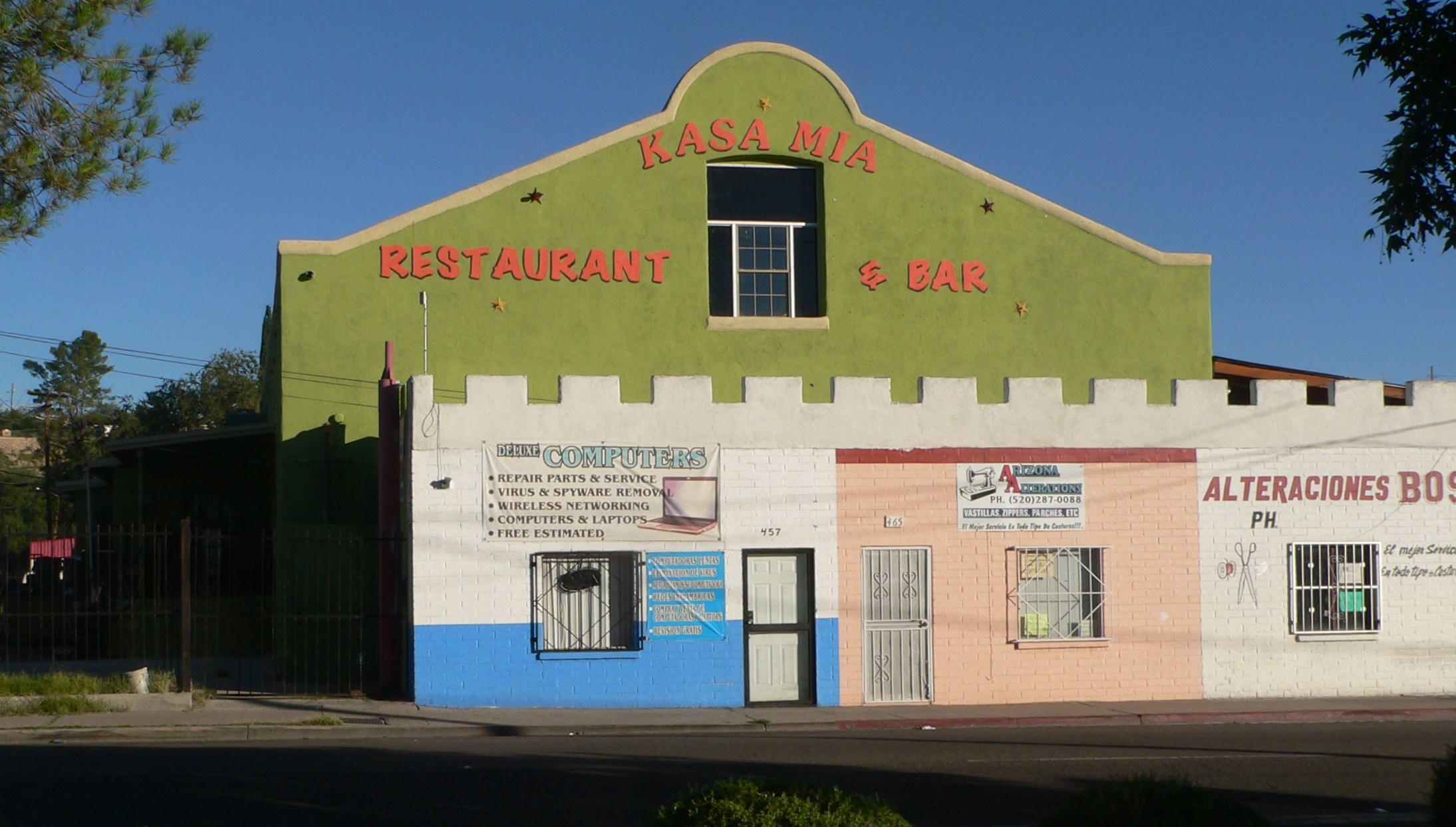
Arizona-Sonora Manufacturing Company Machine Shop

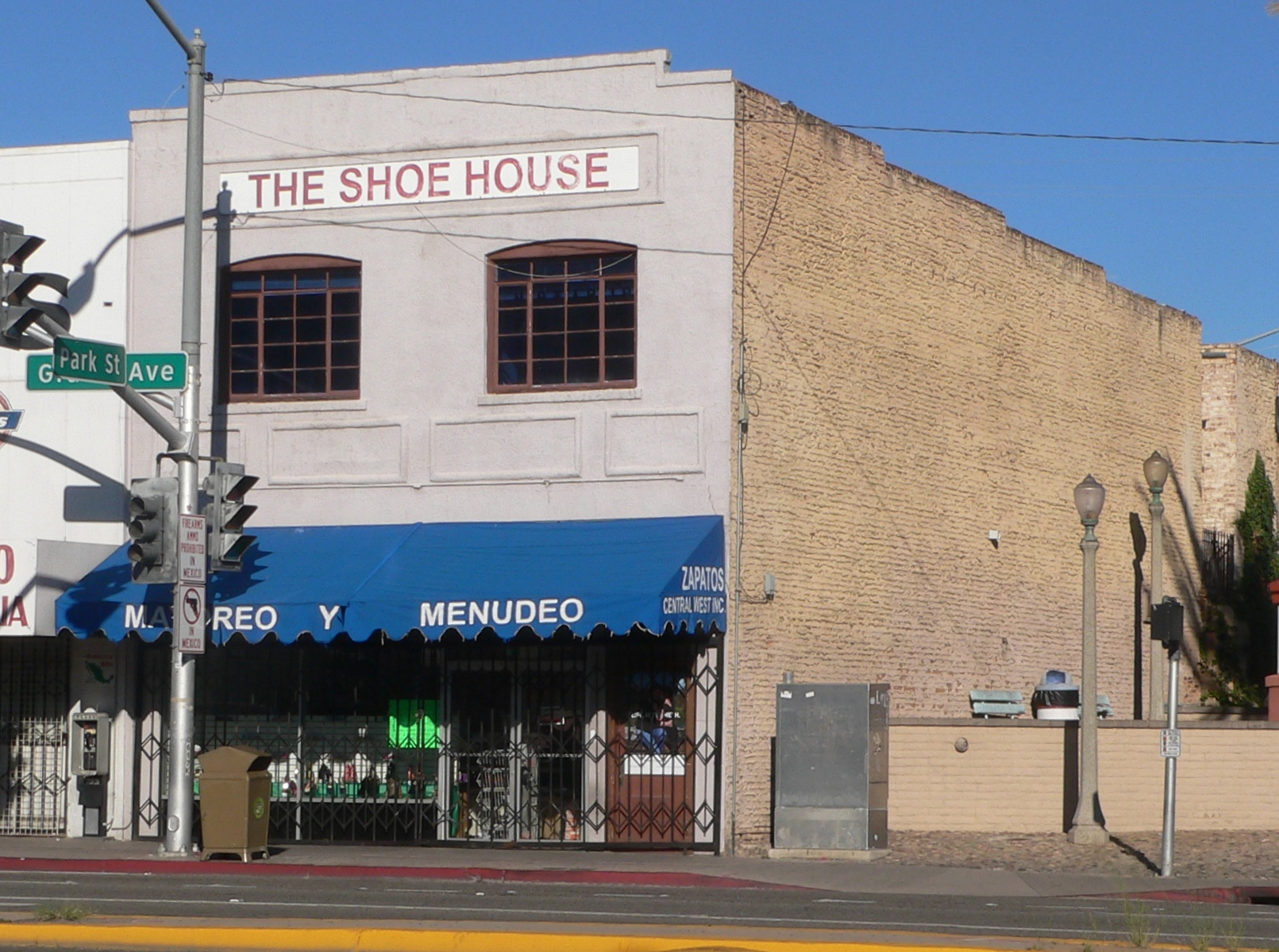
J.E. Wise Building

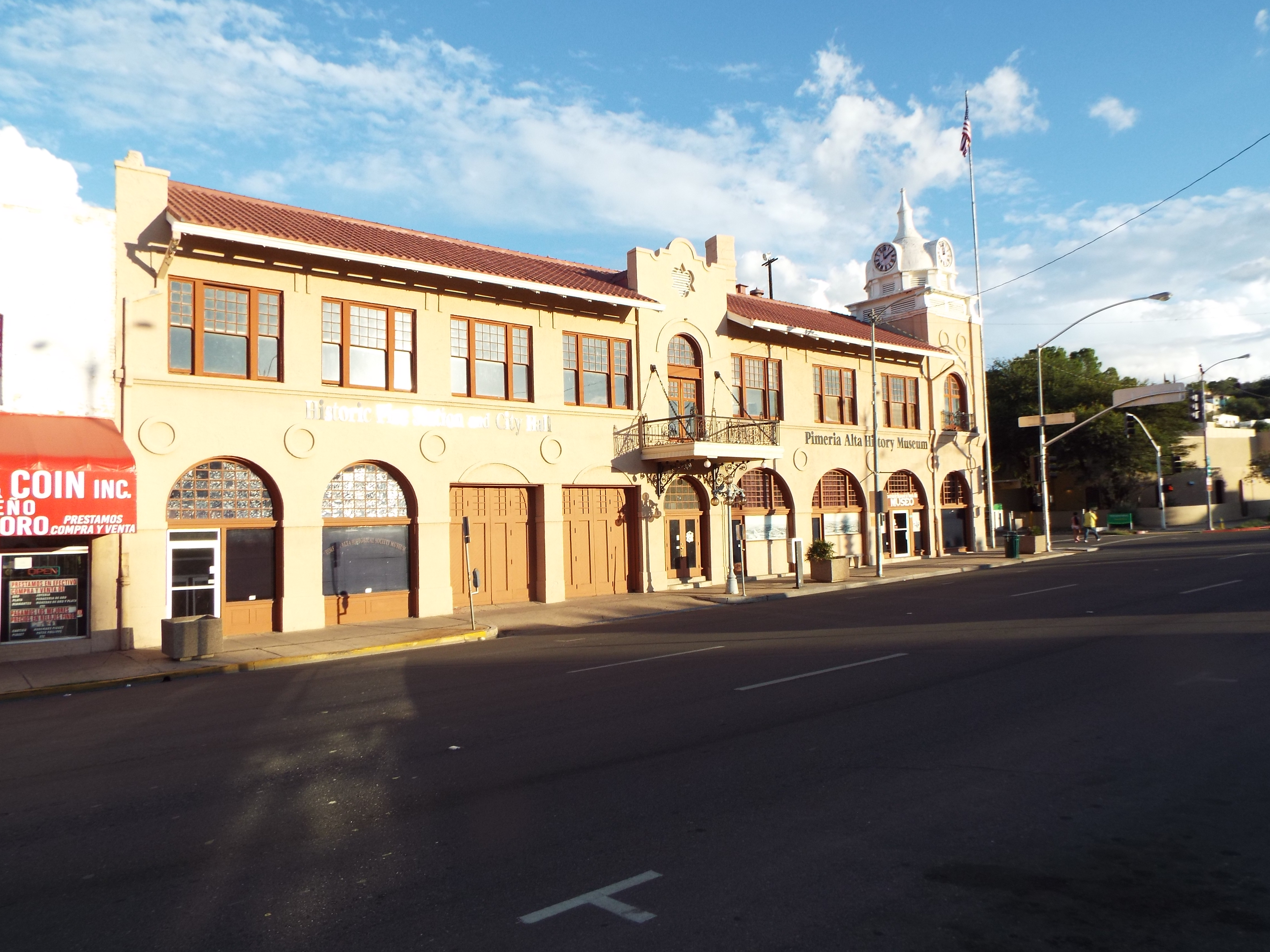
Old Nogales City Hall and Fire Station

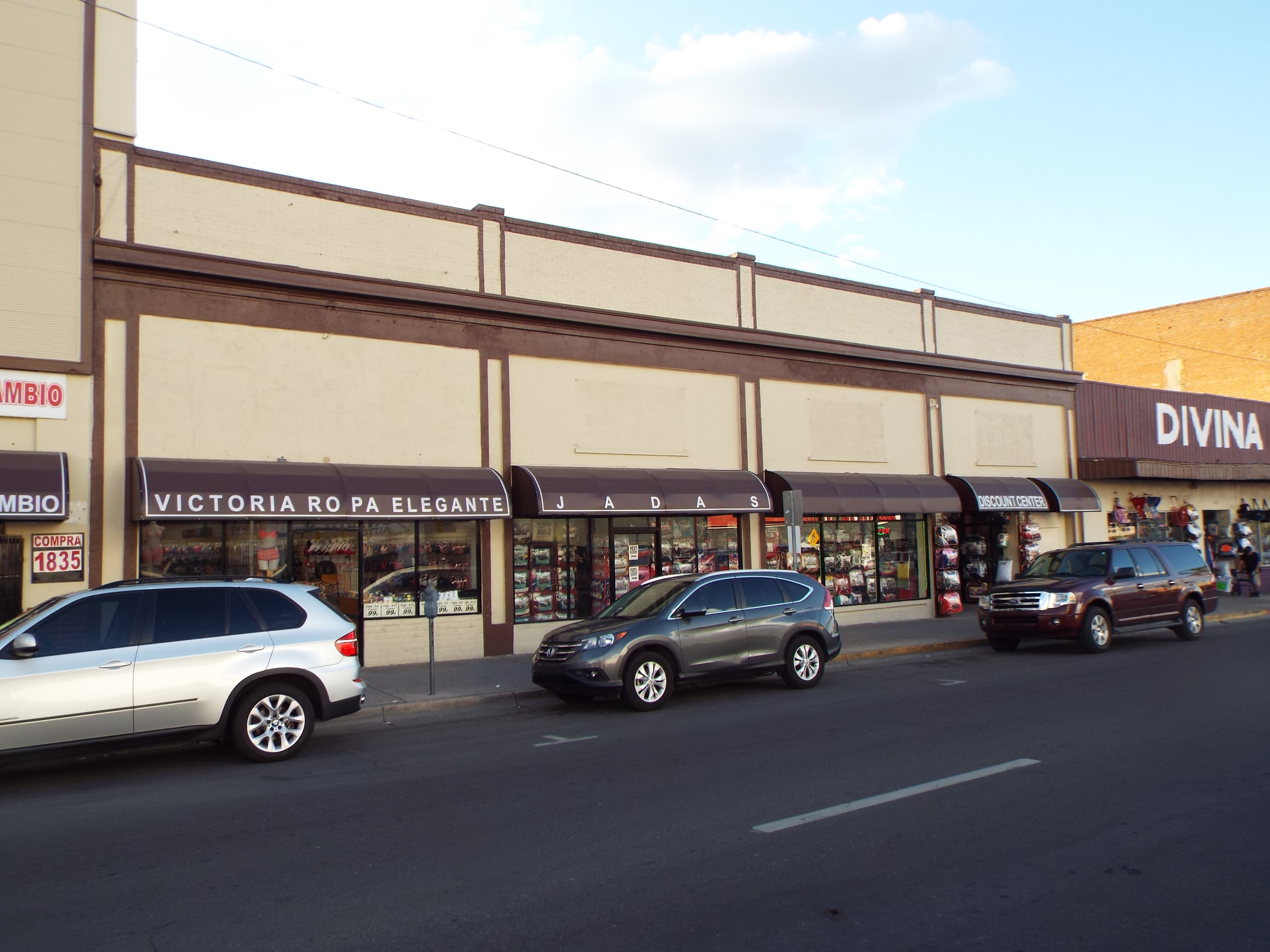
George B. Marsh Building

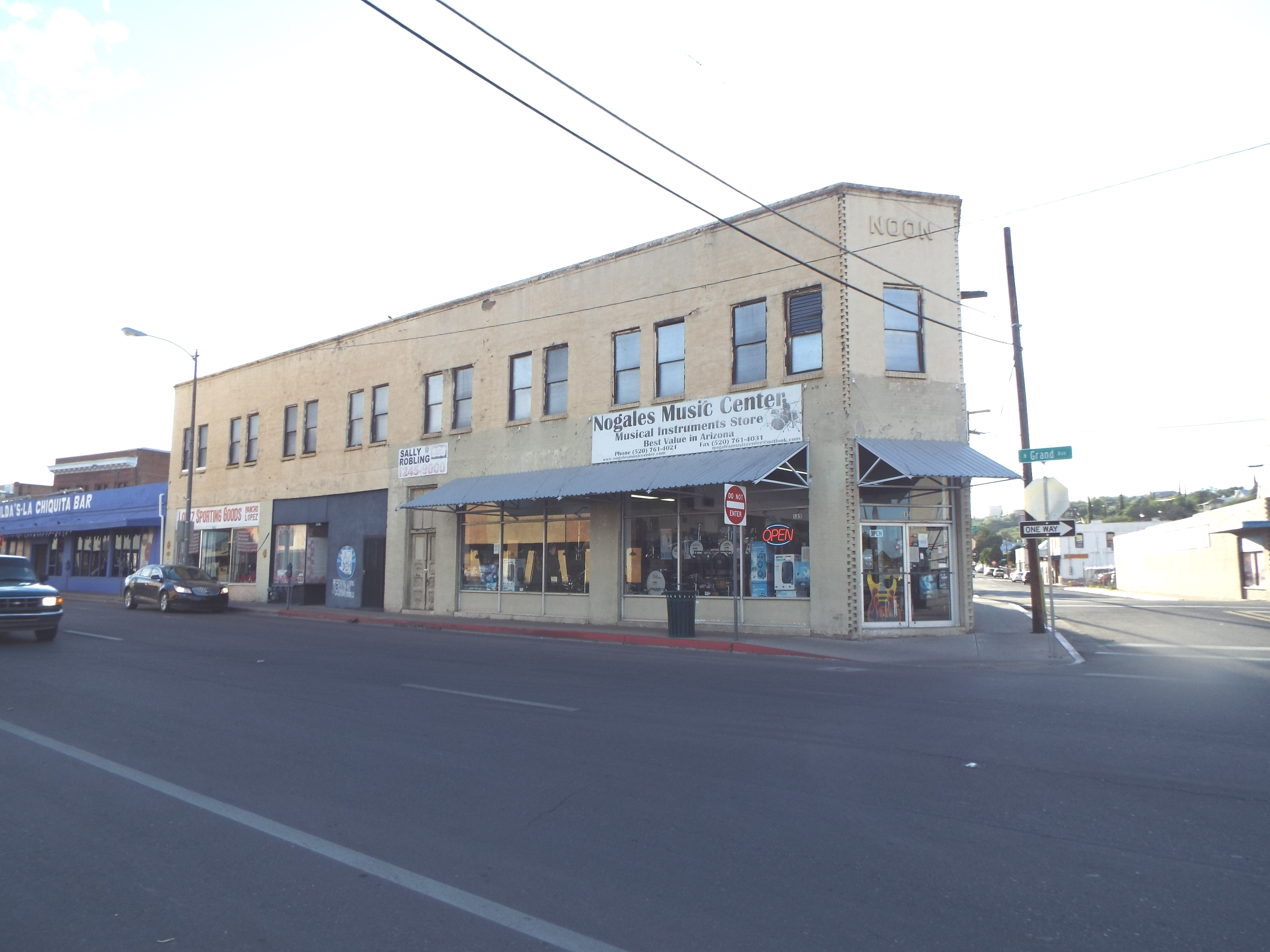
A.S. Noon Building

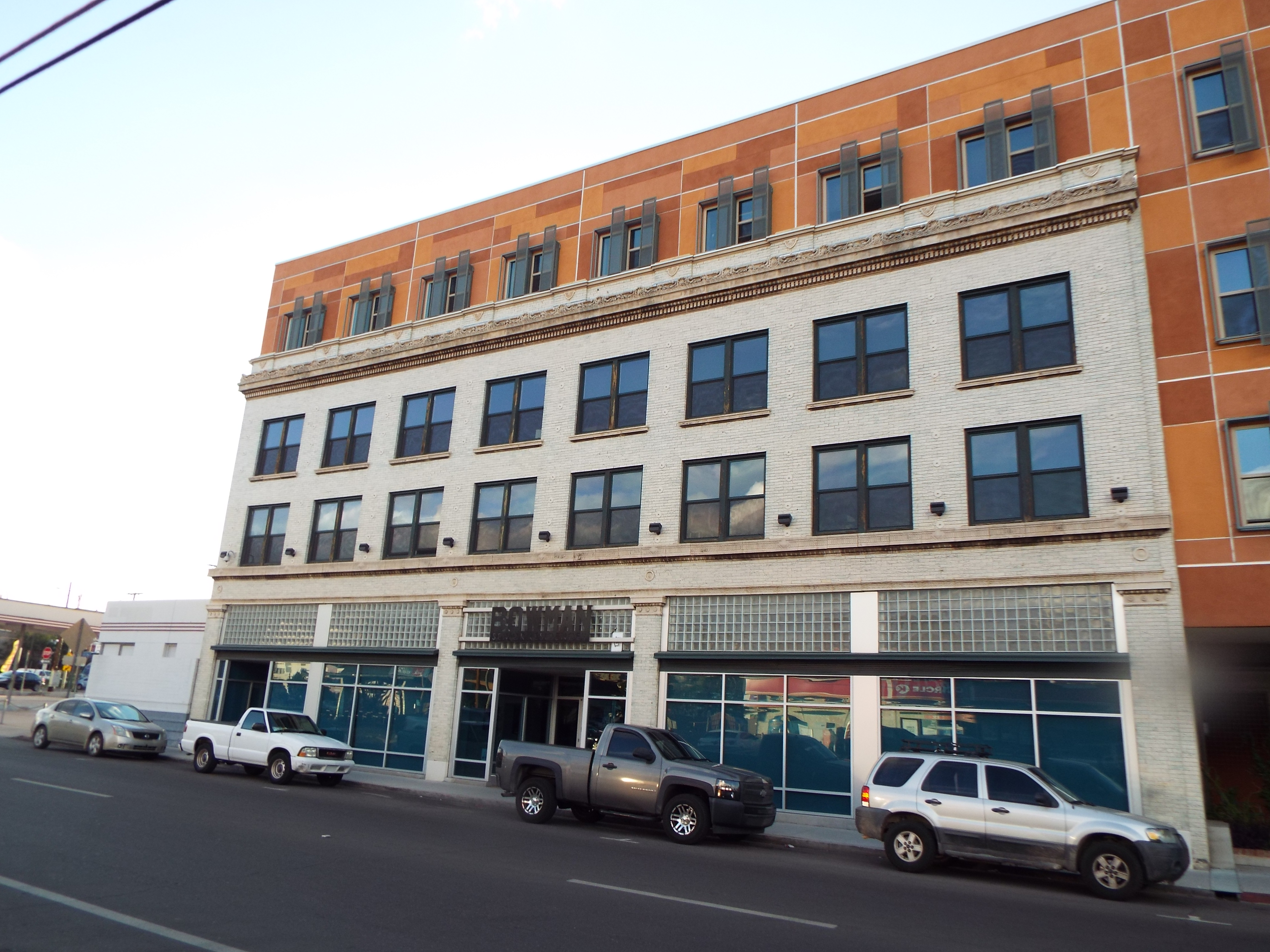
Bowman Hotel

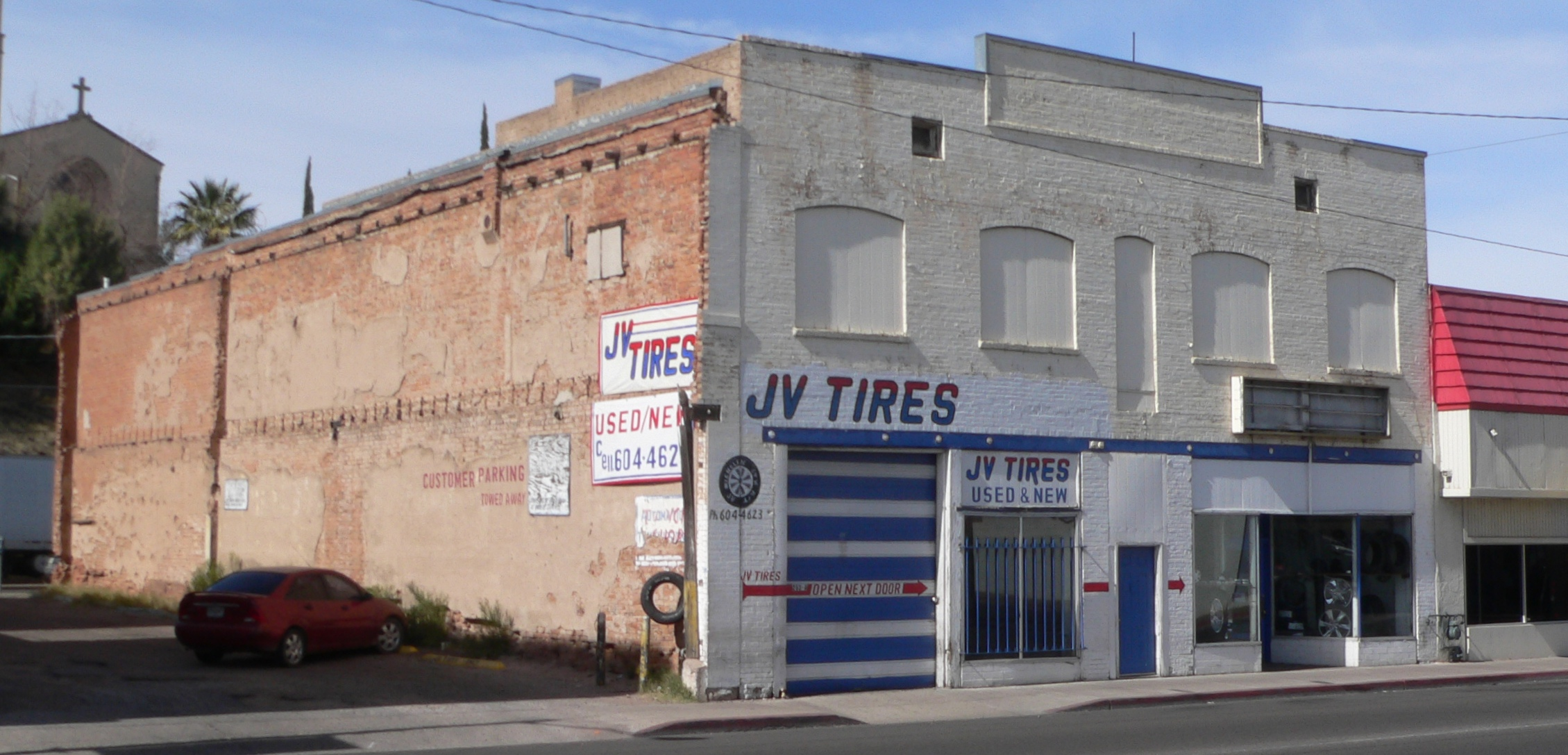
Burton Building

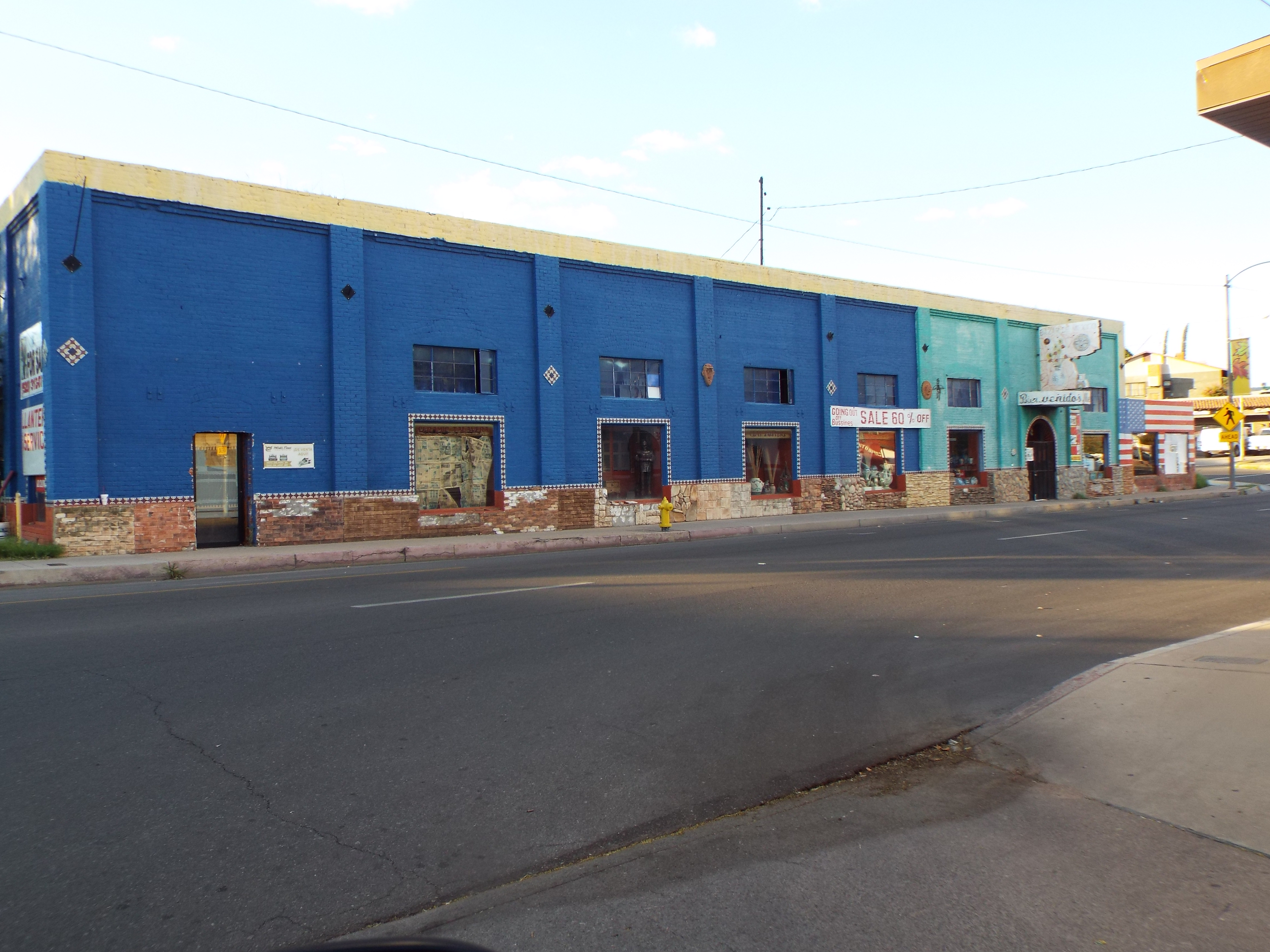
Nogales Electric Light, Ice & Water Company Power House

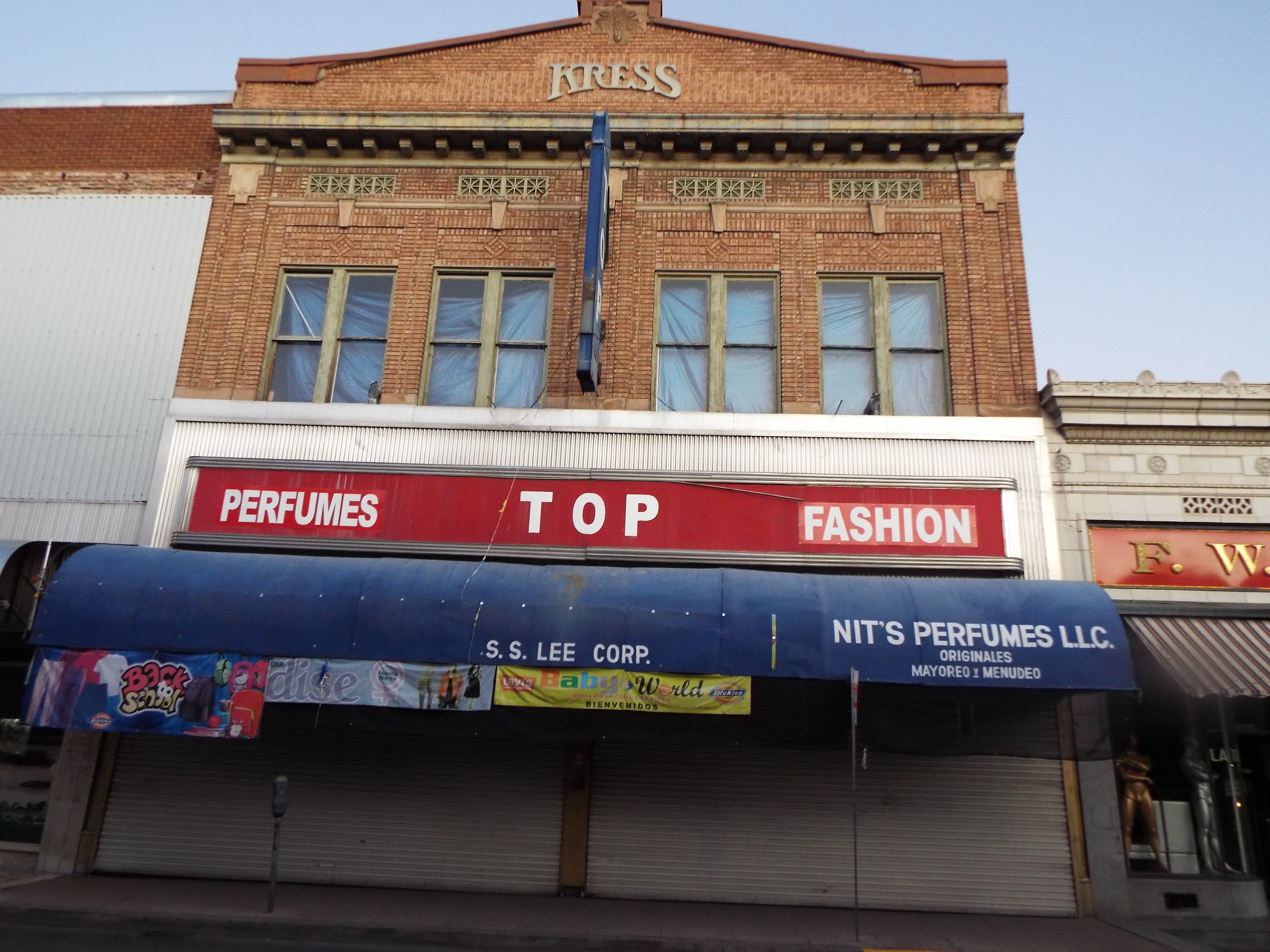
S.H. Kress & Co. Building

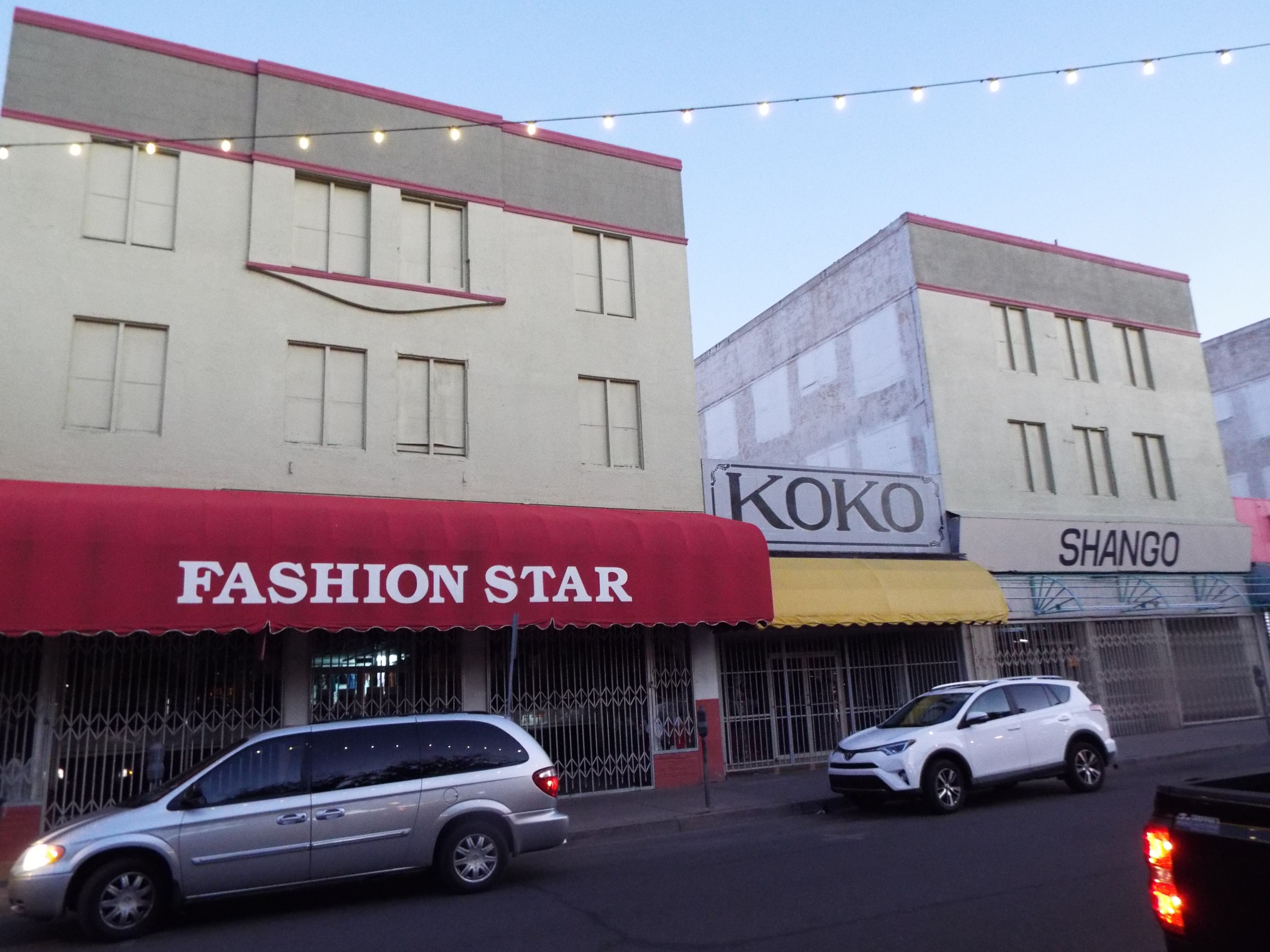
Montezuma Hotel

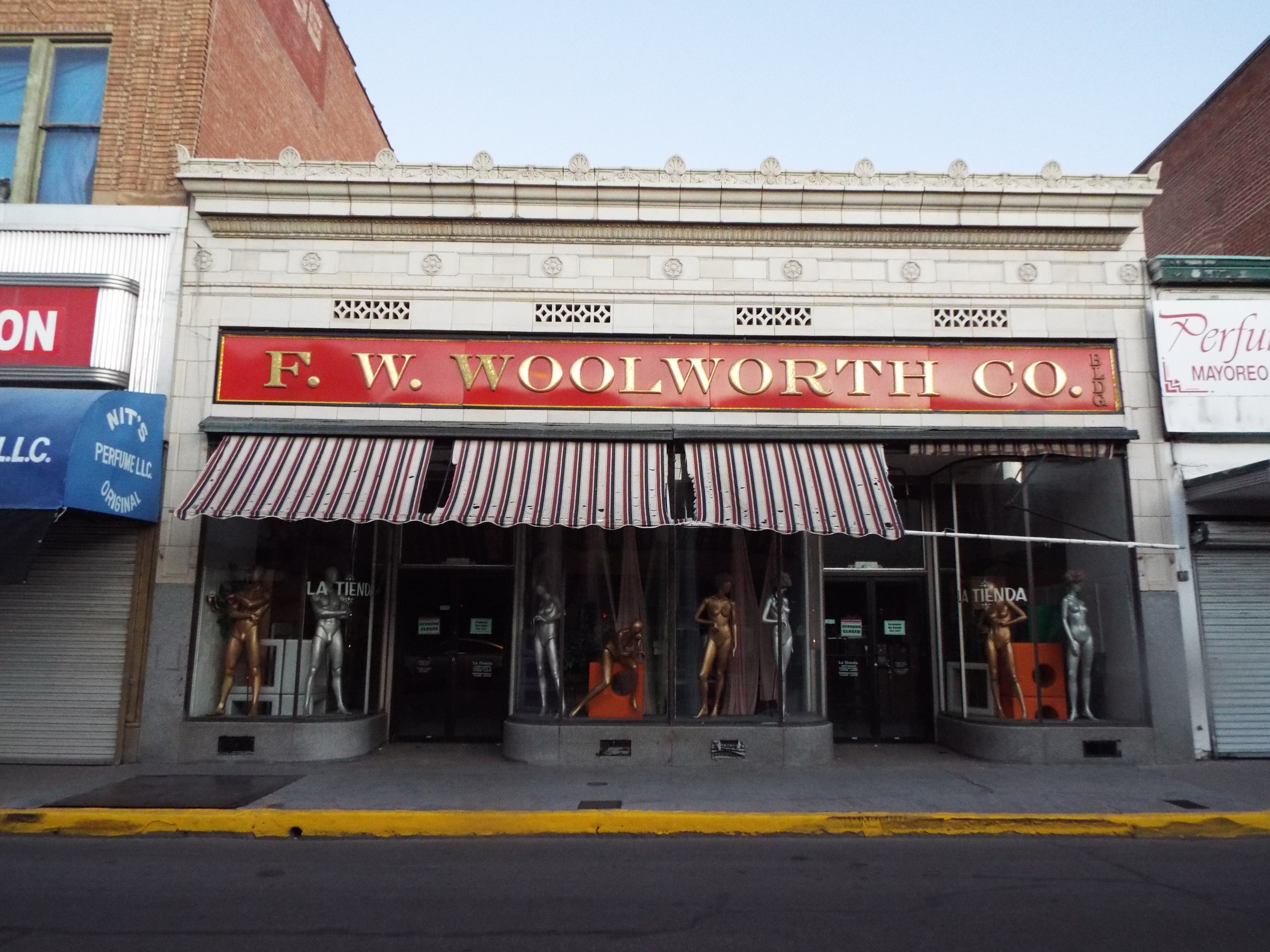
F. L. Woolworth & Co. Building

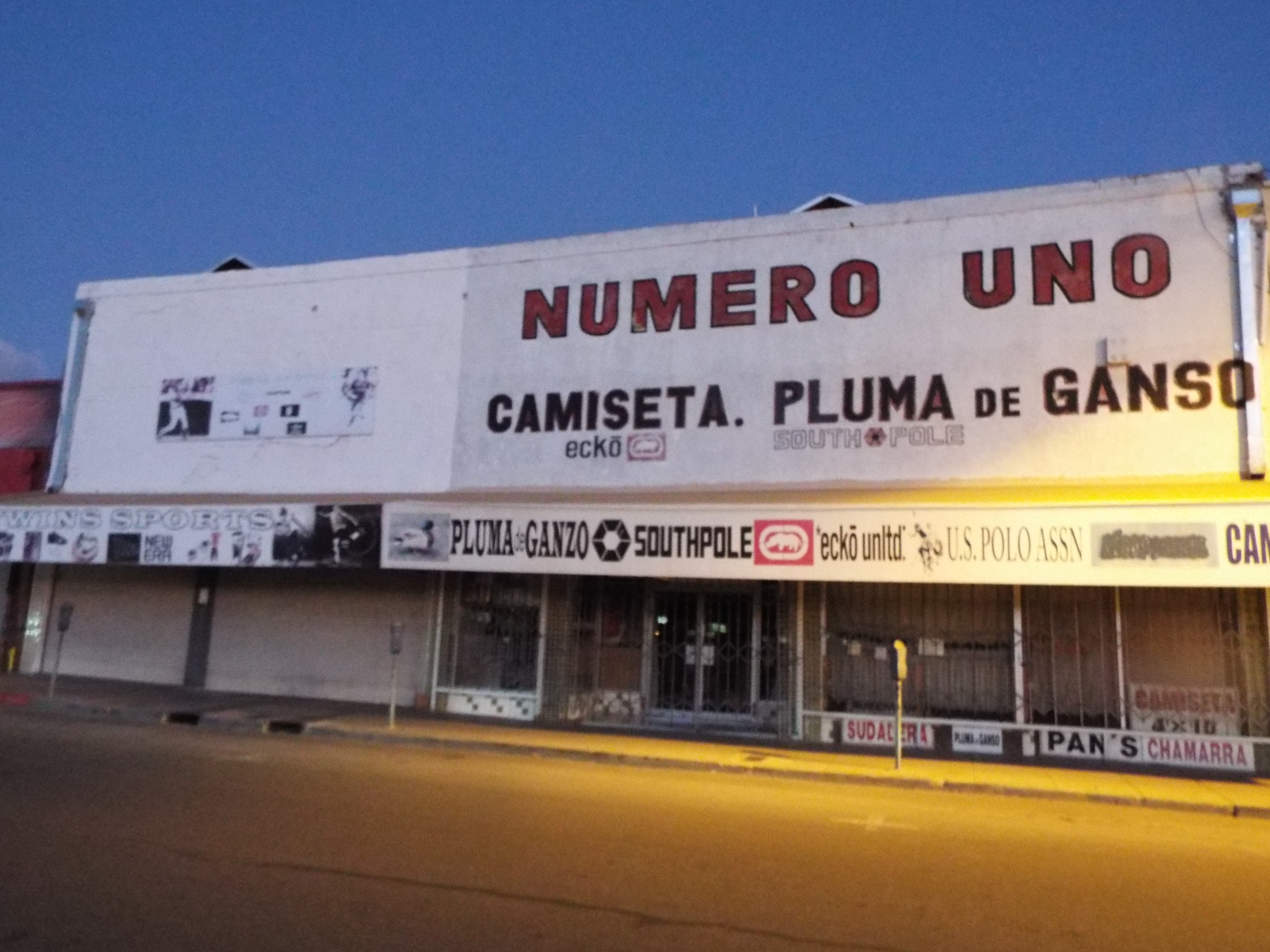
Jose Piscorski Building

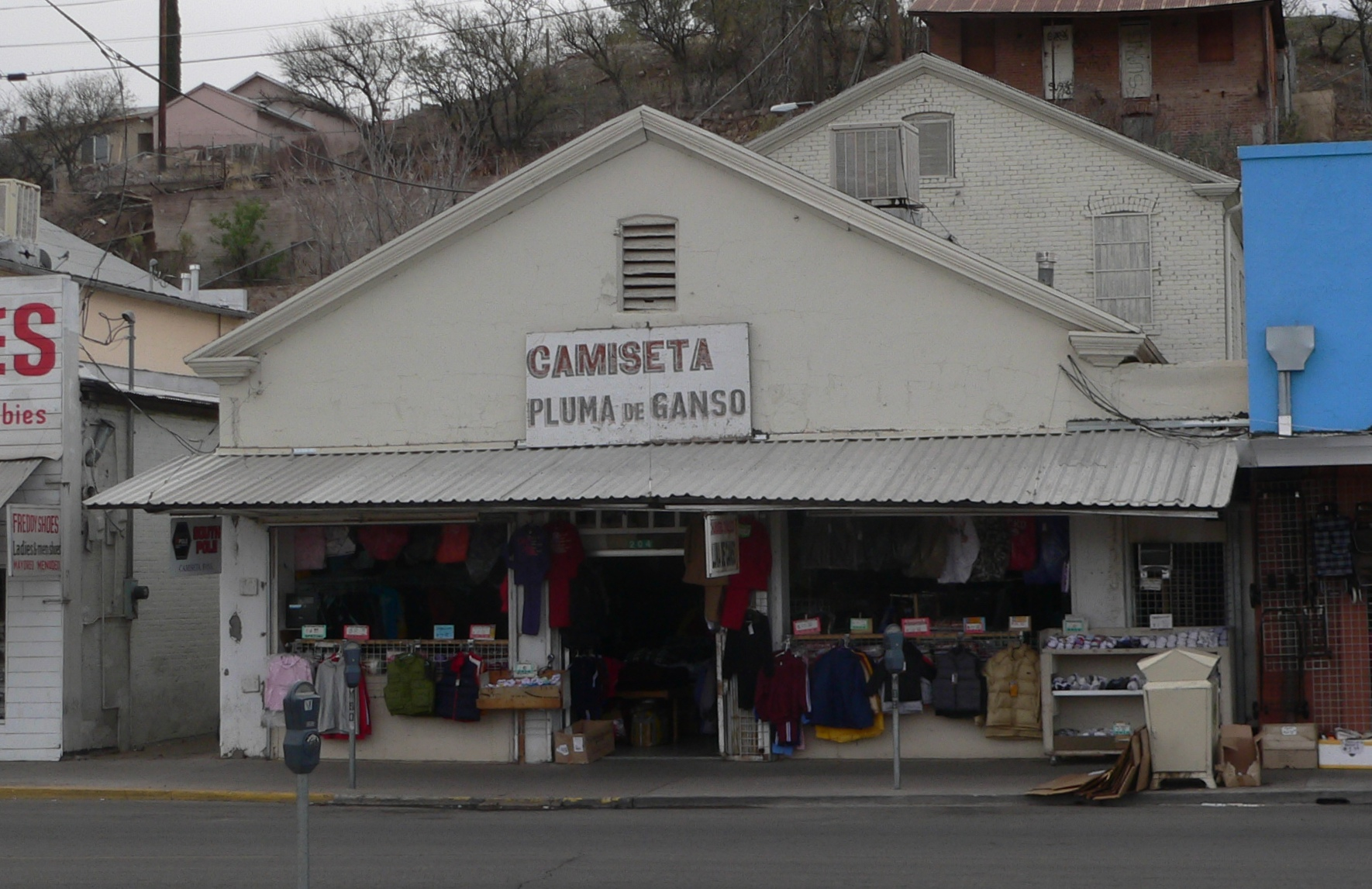
Las Dos Naciones Cigar Factory

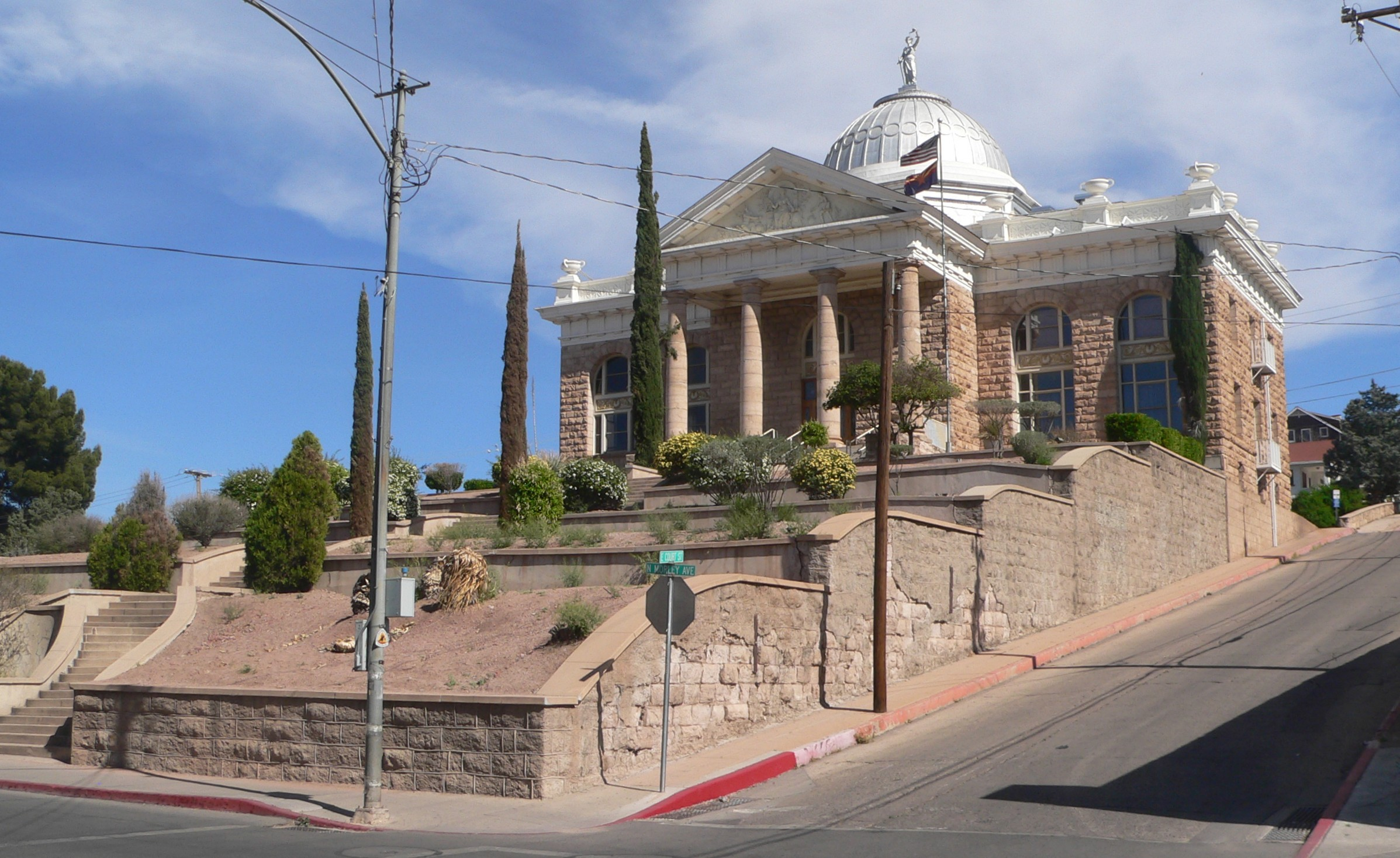
Santa Cruz County Courthouse

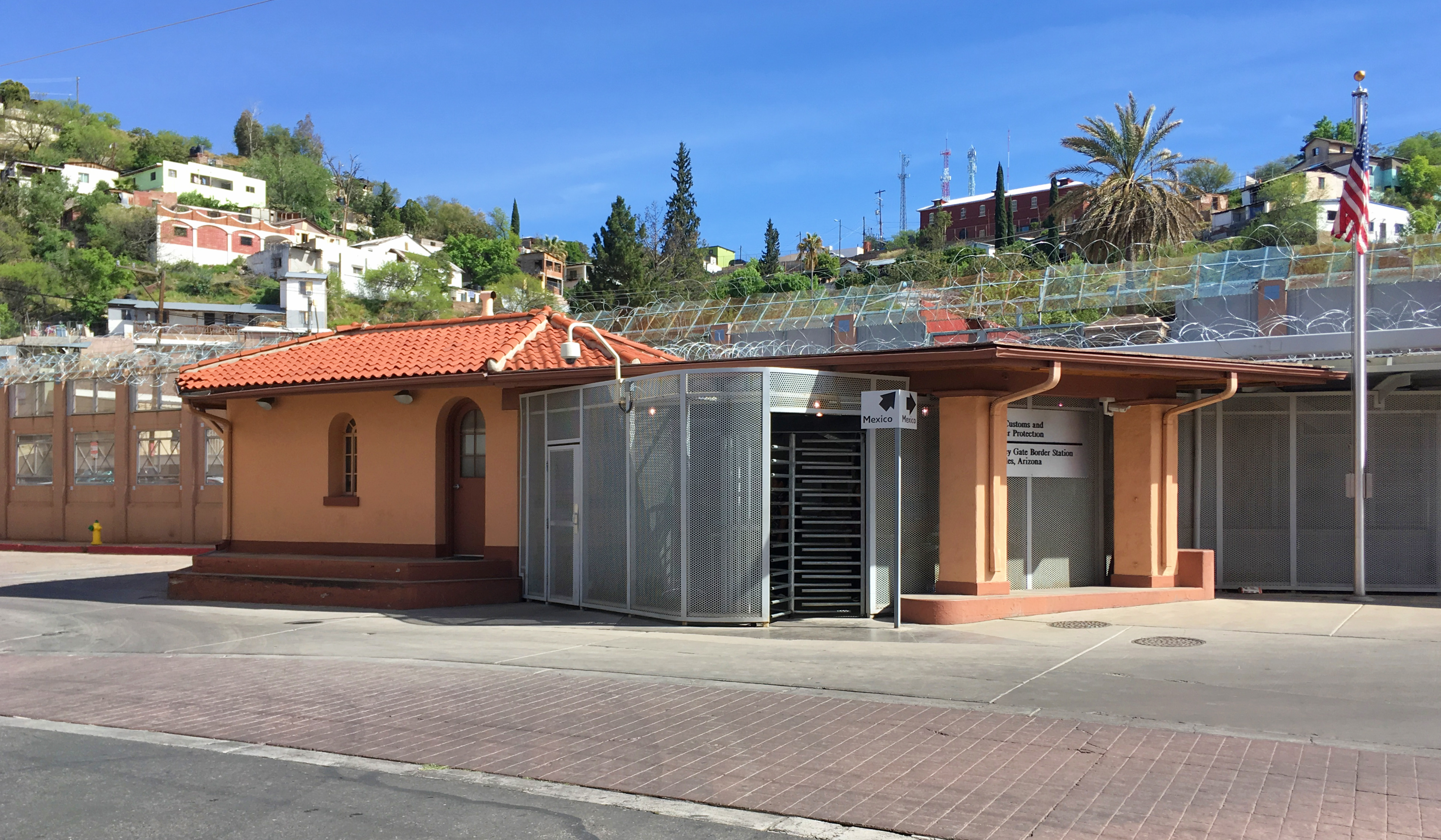
U.S. Custom House and U.S. Inspection Office

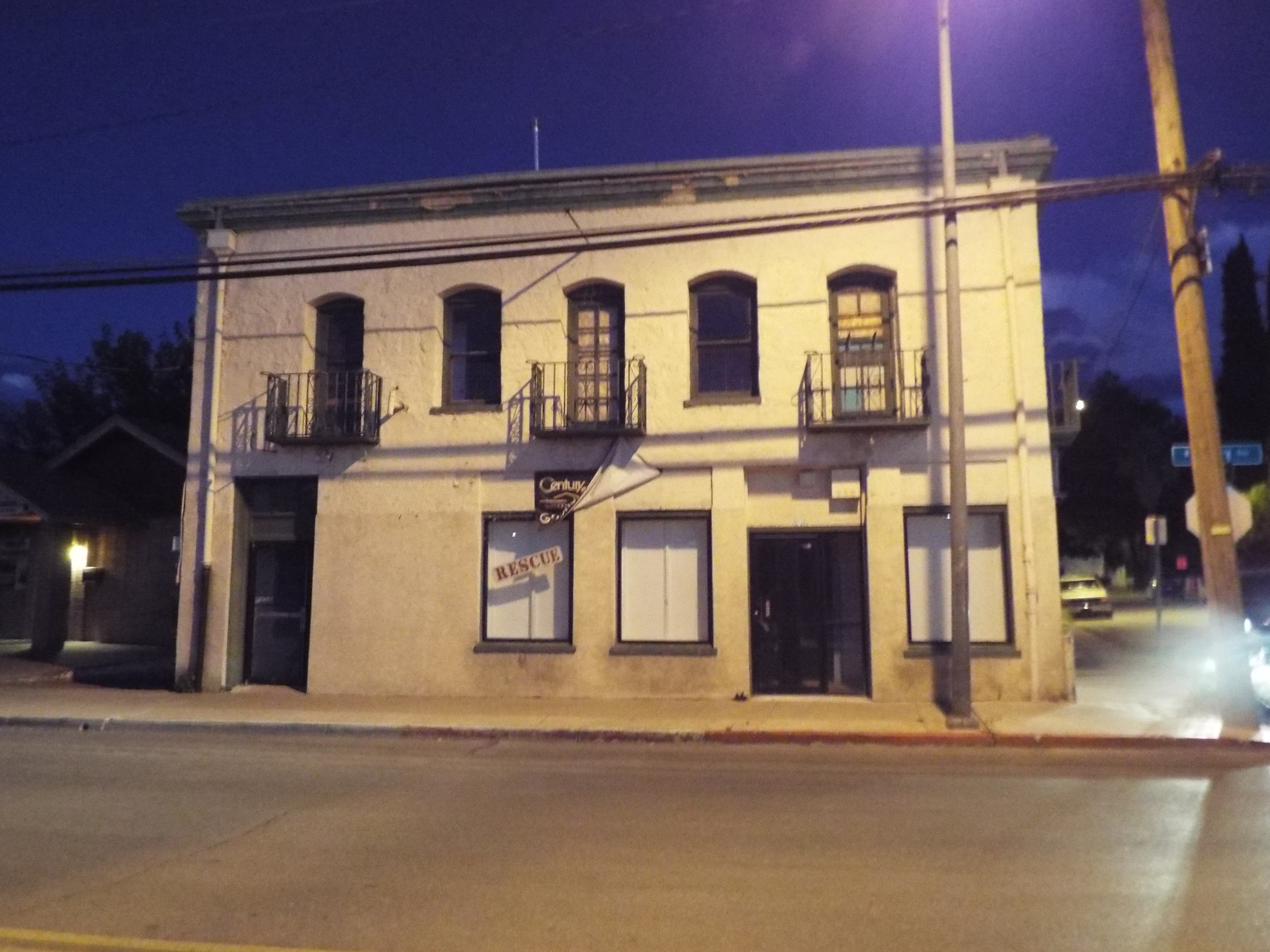
Hotel Blanca

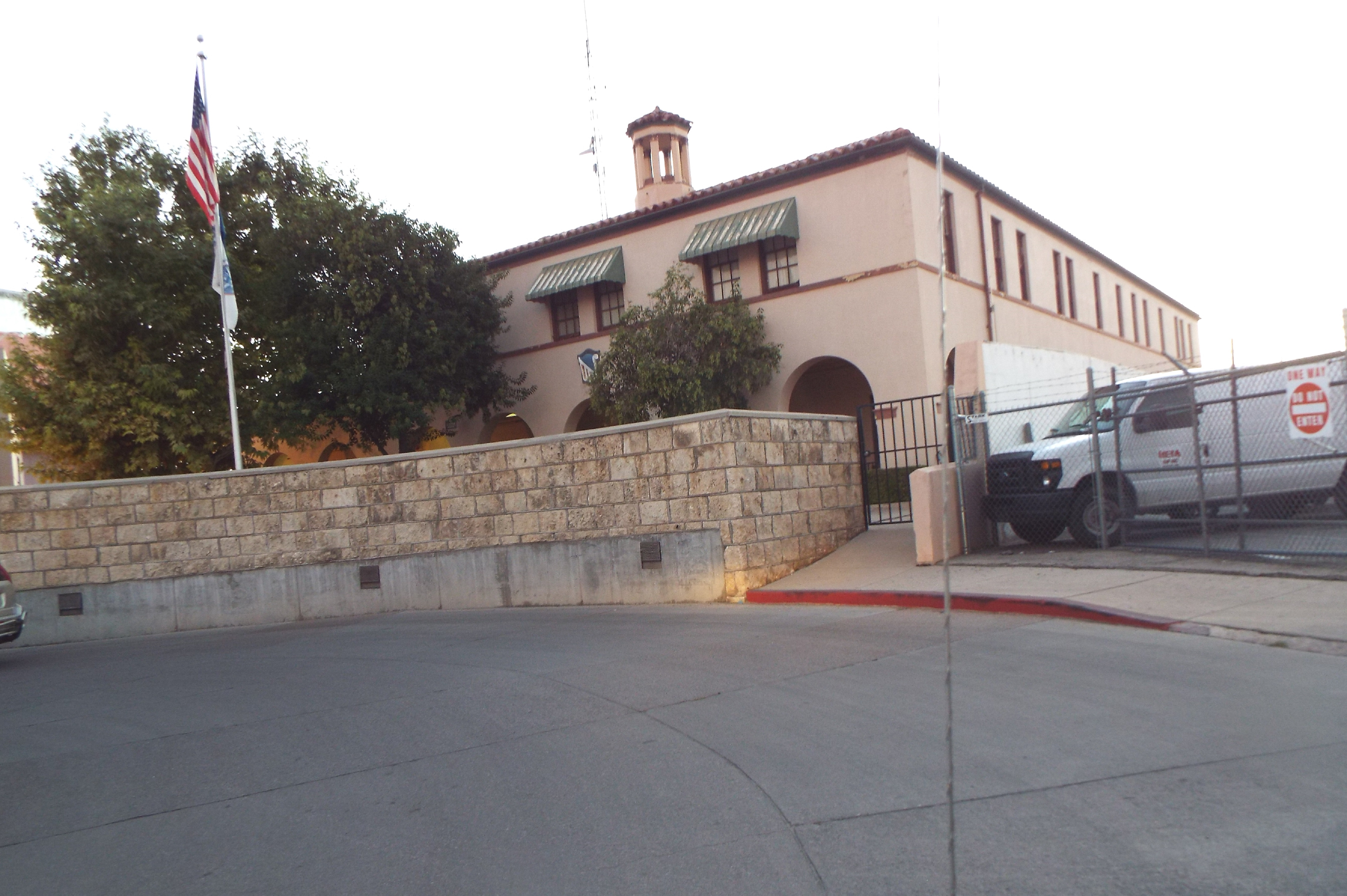
U.S. Custom House

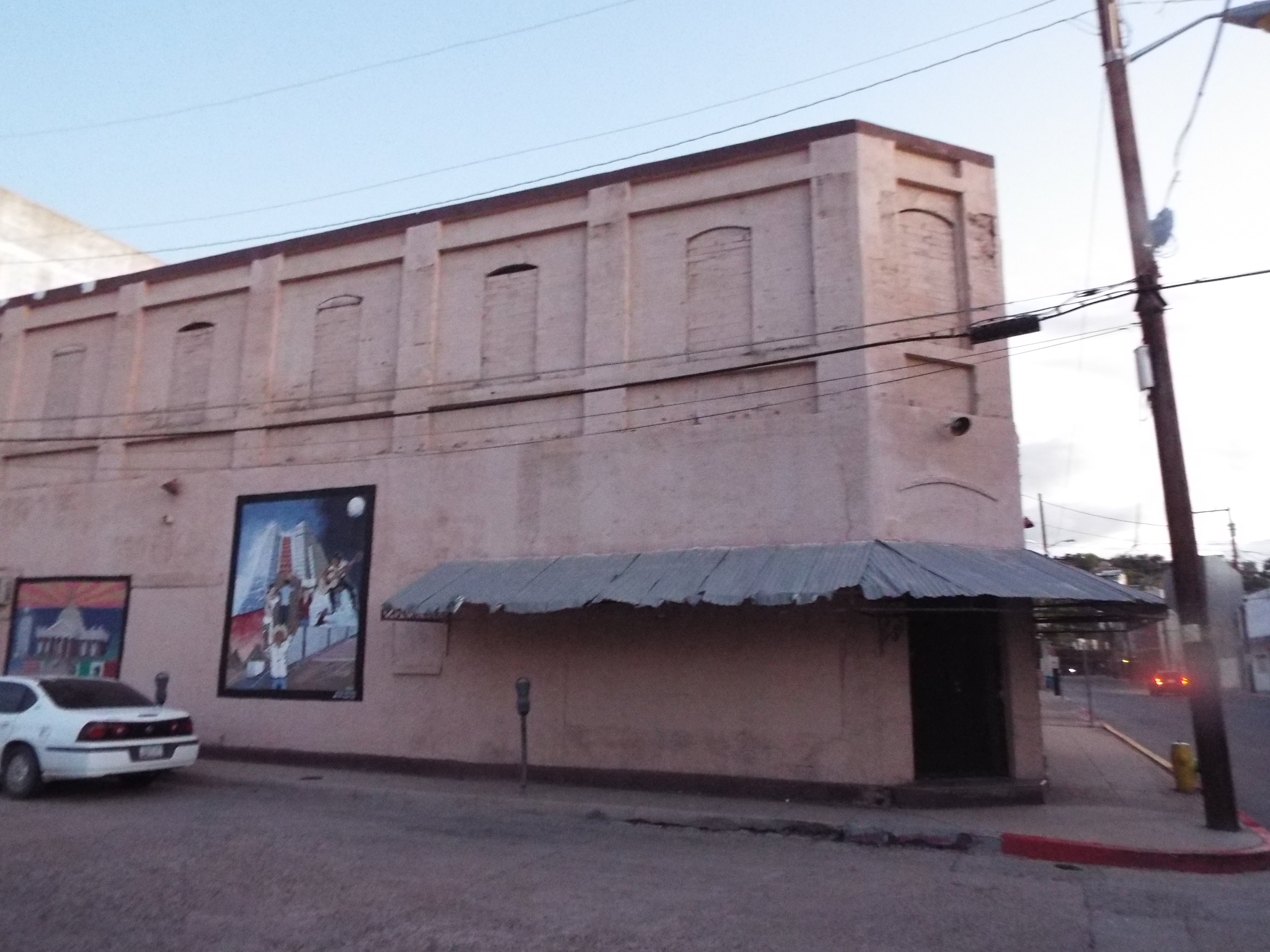
Nogales Steam Laundry Building

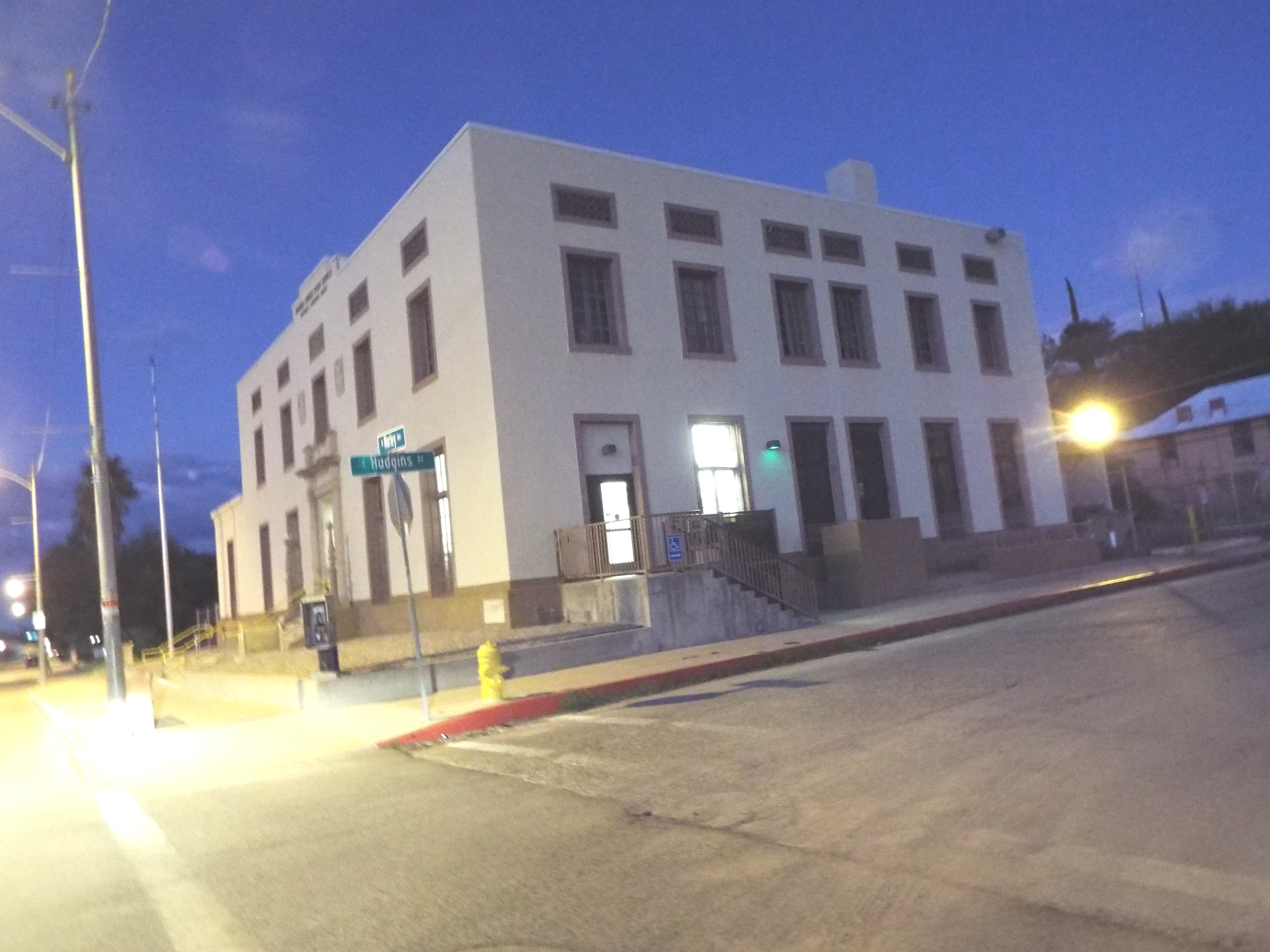
U.S. Post Office and Immigration Station

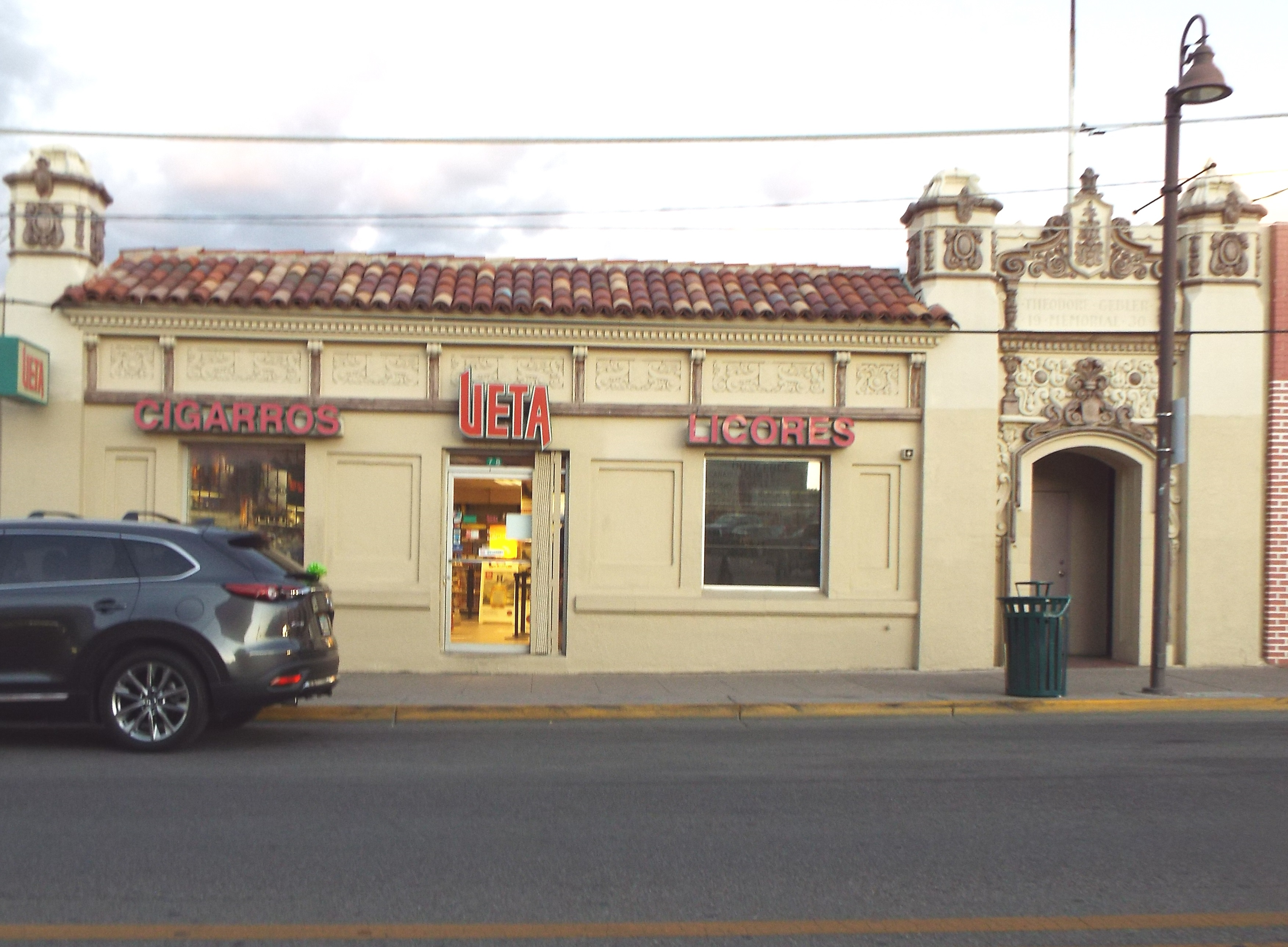
Theodore Gebler Memorial Building

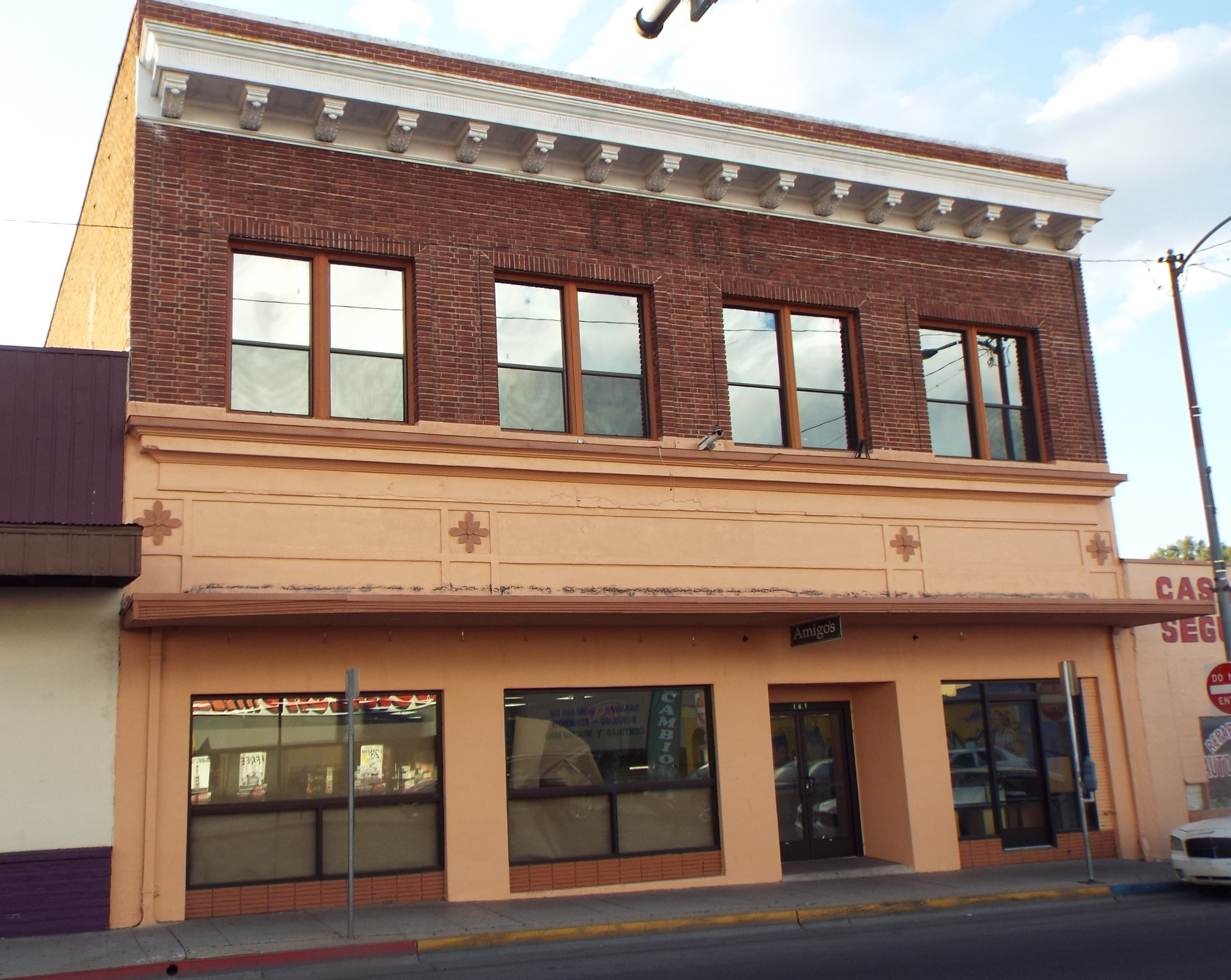
Elks Lodge Building (BPO6)

=== Historic houses ===
The houses in Nogales of historical significance which are listed in the National Register of Historic Places and which are pictured are the following:

- 10 Cottages on Short Street – built in 1900 and located on Short Street. These 10 concrete cottages were built as modest worker's housing early in the twentieth century. They are significant to the Nogales area because they are the only examples of cast-in-place concrete construction in the residential sector. Listed in the National Register of Historic Places on August 29, 1985, reference: #85001873.
- George Dunbar House – built in 1918 and located at 605 Sierra Street. This was the residence of the first developer in Nogales, George Dunbar, who arrived in 1914, from California, and who is responsible for much of the twentieth century residential character of Nogales, Arizona, and Nogales, Sonora. His Nogales projects included the Ellis Tract, the Smelter Tract, the Silver Bell Addition, Dunbar Bungalow Court, and the Mountain View Addition. Listed in the National Register of Historic Places on August 29, 1985, reference: #85001853.
- W.G. Bowman House, – built in 1918 and located at 613 Sierra Street. The W. G. Bowman House was built for one of Nogales' most influential and prolific real estate holders and businessmen during the height of his local career. Wirt G. Bowman was also a prominent state and national political figure. Listed in the National Register of Historic Places on August 29, 1985, reference: #85001850.
- Frank F. Cranz House – built in 1900 and located at 321 Arroyo Street. It is the largest Queen Anne style-influenced residence in Nogales, the Frank F. Cranz House was built for the prominent mining man and Mayor of Nogales (1904–1906). Listed in the National Register of Historic Places on August 29, 1985, reference: #85001849.
- Mediterranean Style House – built in 1900 and located at 215 Walnut Street. This house is the best local example of a Mediterranean style single-family residence in Nogales. Listed in the National Register of Historic Places on August 29, 1985, reference: #85001863.
- Mediterranean Style House – built in 1900 and located at 245 Walnut Street. This brick house with a rusticated stucco exterior exhibits a unique local interpretation of the Mediterranean style. Listed in the National Register of Historic Places on August 29, 1985, reference: #85001862.
- House at 365 Walnut Street – built in 1909 and located at 365 Walnut Street. Listed in the National Register of Historic Places on August 29, 1985, reference: #85001856.
- House at 459–465 Walnut Street – built in 1900 and located at 459–465 Walnut Street. It is the best local example of cast-in-place concrete residential construction. Classical pilasters and cantons and a flat roofed portico supported by two classic square columns are other notable features of this residence. Listed in the National Register of Historic Places on August 29, 1985, reference: #85001857.
- Three Mediterranean Cottages on Pajarito Street – built in 1920 and located at 141 and 147 Pajarito Street and 533 Potrero Street. This project is the best example of Mediterranean style cottages in Nogales. The buildings are symbolic of population growth in Nogales during the post-World War I years. Listed in the National Register of Historic Places on February 10, 2000, reference: #00000004.
- Hugo Miller House – built in 1912 and located at N. 565 Potrero Street. This Craftsman Bungalow is the best residential example of concrete brick construction in Nogales. It was the home of Hugo Miller, a prominent Nogales assayer who worked in many of the large mining districts of New Mexico and Nevada before moving to Nogales in 1912. Listed in the National Register of Historic Places on August 29, 1985, reference: #85001864.
- House at 565 Morley Avenue – built in 1915 and located at 565 N Morley Avenue. This building features unique characteristics of the High Victorian Italianate (use of stilted segmented arch with vertical continuation of architectrave moulding; pedimental forms at dormers that are unrelated to anything in the façade below) and Neo-colonial Revival (strict attention to symmetry and use of hipped roof) architectural styles. Listed in the National Register of Historic Places on August 29, 1985, reference: #85001858.
- The Senator James A. Harrison House – built in 1915 and located at 446 N Morley Avenue. The best-preserved two-story bungalow in Nogales, this house was built for prominent Nogales politician and businessman, Senator James A. Harrison. The current use of the house is a commercial beauty saloon and school. Its additions are incompatible with the original structure. Listed in the National Register of Historic Places on August 29, 1985, reference: #85001854.
Historic houses
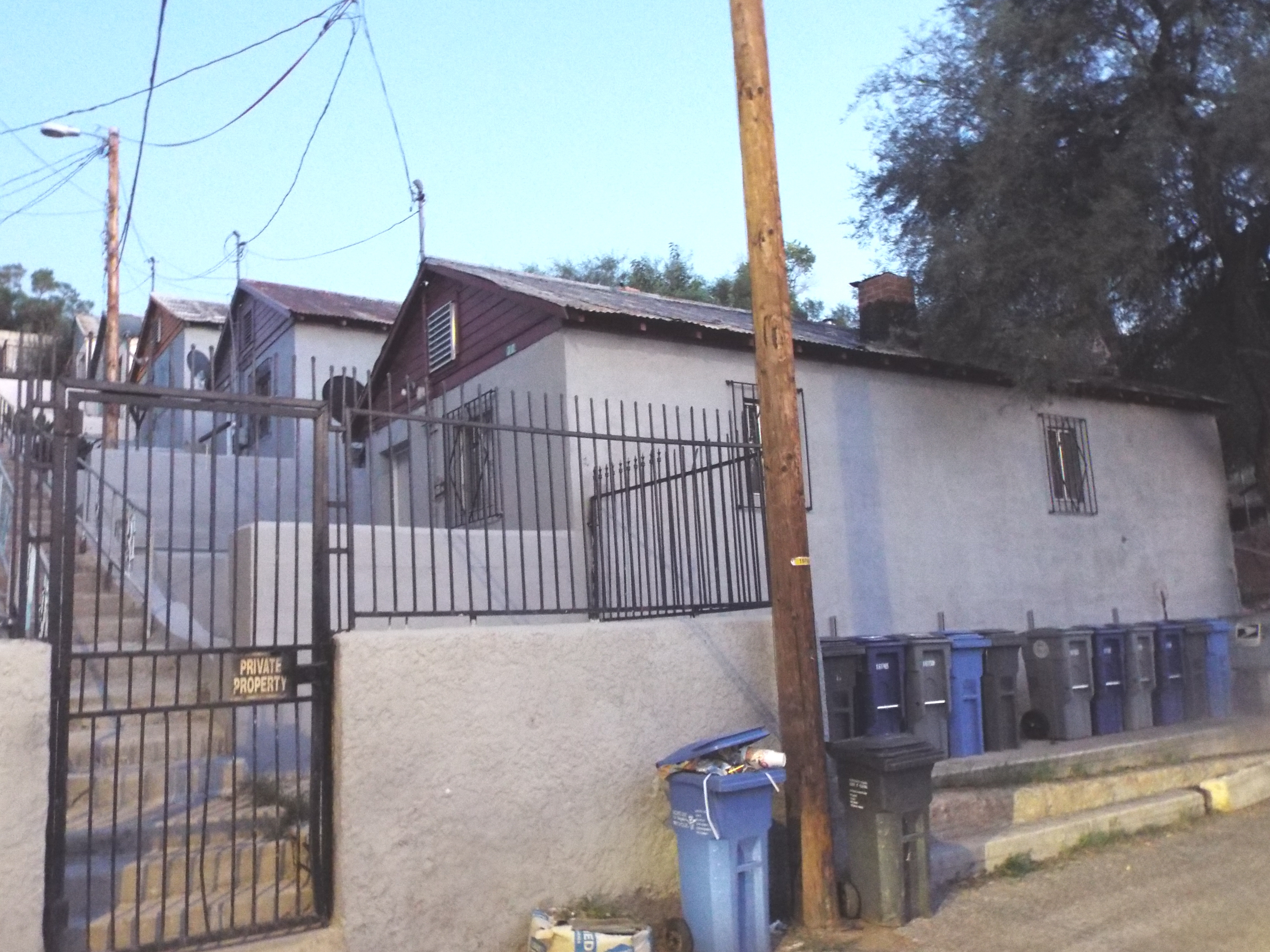
10 Cottages on Short Street

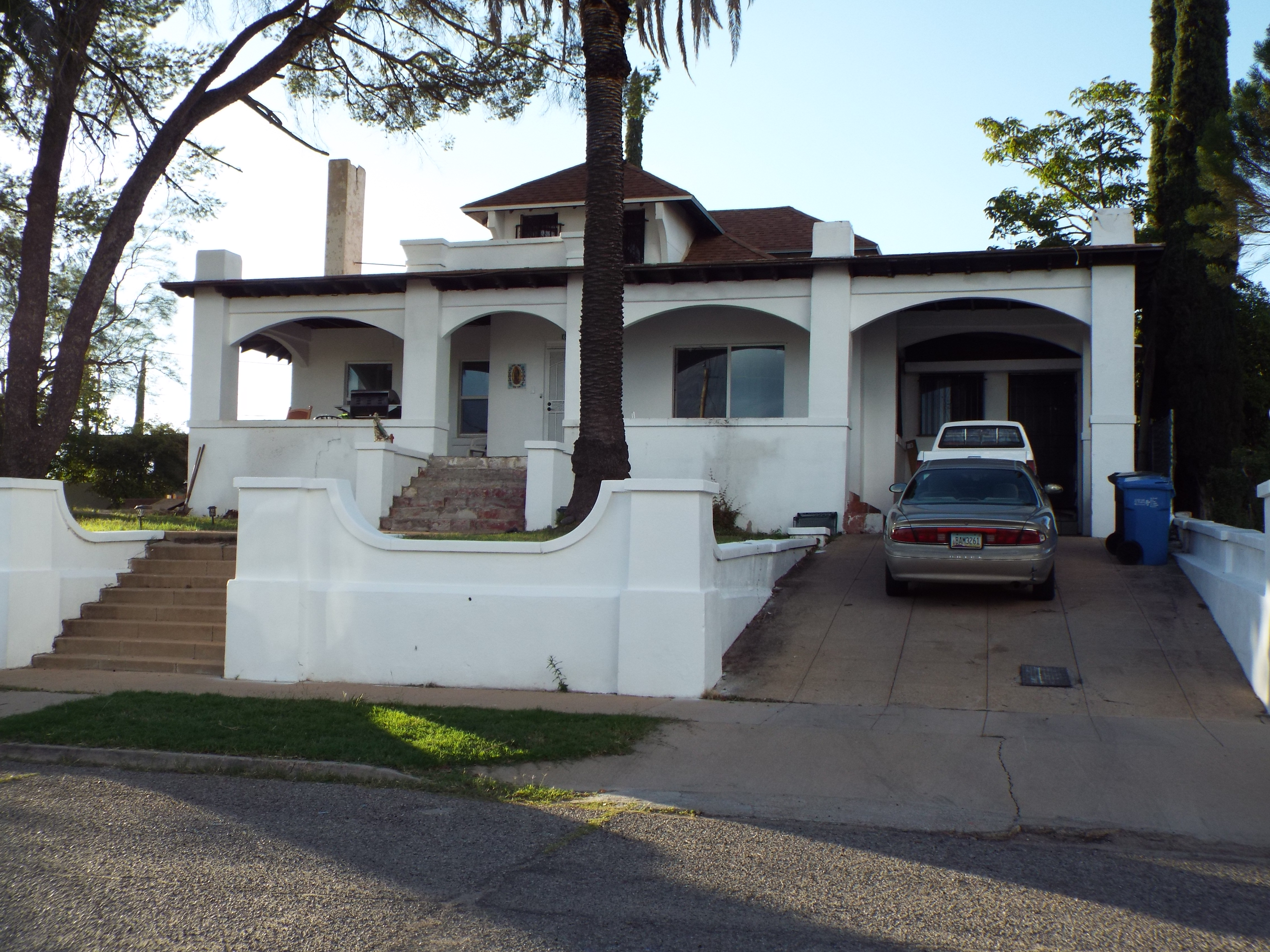
George Dunbar House

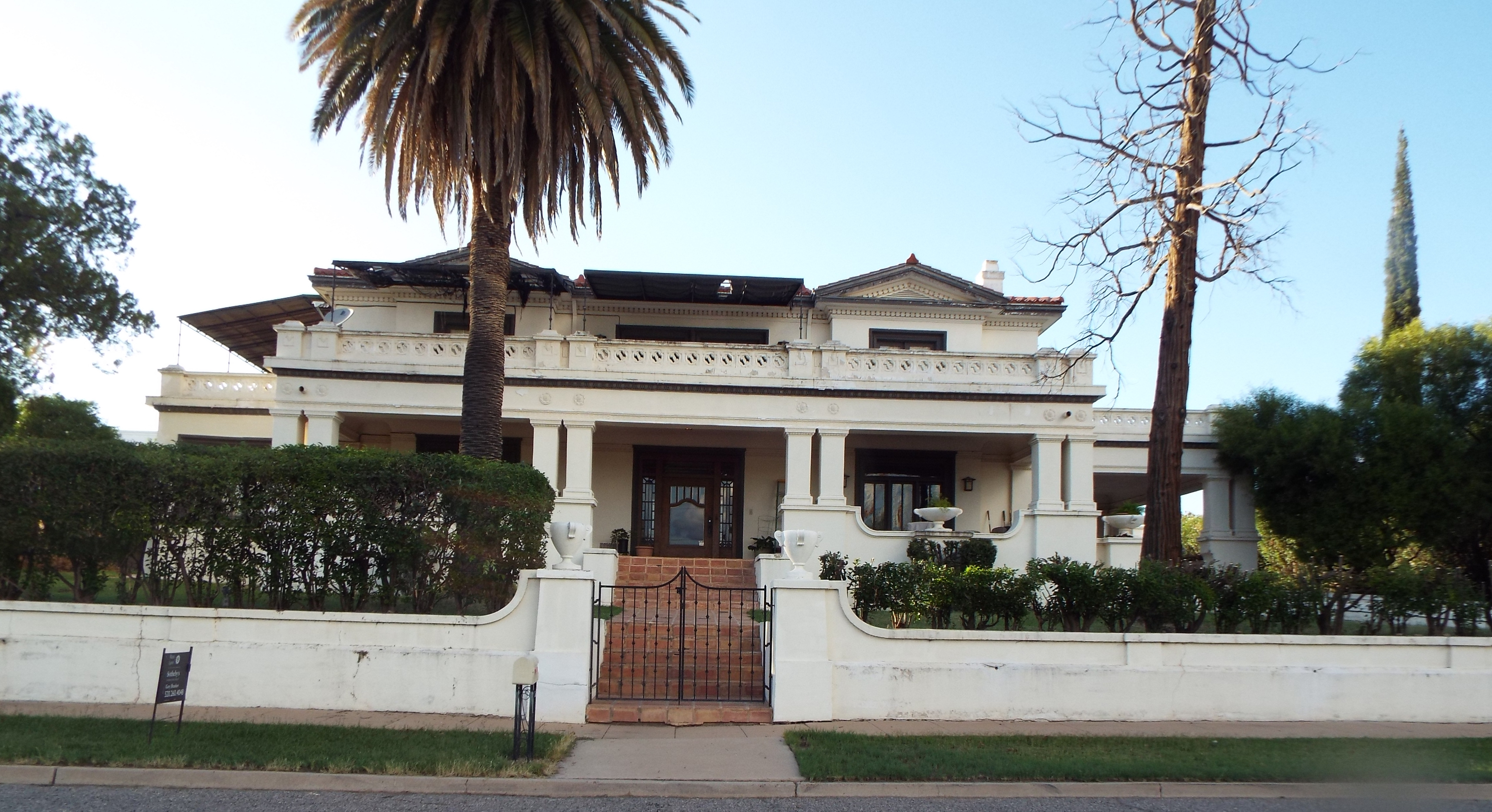
W.G. Bowman House

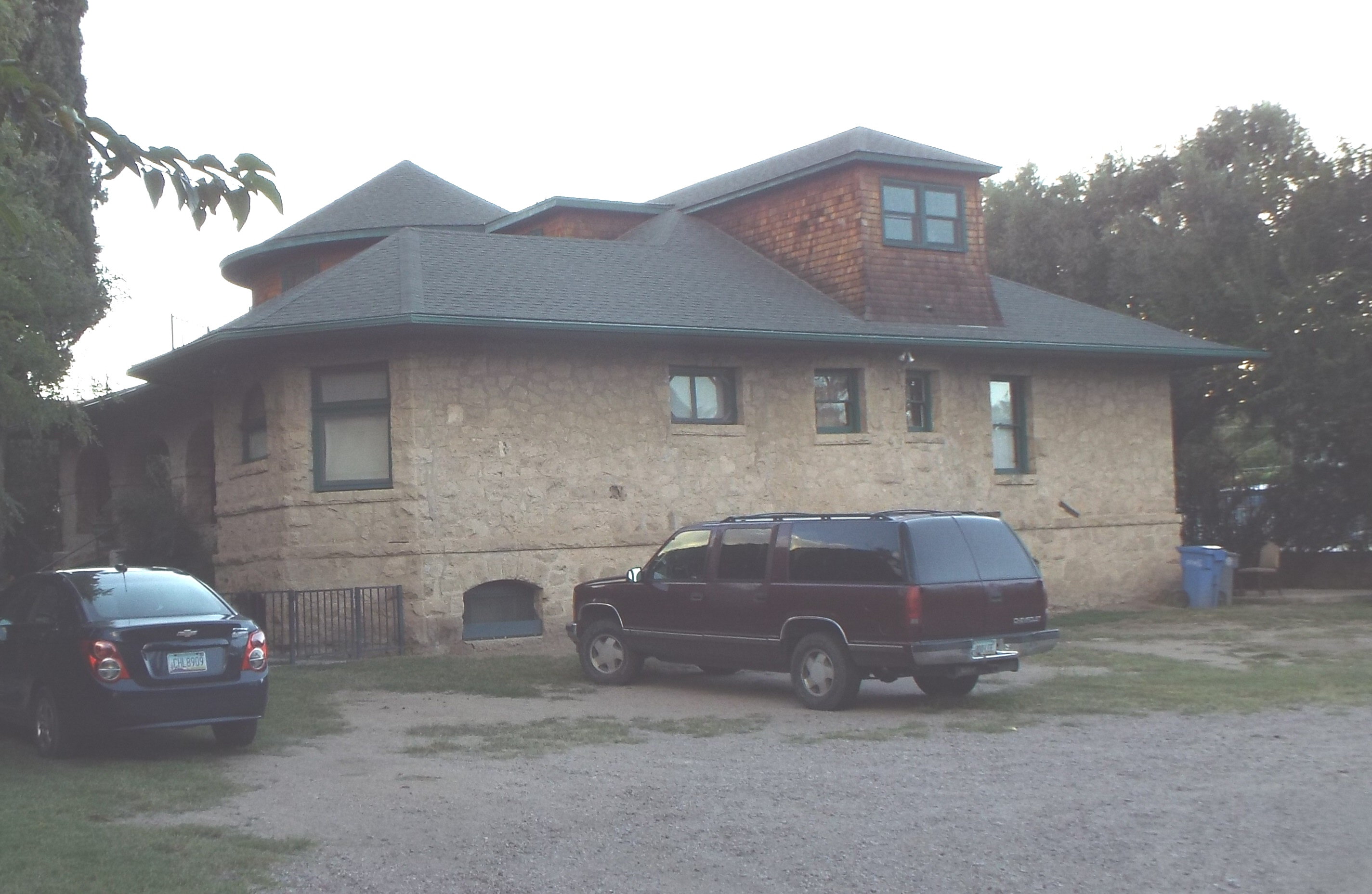
Frank F. Cranz House

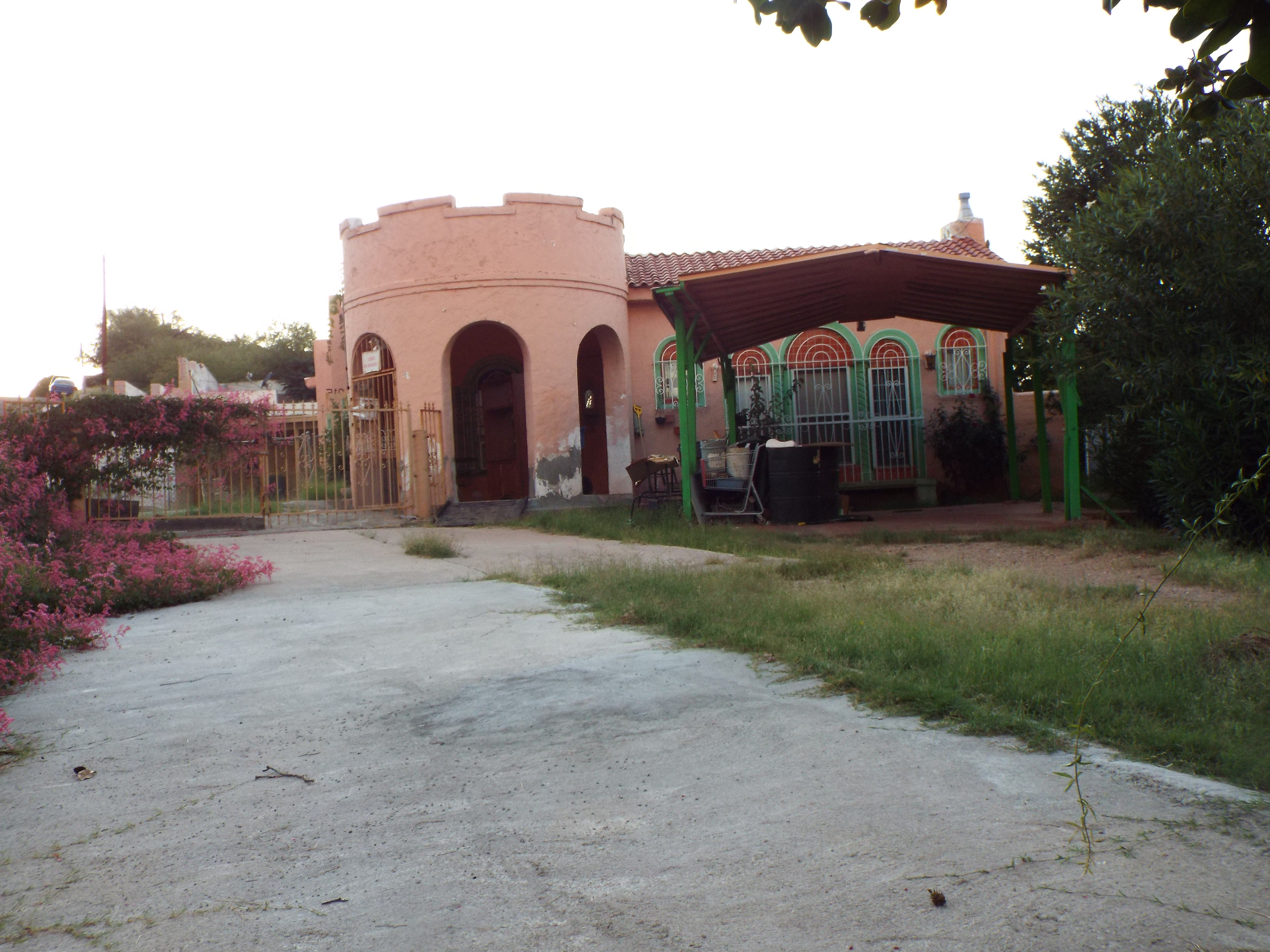
Mediterranean Style House on 215 Walnut Street

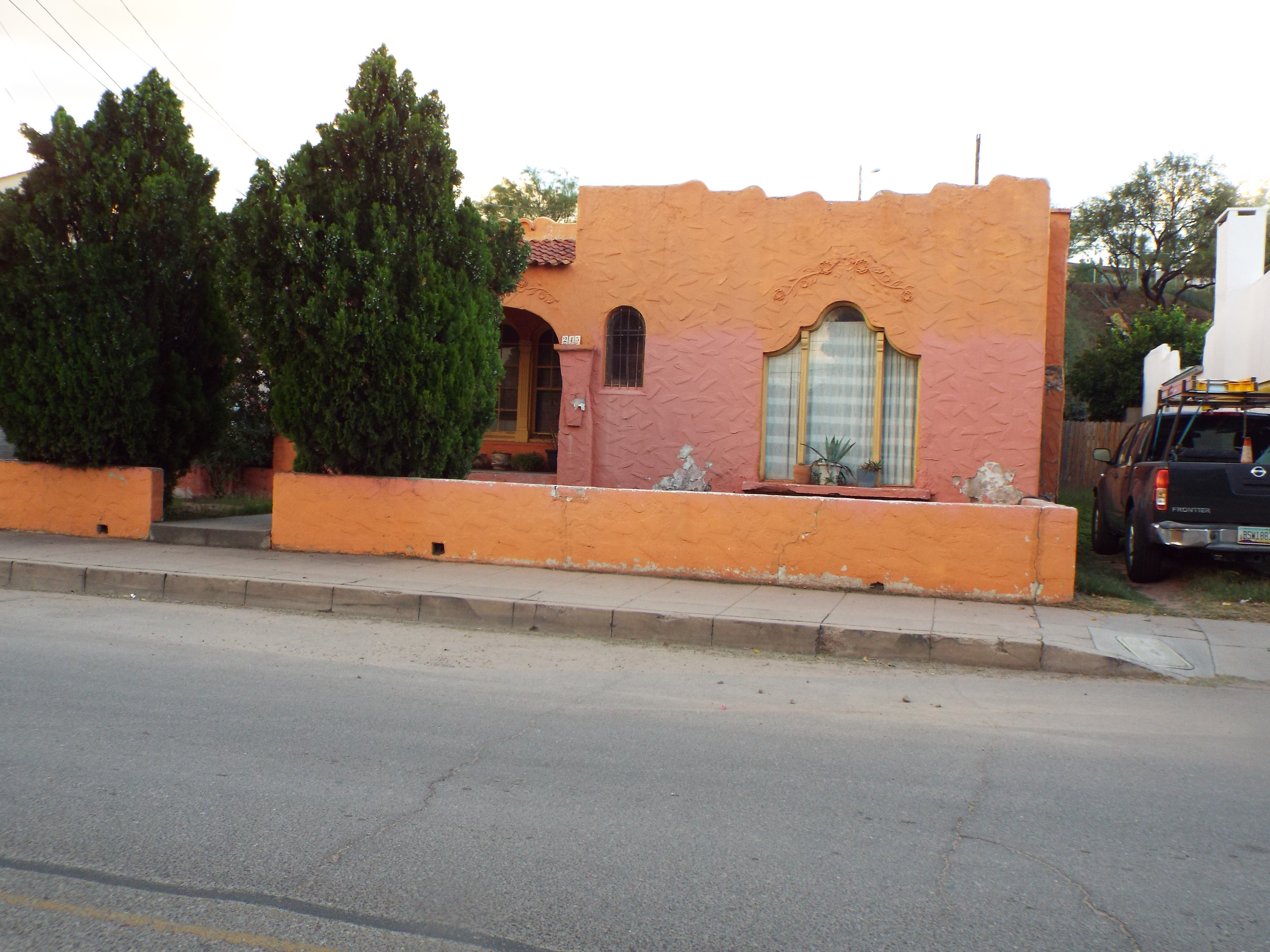
Mediterranean Style House on 245 Walnut Street

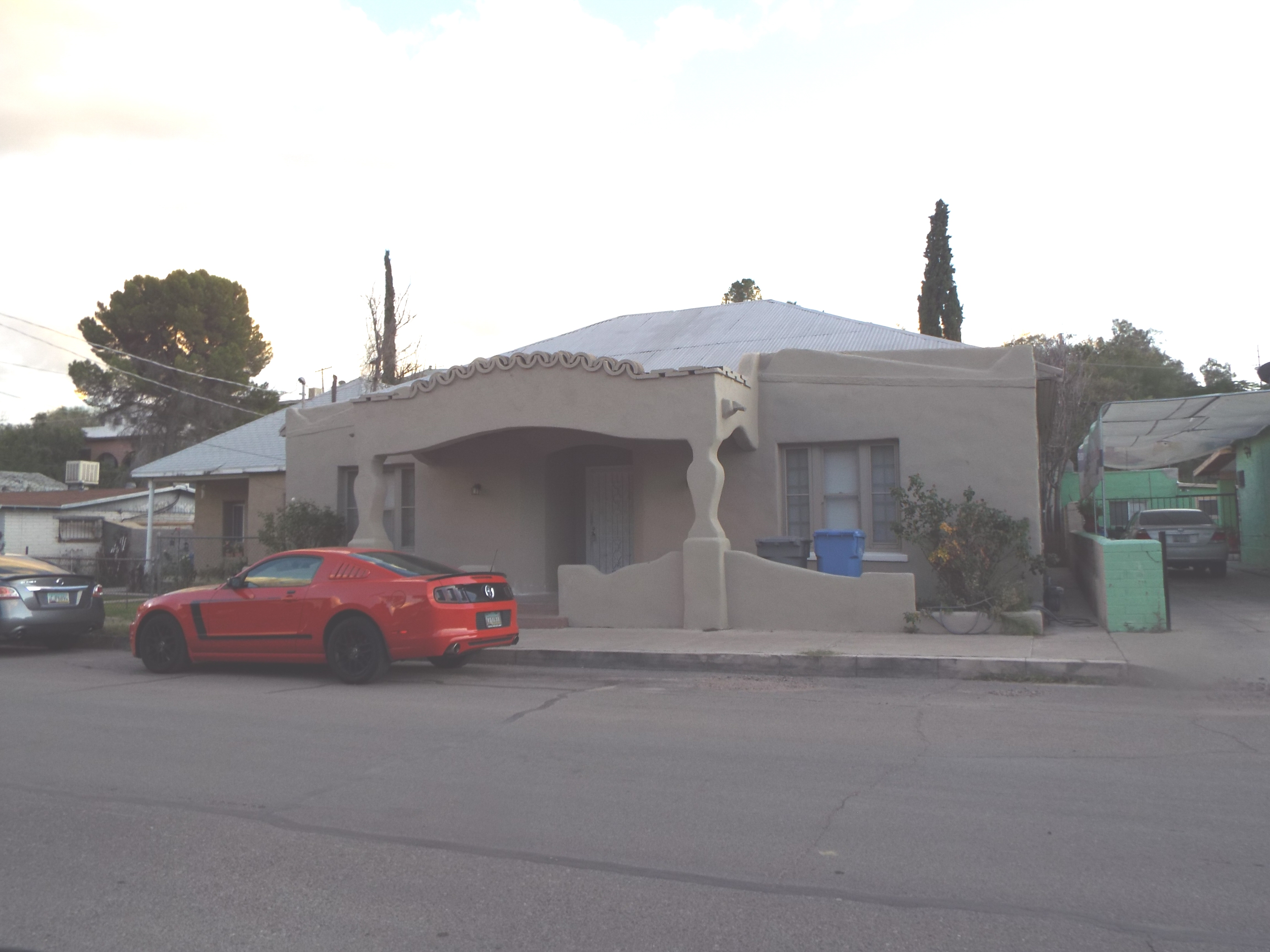
House at 365 Walnut Street

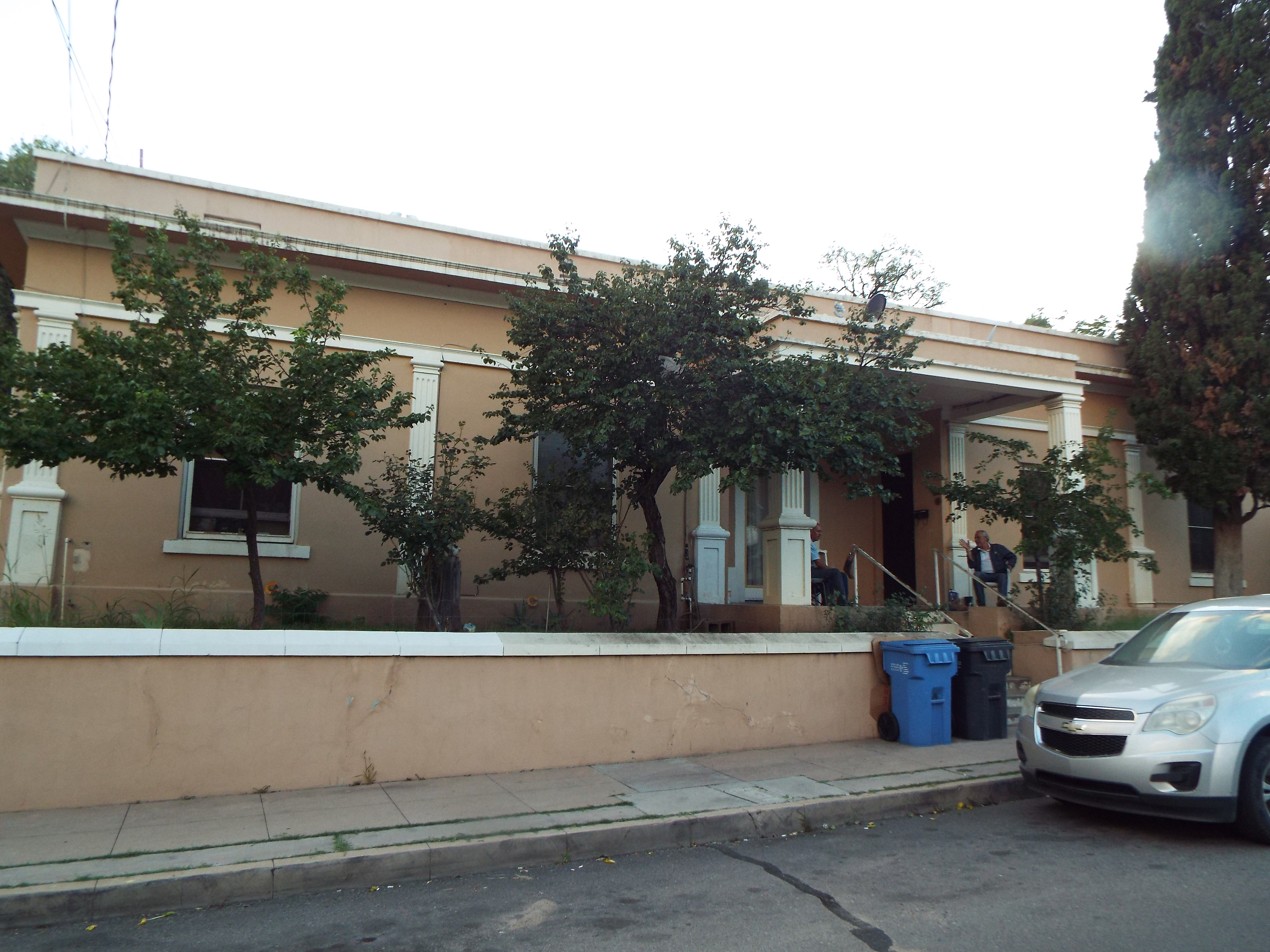
House at 459–465 Walnut Street

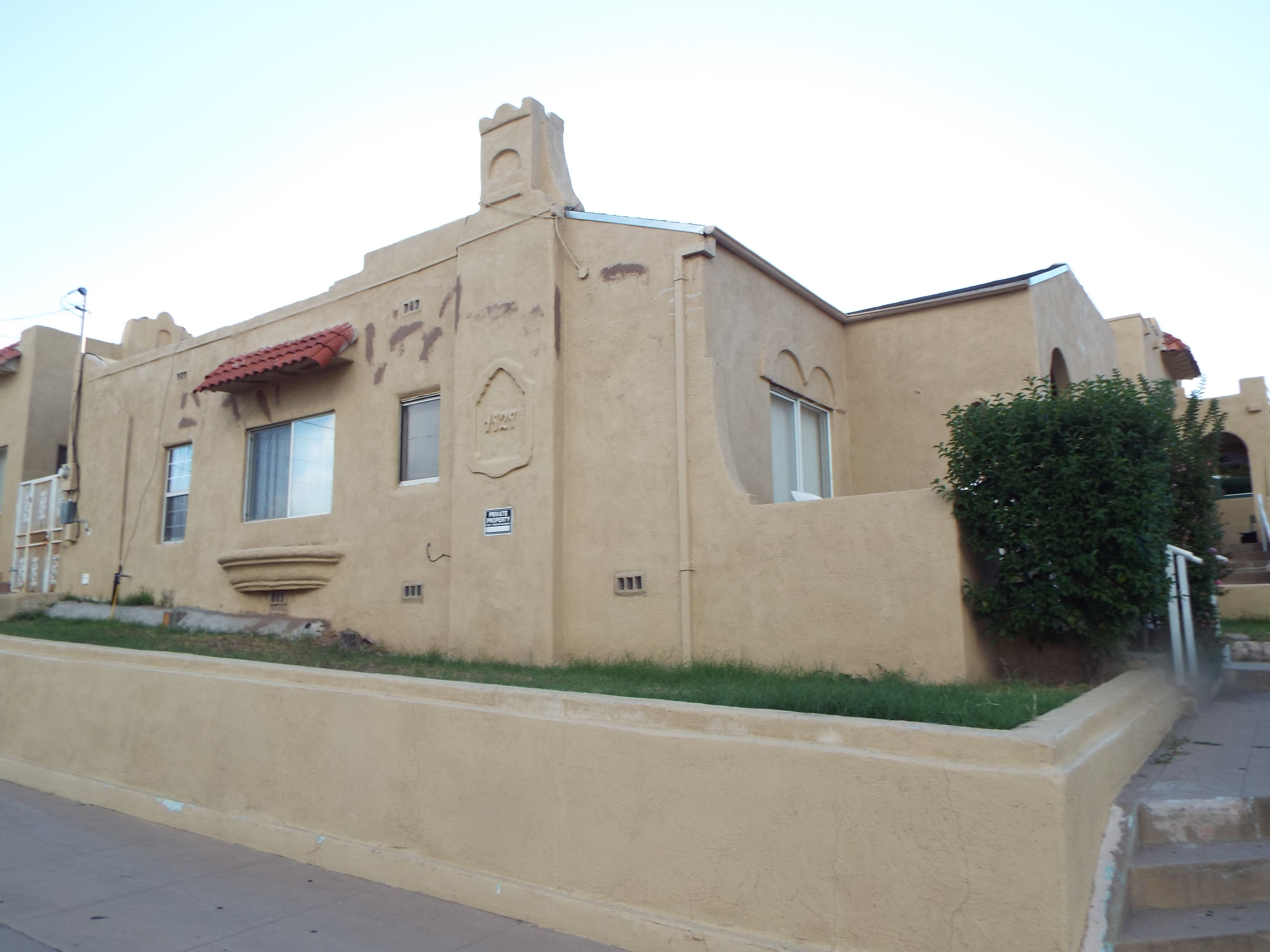
Three Mediterranean Cottages on Pajarito Street

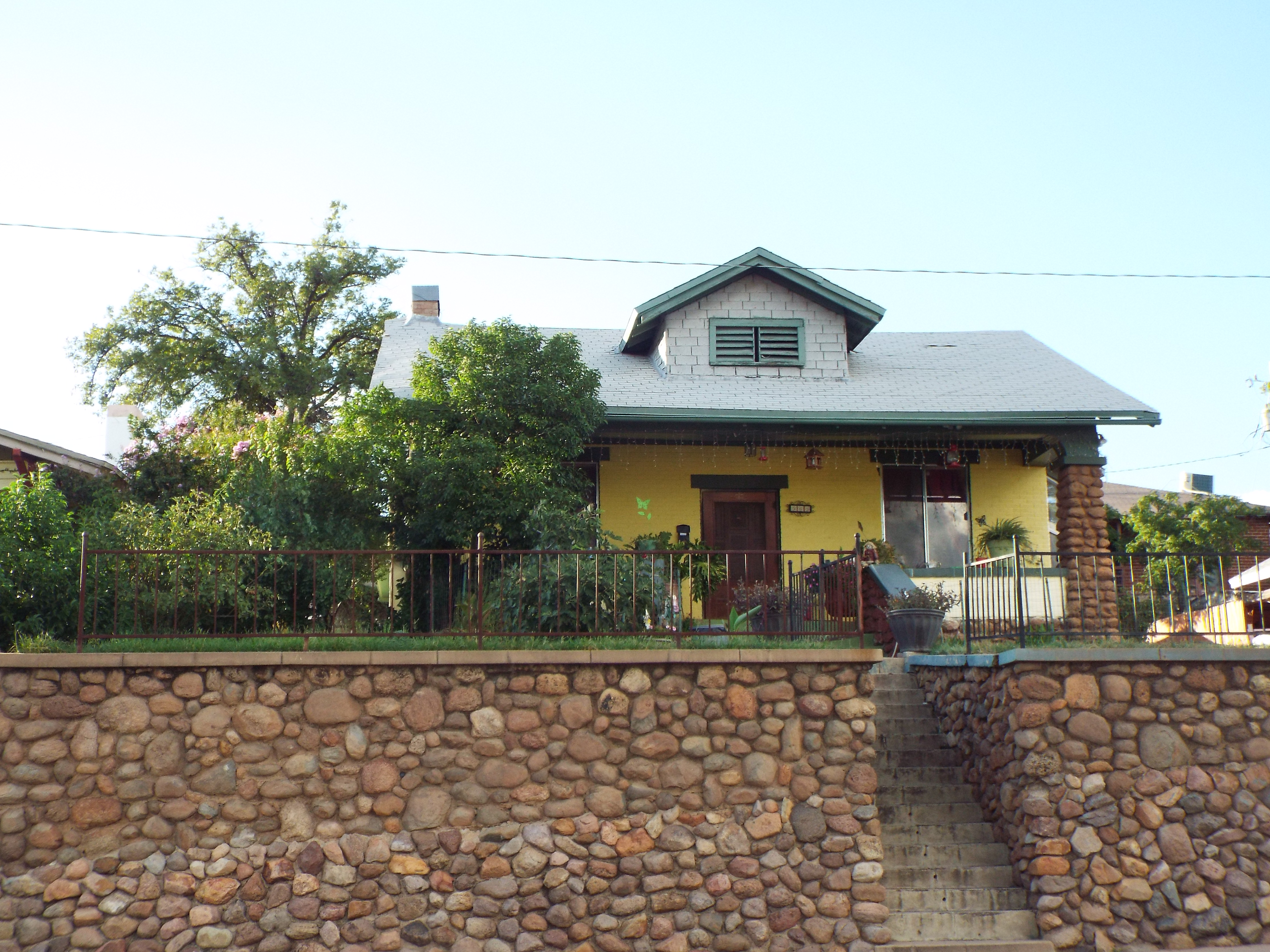
Hugo Miller House

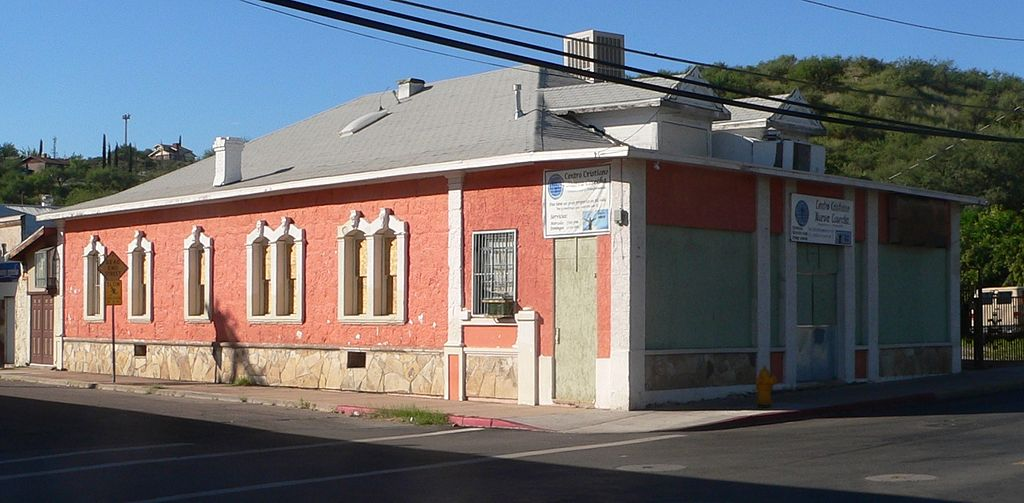
House at 565 Morley Avenue

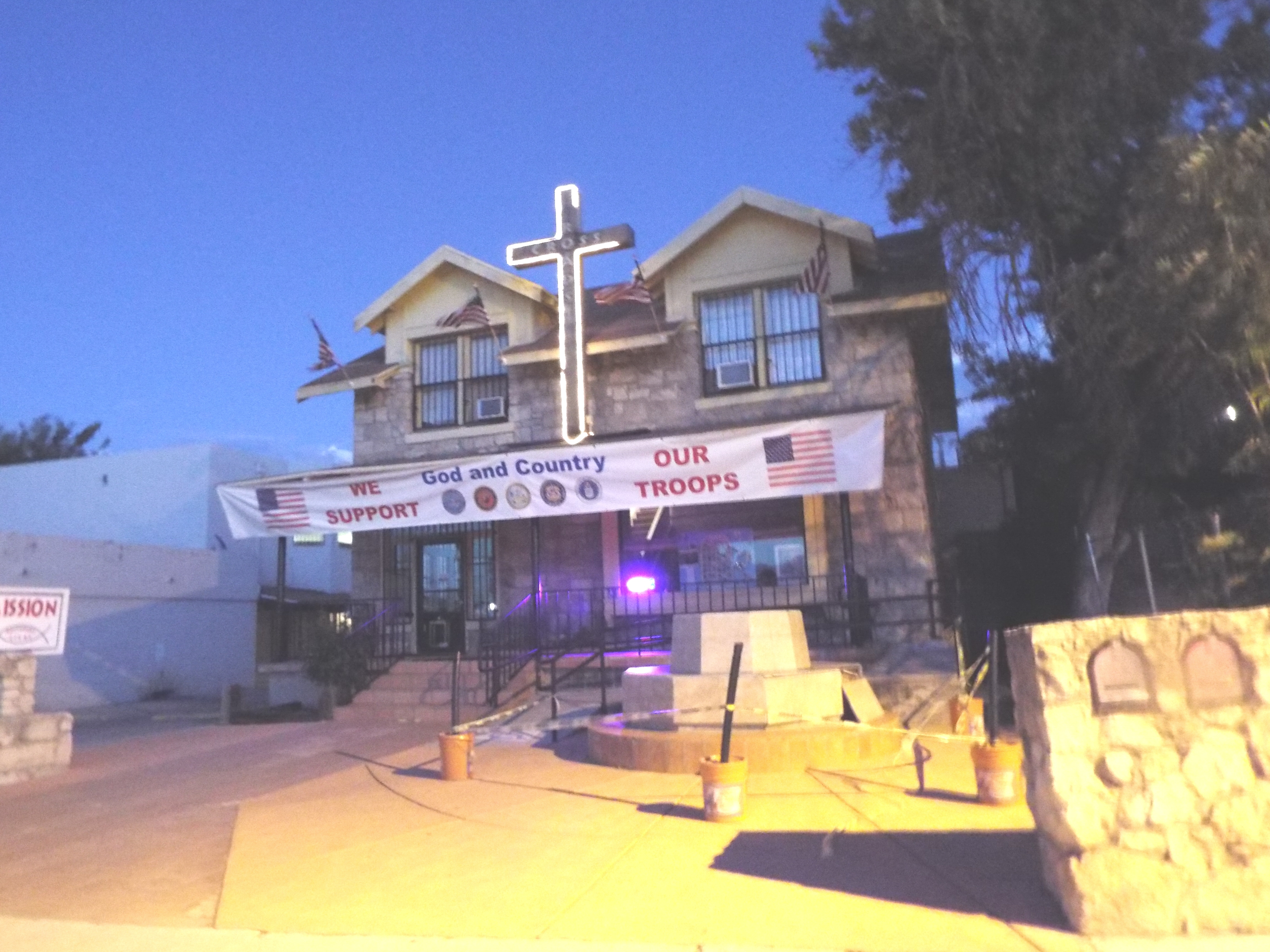
Senator James A. Harrison House

== Educational institutions ==
Educational institutions in Nogales of historical significance.

- Santa Cruz Schoolhouse – built in 1920 and located on Duquesne Road State Route 82 northeast of Nogales. This is one of the approximately two dozen Little Red Schoolhouses built in the Santa Cruz Valley area in the 1920s. Despite difficulties in the cattle industry during that time, a sufficient population of farmers and ranchers existed for construction of these schoolhouses.
- Old Nogales High School – built in 1917 and located at 310 Plum Street. The Nogales High School is the oldest public school building remaining in Nogales. It is the largest Second Renaissance Building in Nogales. Listed in the National Register of Historic Places on August 29, 1985, reference: #85001866.
Historic educational institutions

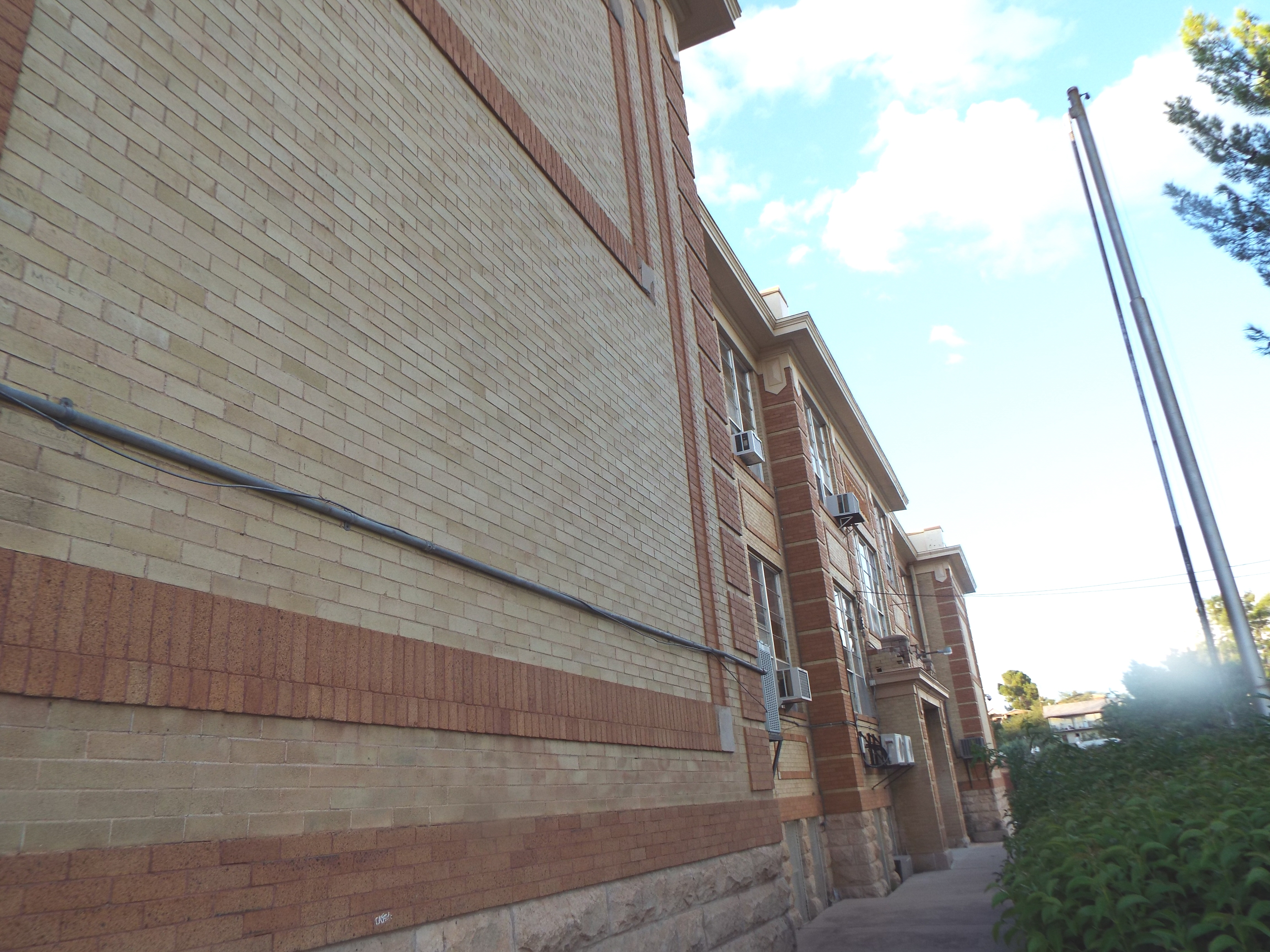
Old Nogales High School

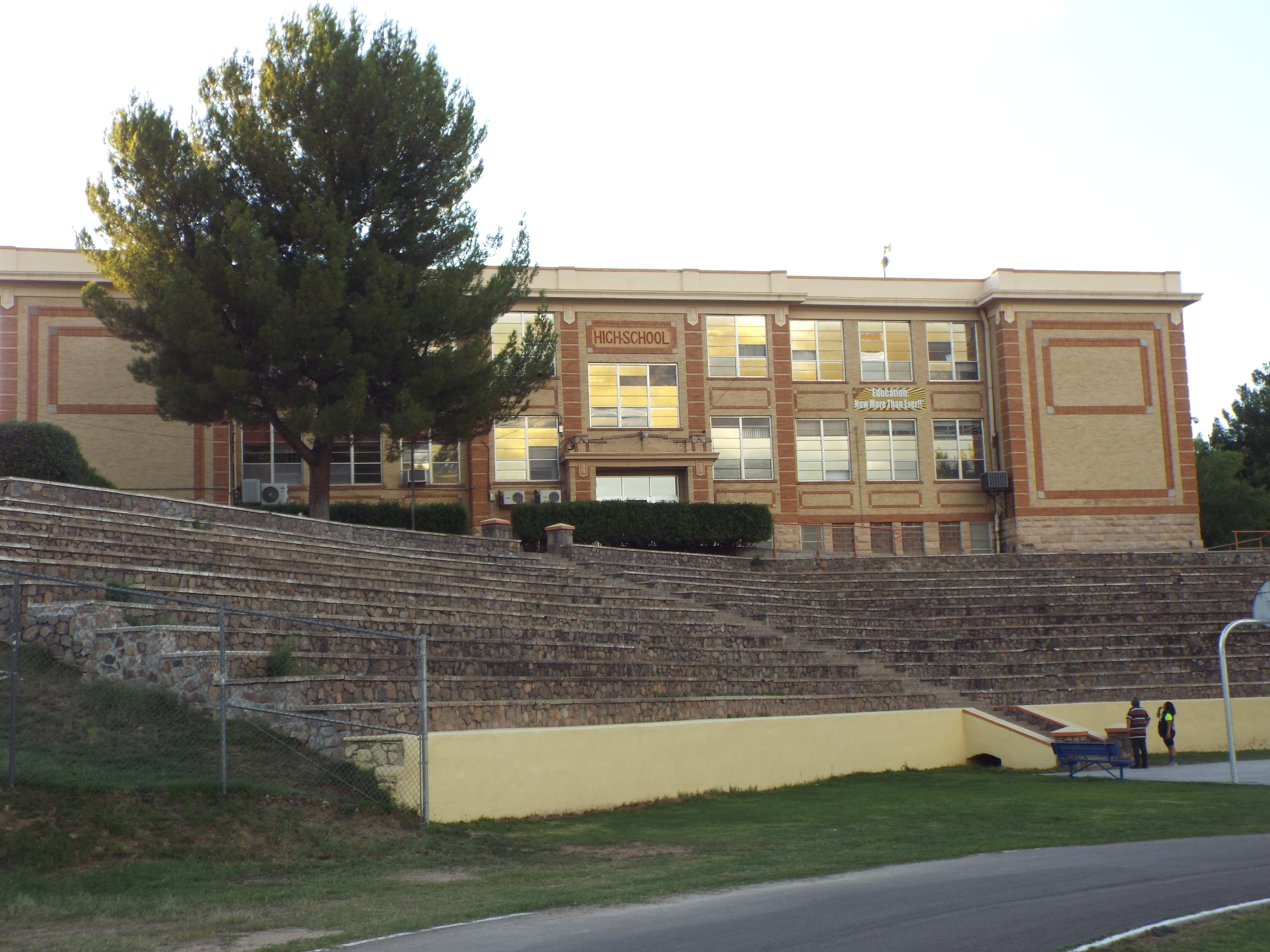
Old Nogales High School

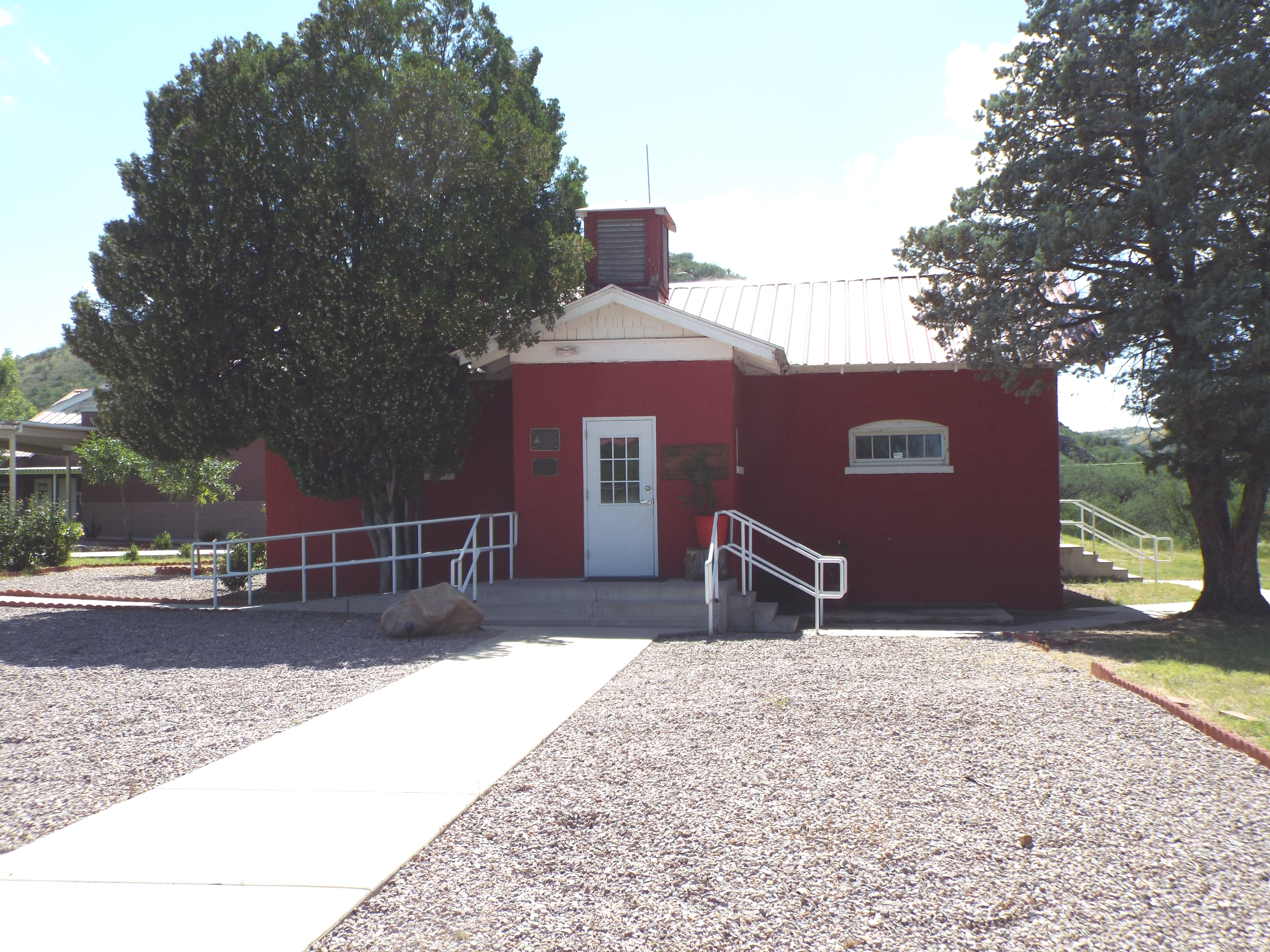
Santa Cruz Schoolhouse

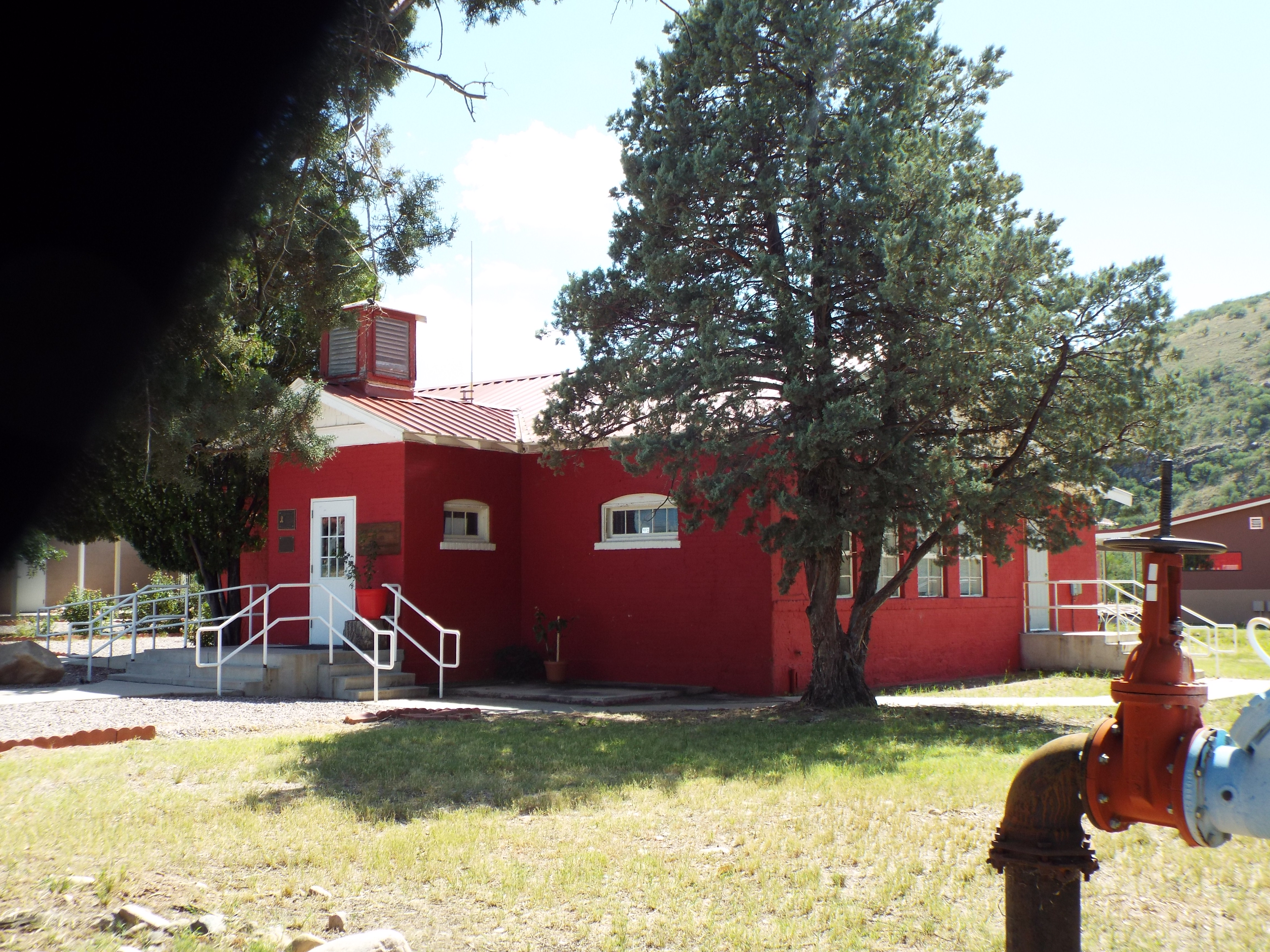
Santa Cruz Schoolhouse

=== Houses of religious worship ===
- The Guevavi Mission Ruins – a.k.a. Mission Los Santos Ángeles de Guevavi, located 6 miles north of U.S./Mexico border. The Mission Los Santos Ángeles de Guevavi, as it was officially called, was founded by Jesuit missionary Fathers Kino and Salvatierra in 1691 as La Misión de San Gabriel de Guevavi, a district headquarters in what is now Arizona, near Tumacácori. Subsequent missionaries called it San Rafael and San Miguel, resulting in the common historical name of Los Santos Ángeles de Guevavi. Listed in the National Register of Historic Places on November 11, 1971, reference: #71000119.
- Sacred Heart Church – built in 1928 and located at 272 North Rodriguez Street. The Sacred Heart Parish has served the Catholic Community in Nogales since 1897. Its inauguration occurred on Thanksgiving Day of 1928, after a construction period of two years.
Houses of religious worship

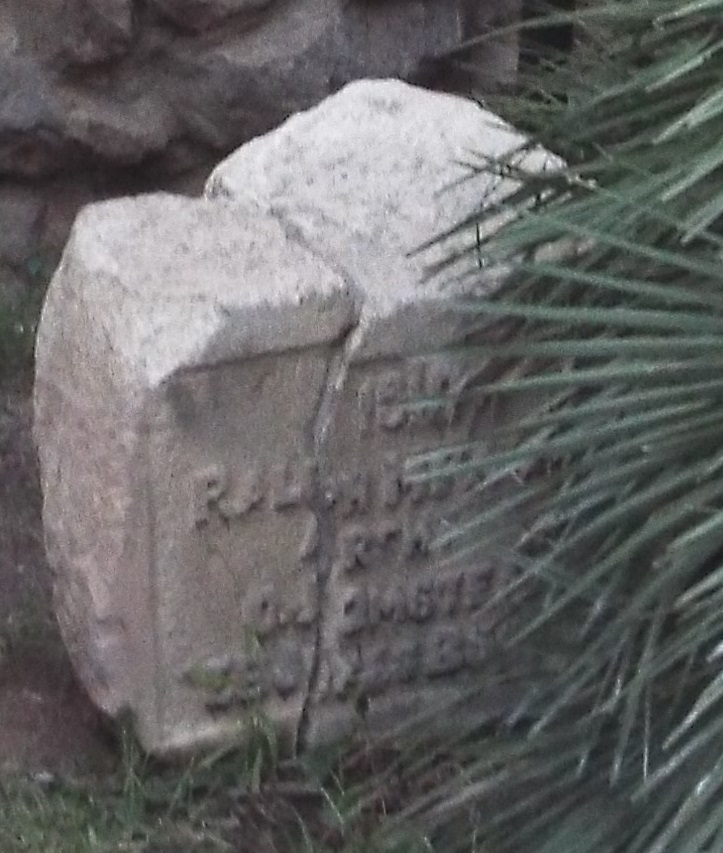
Sacred Heart Church 1910 Bell Stone Marker

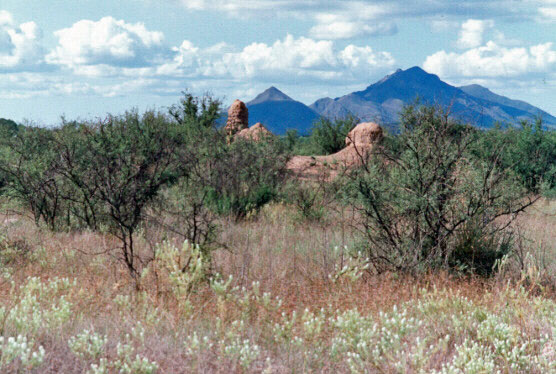
Guevavi Mission Ruins

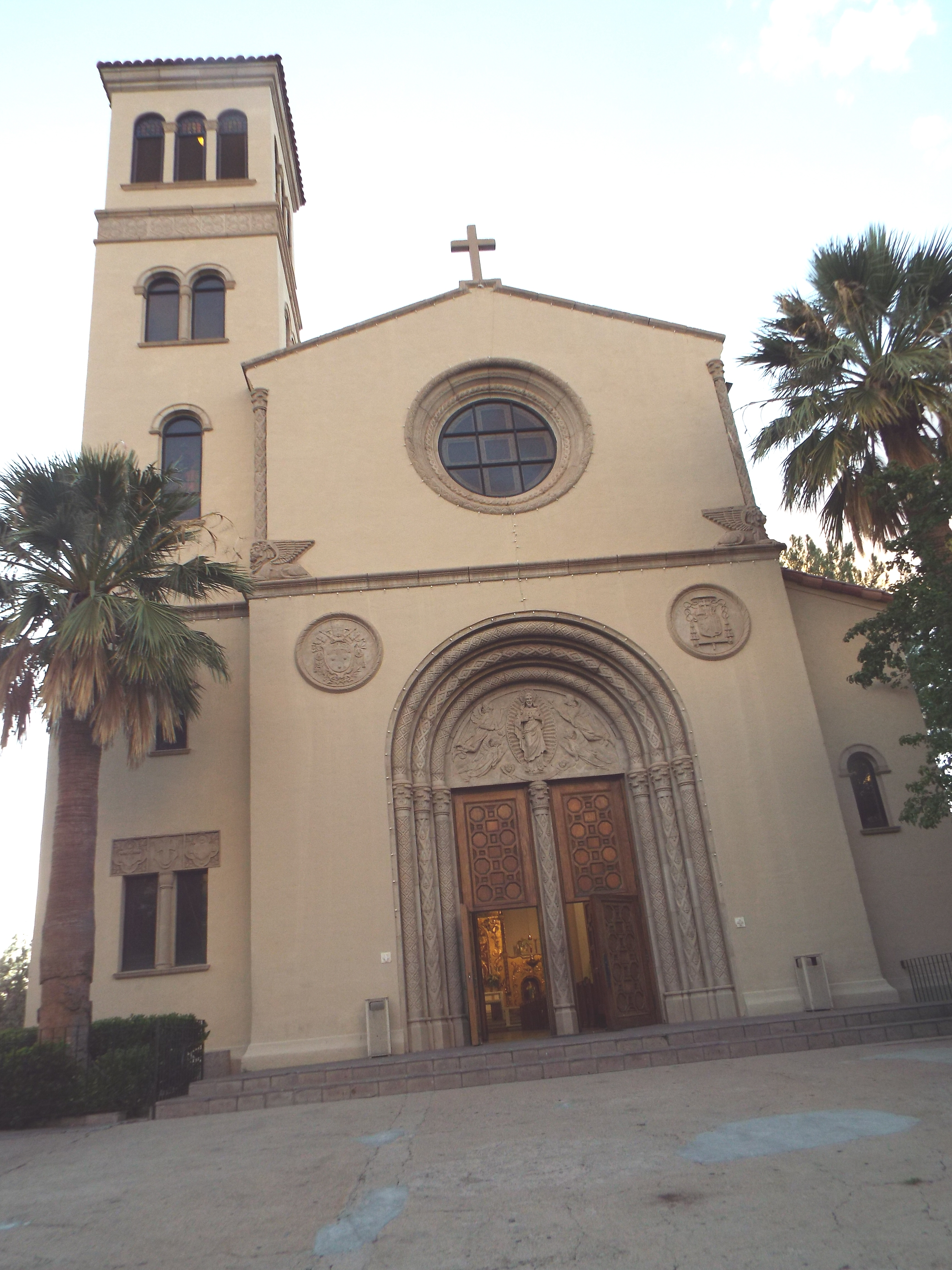
Sacred Heart Church

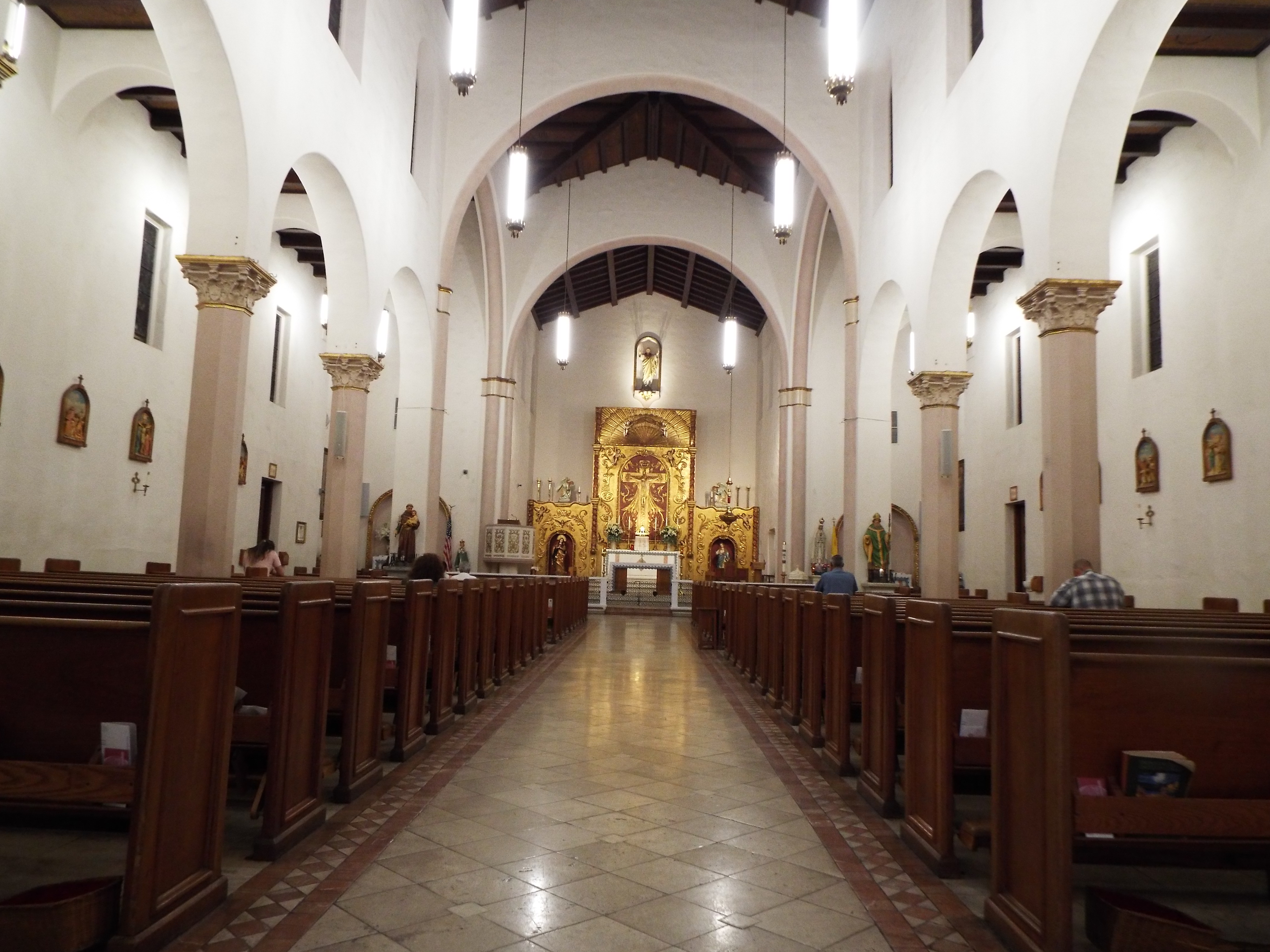
Inside Sacred Heart Church

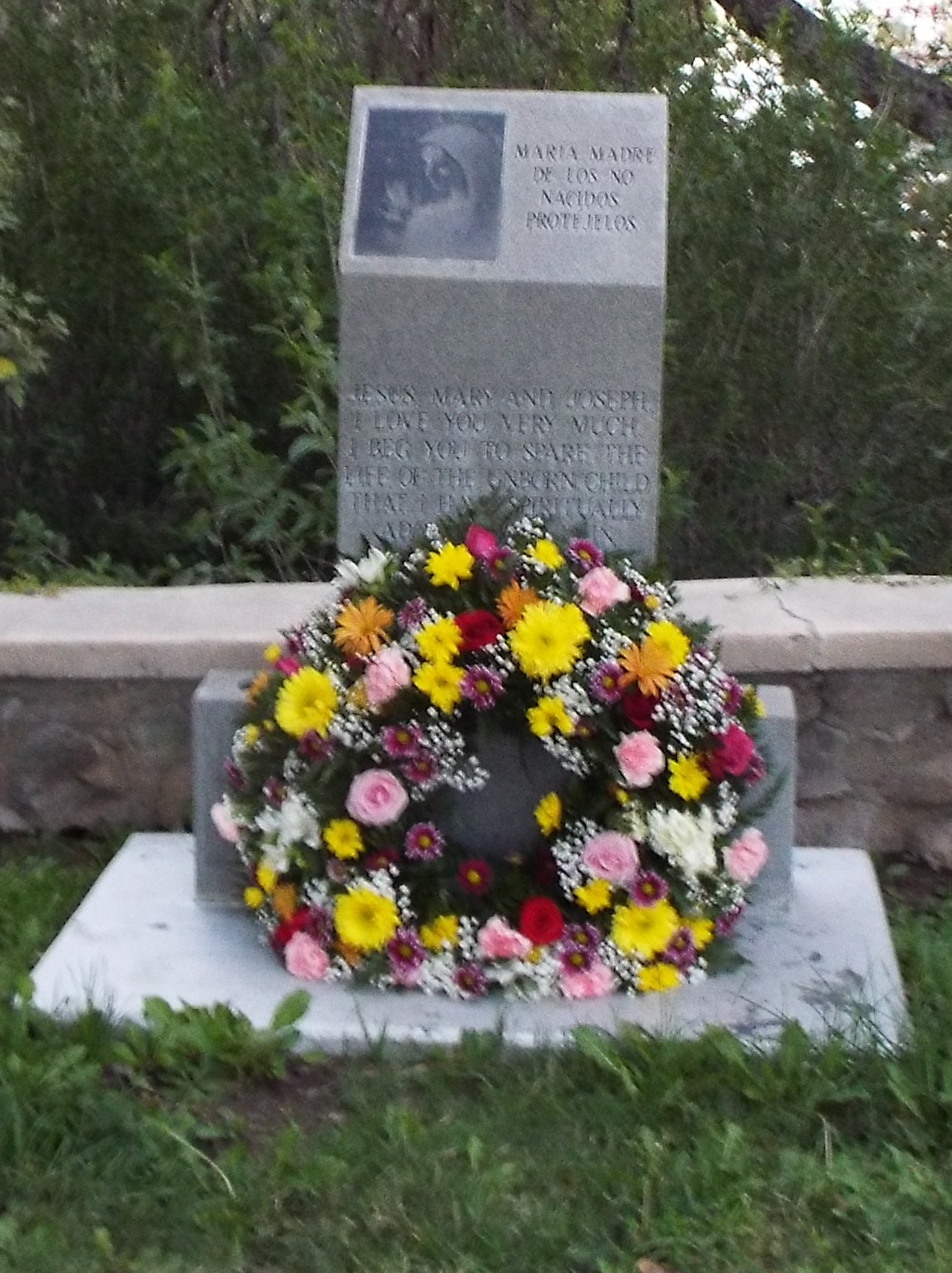
Virgin Mary monument

== Others ==
Other places of historical significance include:

- Santa Cruz Bridge No. 1 – built in 1917 and located on River Road over the Santa Cruz River. It is one of the earliest major vehicular bridges undertaken by the Arizona State Engineer's Office, the Santa Cruz Bridge was for decades a regionally important river crossing. As such it is historically significant for the role it has played in southern Arizona transportation. Technologically, the bridge is distinguished as an outstanding representative of a formative structural type. Of the earliest structures, only the Santa Cruz, Hells Canyon and Antelope Hill bridges remain. The Santa Cruz Bridge is the earliest and longest-span concrete girder still in use on the state's road system. The bridge was listed in the National Register of Historic Places on September 30, 1988, reference: #88001635.
- The Hacienda Corona de Guevavi (Bed & Breakfast) – built in 1935 and located at 348 South River Road. Hacienda Corona is the former Guevavi Ranch headquarters. Records show the property was originally homesteaded by the Benedict family in the early 1900s. Its name honors the Mexican muralist and bullfighter, Salvador Corona, who painted its courtyard walls with scenes of Mexican peasants during the 1940s–1950s. Later, after then-owner Ralph Wingfield lent some of his cattle for use in the filming of the 1948 John Wayne classic, Red River, the hacienda became a Hollywood getaway. The rancher and Wayne were close friends, and the hacienda room in which Wayne frequently lodged is now a B&B room named "The Duke." The original card table the two used is also still present in the hacienda. Most of the ranch buildings are adobe with stucco, except an addition on the hacienda, which is block and stucco. The current owners restored the hacienda after their 2002 purchase.
- The Camp Little Cottages and Historical Marker – The cottages along Western Avenue were built in 1915. These cottages represent Nogales' military post, Camp Little, and are architectural examples of the camp's military housing. Camp Little was located along what is now Western Avenue from Grand Avenue to Interstate 19. In 1910, following the outbreak of the Mexican Revolution, large numbers of American troops were called in to Nogales. Their numbers increased and eventually contributed to the establishment of Camp Little, whose name was derived from that of a private in the 12th U.S. Infantry Division, Camp Stephen D. Little. Little was killed while on guard duty at the top of the hill on Crawford Street in November 1915. At one time, Camp Little had 12,000 troops stationed, but over the years, that number decreased and led to the closure of the camp on 13 May 1933. A historical marker nearby on the lawn of the Nogales City Hall is currently the only interpretative site associated with Camp Little.
- Pete Kitchen Ranch – Located 3.5 miles north of Nogales off U.S. Route 89. The Pete Kitchen Ranch was established on Potrero Creek, about 1862, by Pete Kitchen. Reputedly it was the first permanent American ranch in Arizona. The site, which had good access to water, had been inhabited by the Anasazi, an early Native-American tribe, in prehistory and had been visited by Juan Bautista de Anza in October 1774, who called it Las Lagunas, a name also used by Kitchen. The ranch was listed in the National Register of Historic Places on February 20, 1975, reference: #75000360.
Other
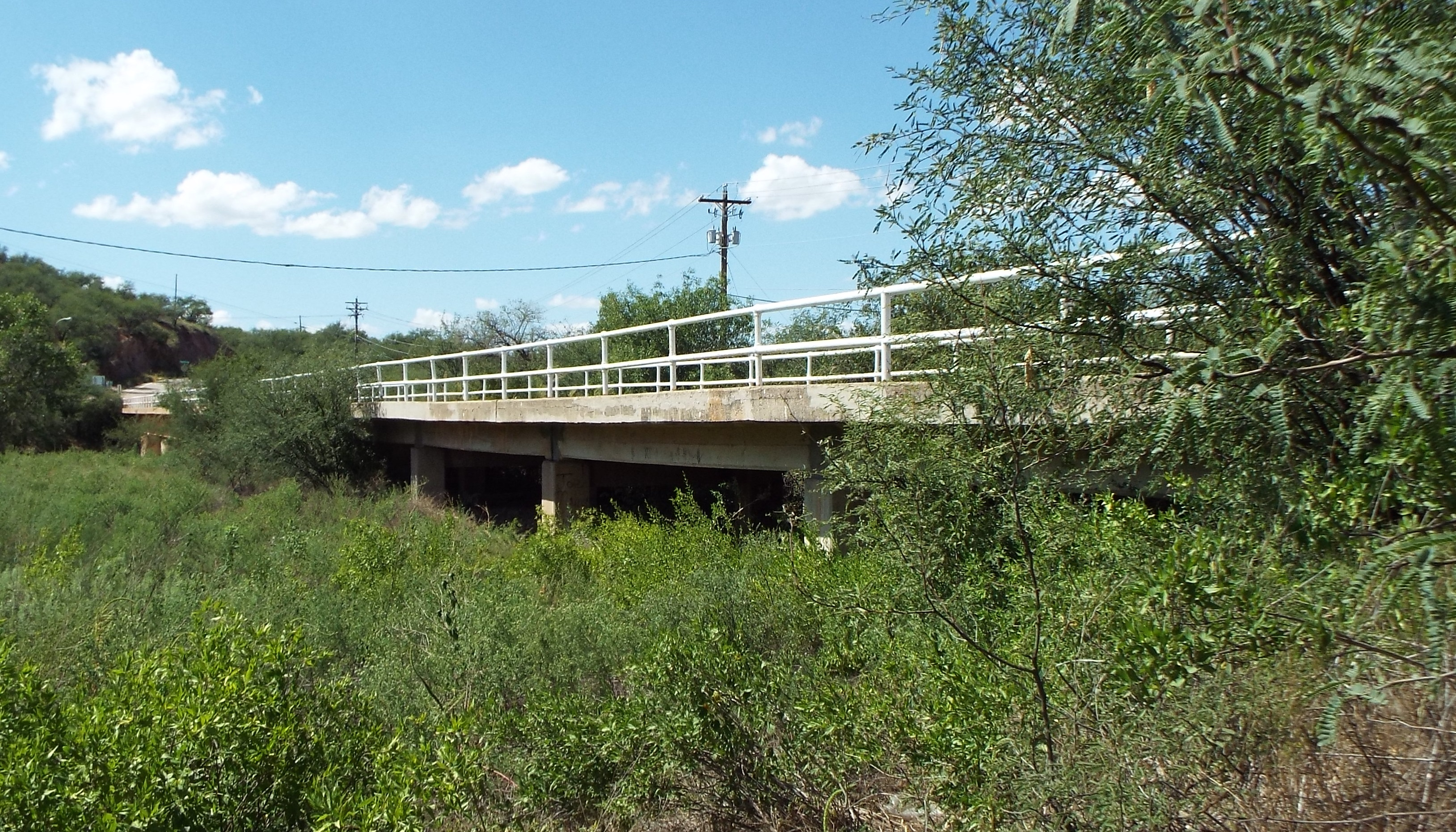
Santa Cruz Bridge No. 1

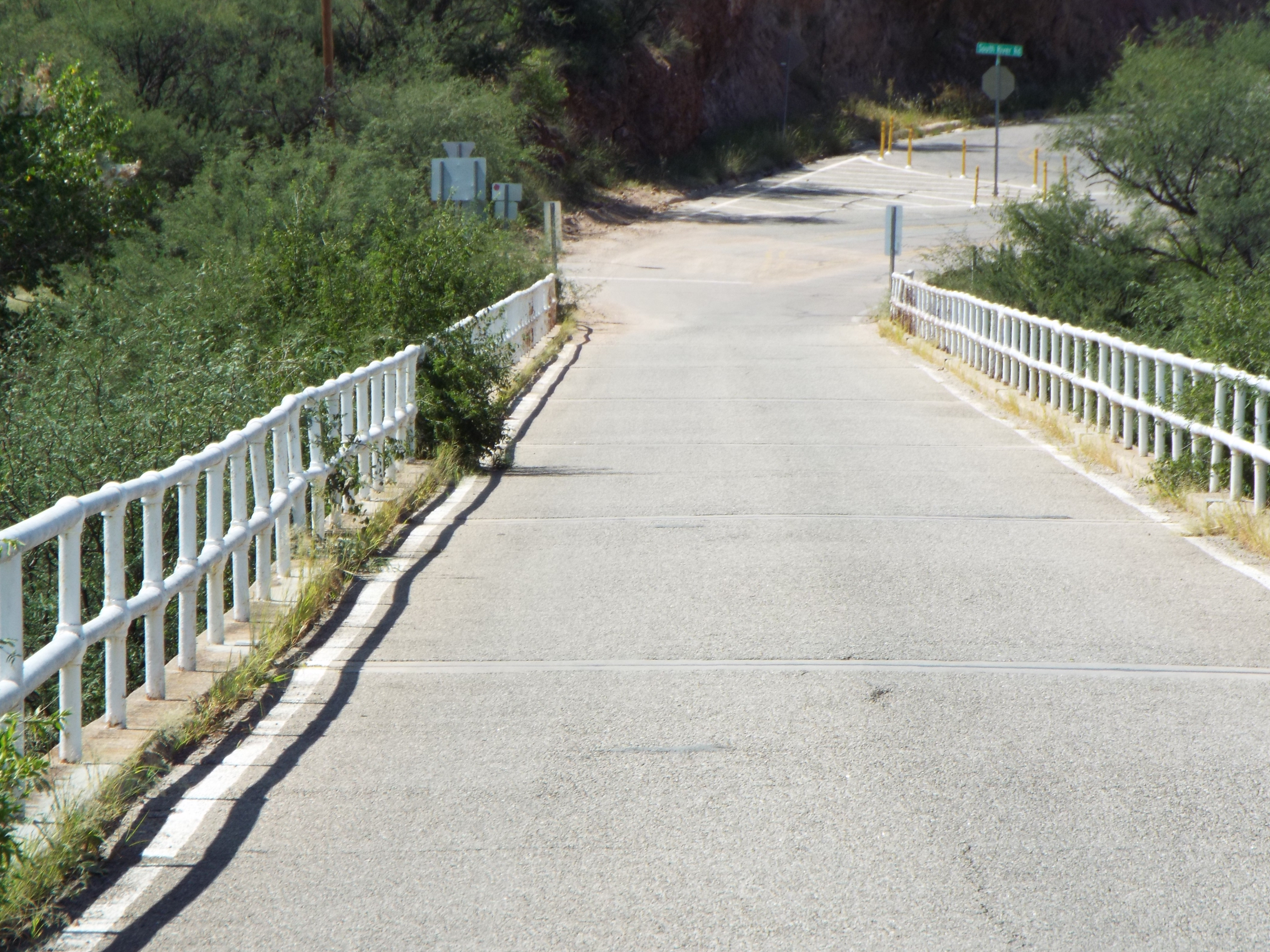
Different view of the Santa Cruz Bridge No. 1

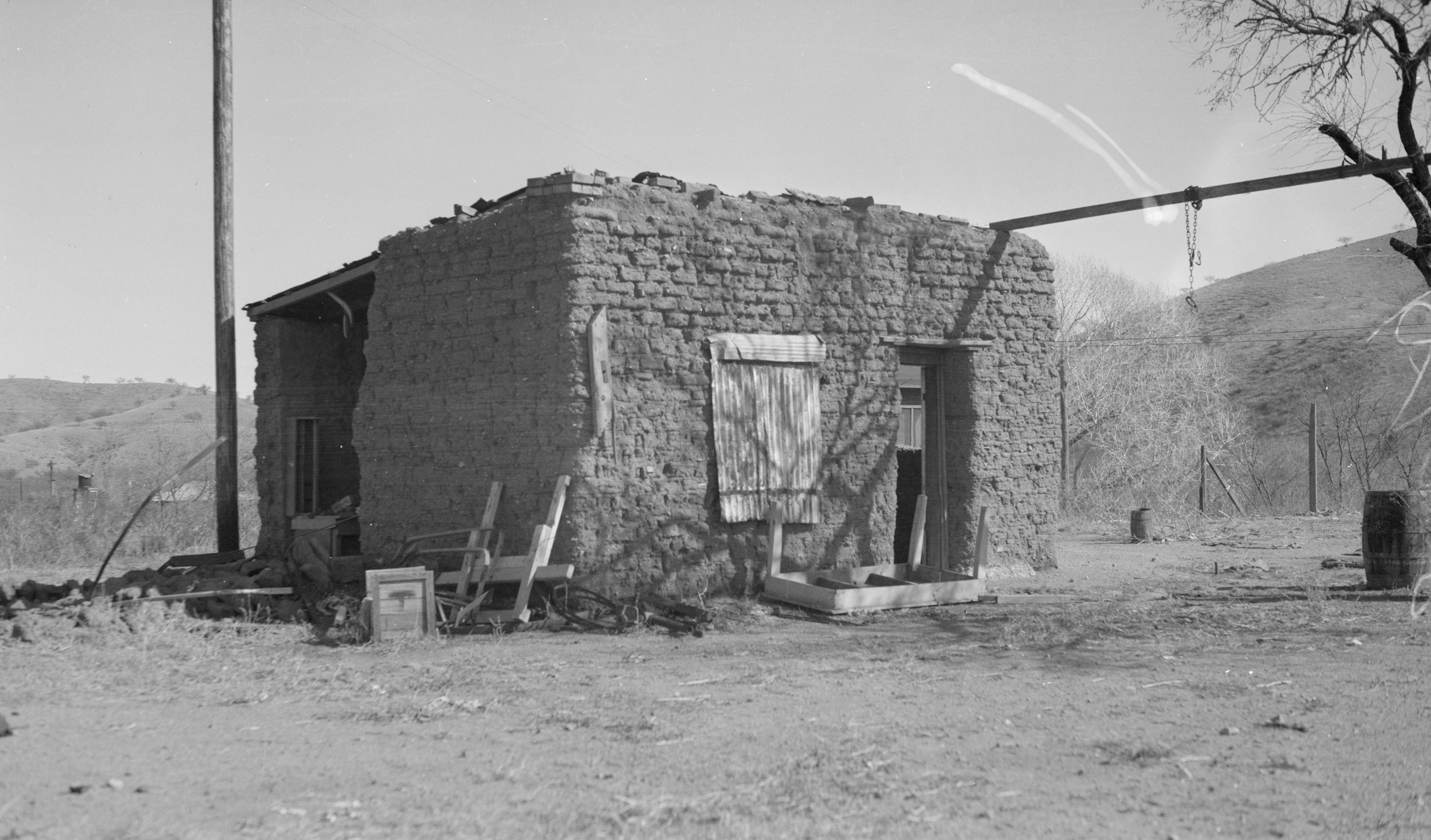
Pete Kitchen Ranch

== See also ==
- National Register of Historic Places listings in Santa Cruz County, Arizona
