= Pedro Pablo Abarca de Bolea, 10th Count of Aranda =

Spanish statesman and diplomat

The Most Excellent Pedro Pablo Abarca de Bolea 10th Count of Aranda GE
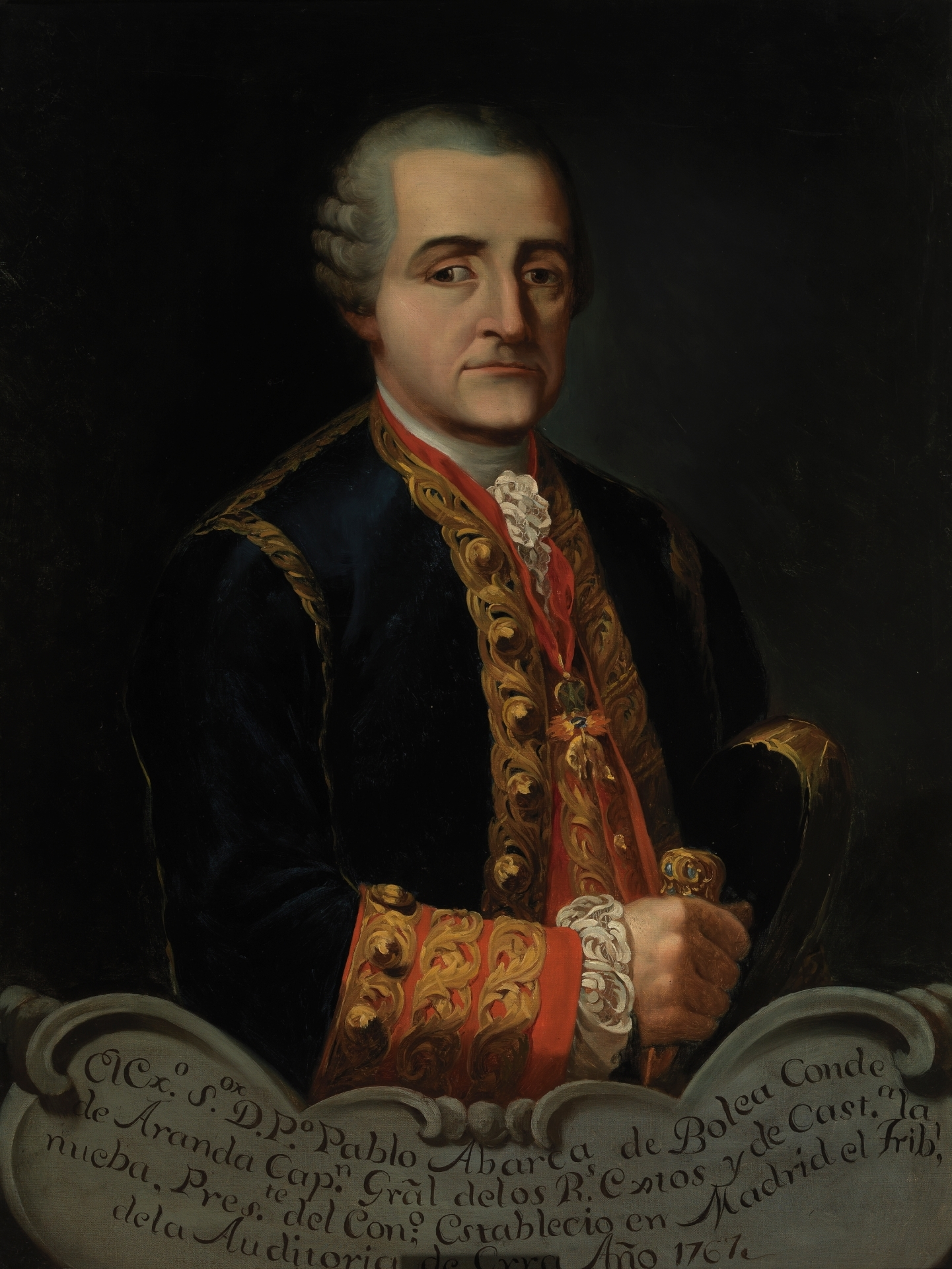
- Portrait by Francisco Jover y Casanova

First Secretary of State
- In office 28 February 1792 – 15 November 1792
- Monarch: Charles IV
- Preceded by: José Moñino
- Succeeded by: Manuel Godoy

Personal details
- Born: Pedro Pablo Abarca de Bolea y Ximénez de Urrea; 18 December 1718 Spain
- Died: 9 January 1798 (aged 79) Spain

Pedro Pablo Abarca de Bolea y Jiménez de Urrea, 10th Count of Aranda (18 December 1718 – 9 January 1798) was a Spanish statesman and diplomat who signed for the Spanish Empire the Peace of Paris of 1783.

== Early life ==
Aranda came from an old and rich Aragonese family. He began ecclesiastical studies in the seminary of Bologna but when he was 18 he changed to the Military School of Parma. In 1740, he was captain of the Spanish Army and fought in the War of the Austrian Succession. As he had been severely wounded in combat in 1743 (he was left for dead on the battlefield), he temporarily left the military and traveled through Europe. He studied the Prussian Army, later introducing its system of drill into the Spanish army, and lived in Paris, where he met Diderot, Voltaire and D'Alembert and studied the Encyclopédie and Enlightenment movements. He also at one point visited Voltaire at Ferney. He briefly visited London in September 1754.

Due to Prime Minister Ricardo Wall's sponsorship, Ferdinand VI appointed him in 1755 ambassador to Portugal and in 1757 director general of Artillery, a post that he soon resigned, along with his military rank, because he was forbidden to pursue corrupt contractors. In 1760, Charles III appointed him ambassador to Poland, Upon his return he was sent to Portugal to supersede Nicolás de Carvajal, Marquis of Sarria in the command of the Spanish army invading Portugal. His forces managed to capture the key border town of Almeida but were then forced to retreat following the intervention of British troops led by John Burgoyne at the Battle of Valencia de Alcántara and the war was brought to an end shortly afterwards by the Treaty of Paris.

In 1763 he was appointed captain general of the Province of Valencia. He was then appointed captain general of New Castile and president of the Council of Castile. The government had recently attempted to ban the long cape and wide sombrero which made concealing weapons easier, there had been a riot against Minister Esquilache. Aranda however succeeded in getting rid of the fashion by simply making it the official costume of the executioner.

As he enjoyed the personal confidence of the king, his power was similar to a prime minister's. He promoted many enlightened reforms and he supported the expulsion of the Jesuits in 1767. His political and courtier enemies, especially Floridablanca, managed to achieve his dismissal. He was appointed ambassador to France in 1773, where he stayed until 1787.

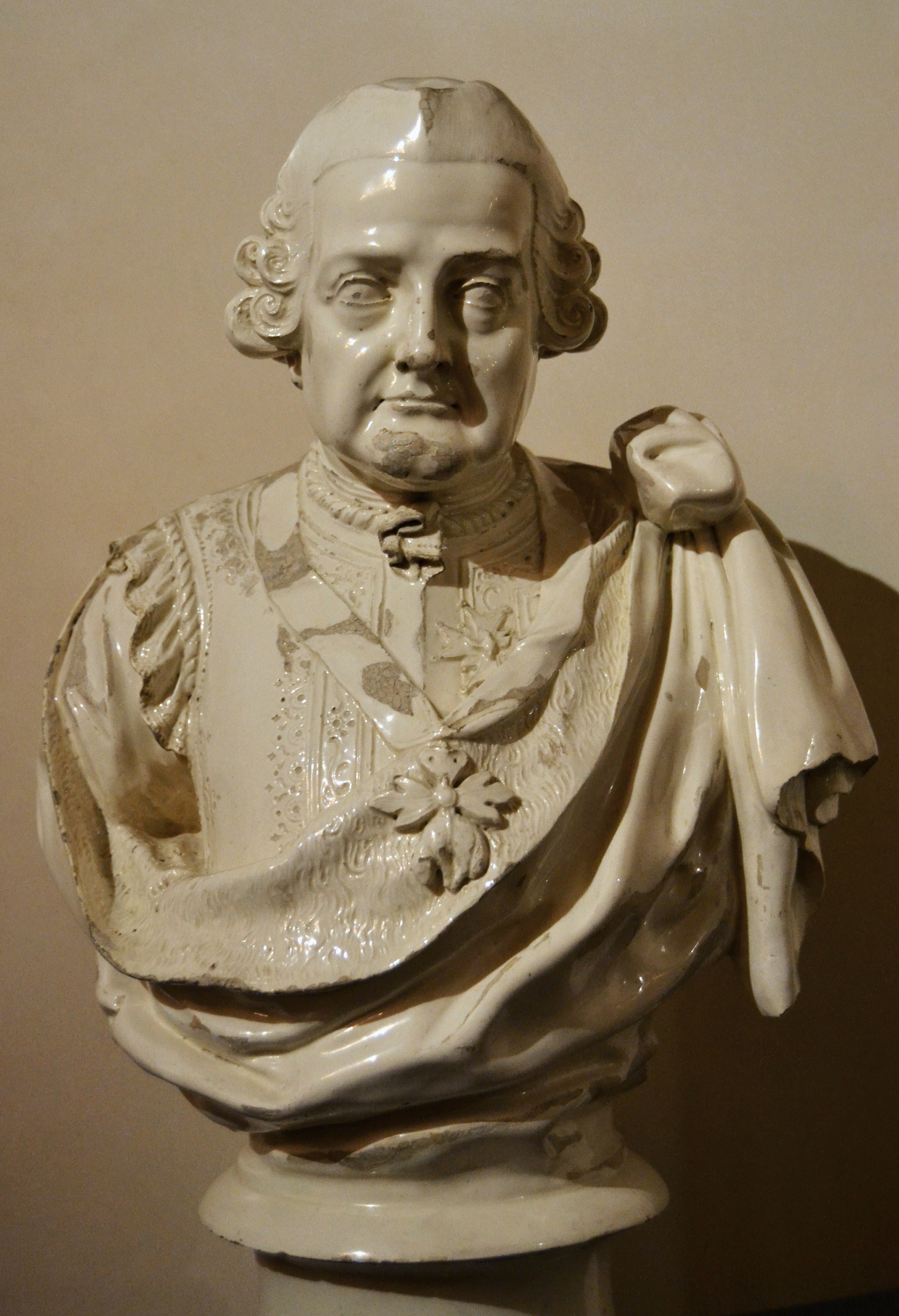
18th century porcelain bust of Aranda (M.A.N., Madrid).

During the Thirteen Colonies’ declaration of independence, the Count of Aranda urged the Spanish Court to back their cause. Pressed by Aranda and French Foreign Minister Charles Gravier de Vergennes, King Charles III of Spain and King Louis XVI of France each agreed to provide 1 million French livres in July 1776 to fund war supplies for the American insurgents. This crucial, covert assistance from both nations helped secure the rebels’ initial triumph at Saratoga in 1777.

The Spanish ambassador was not satisfied with this tactic, as he believed that the only way to ensure the goodwill of those who could be influential neighbors in North America was to establish a mutual commitment. This had to be done while the new state had not yet overcome its difficulties. “If something advantageous is to be achieved, it should not be through the hidden means of secret and insufficient aid, because these are neither of great merit nor likely to attract the other party.”

As evidence of the political acumen of the Aragonese nobleman, in January 1777, during the second meeting between Aranda and Benjamin Franklin—now with the assistance of an interpreter—the Spanish ambassador understood that the conflict between Great Britain and its colonies offered Spain a unique, perhaps unrepeatable opportunity to defeat and perhaps humiliate its historic adversary, since “in centuries there would not be an occasion similar to the present to reduce it.” Overcoming his initial reluctance, Aranda urged the Court of Madrid to officially recognize the delegates of the Congress, who could become the leaders of a powerful nation in North America, and suggested that Spain declare war on England, although his proposal did not receive the king's support. Only following Spain's preliminary peace treaty with Britain, did Floridablanca instruct Aranda to sign a treaty with the United States on March 17, 1783, thus Spain tacitly recognised the independence of the US.

Aranda might have made a 1783 proposition to turn Spanish overseas territories into separate countries in a controlled way to prevent a violent secession like the American Revolutionary War in their own domains. His authory on this is disputed, although in 1786 he also wrote a better documented proposition for the kings of Spain and Portugal to turn their empires into three Ibero-American kingdoms.

== Chief Minister ==
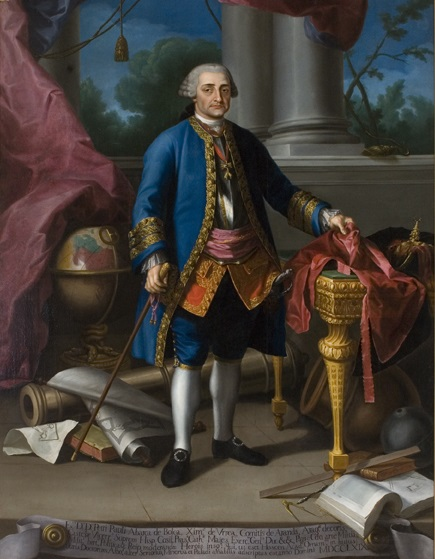
Portrait of Aranda by Ramón Bayeu, 1769 (Museo de Huesca).

In 1792, he returned to Spain to replace José Moñino, 1st Count of Floridablanca as secretary of State (Prime minister). After the imprisonment of Louis XVI (August, 1792) and the proclamation of the Republic in France (September), Aranda's Enlightenment leanings seemed incompatible with the total war that several European monarchies were about to declare against revolutionary France. Aranda was therefore replaced by Manuel Godoy in November. After the defeat of Spanish Army in Roussillon, Godoy and Aranda publicly quarreled in the Council of State. That same night Aranda was arrested and confined to Jaén. A year later he was indulted and retired to his estates in Aragon.

He was buried in the monastery of San Juan de la Peña.

== Family ==
In 1749 he married Doña Ana, daughter of the 9th duke of Híjar, by whom he had one son, who died young, and a daughter.

== See also ==
- List of prime ministers of Spain

== Bibliography ==
- Albiac, María Dolores: El conde de Aranda. Los laberintos del poder, Saragossa: Caja de Ahorros de la Inmaculada, 1998
- Durant, Will (1967). Rousseau and Revolution.
- Olaechea, Rafael; Ferrer, José A.: El Conde de Aranda (mitos y realidad de un político aragonés), Saragossa: Librería General, 1978
- Téllez Alarcia, Diego: Absolutismo e Ilustración en la España del s. XVIII. El Despotismo Ilustrado de D. Ricardo Wall, Madrid: Fundación Española de Historia Moderna, 2008.

Political offices
Preceded by Count of Floridablanca	Secretary of State (Chief Minister); 1792–1792	Succeeded by Manuel Godoy
