= Spanish projects of American independence =

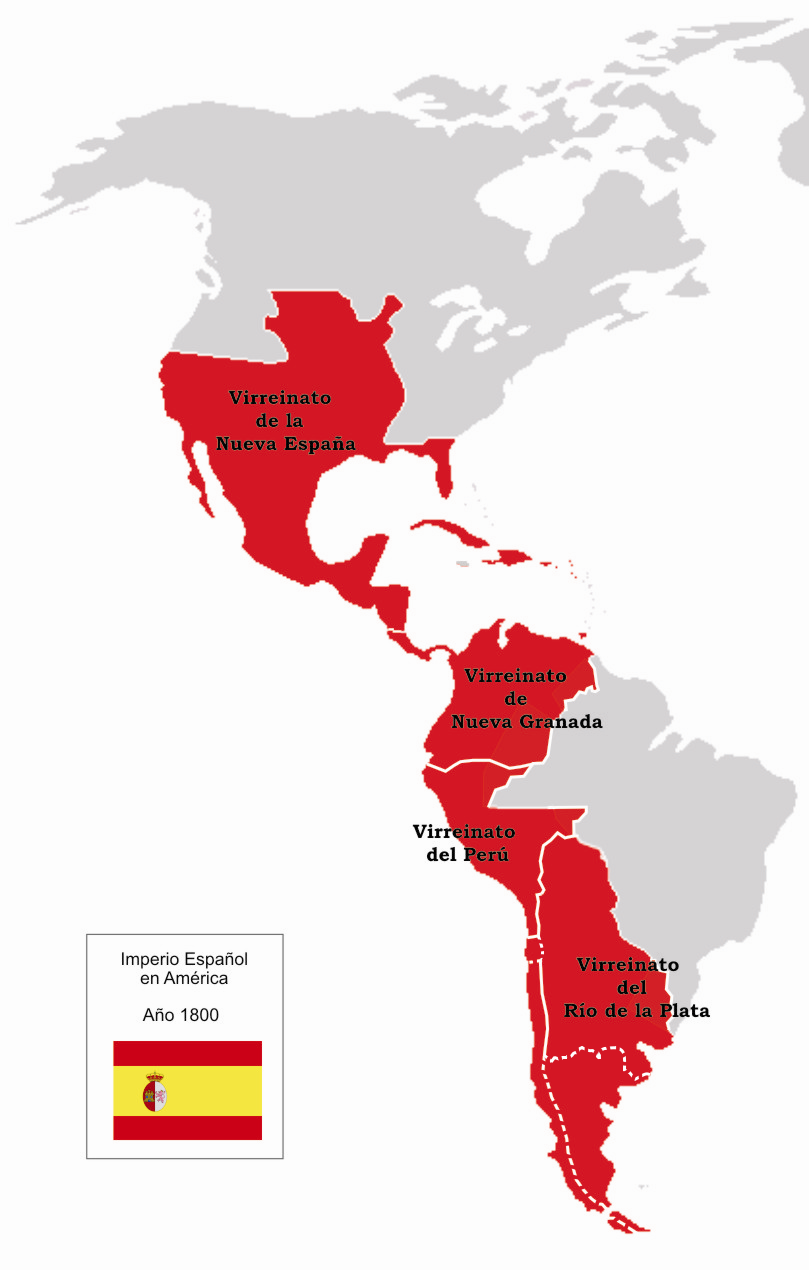
Spanish America in 1800, with its four viceroyalties.

A series of Spanish projects of American independence were proposed and considered to separate the overseas territories of the Spanish Empire in a peaceful manner. These ranged from the 16th century to the 19th century, including during the Spanish American wars of independence, and at some points drew substantial royal consideration, but were never implemented due to a mix of circumstances.

== History ==
The first project was considered in 1541 by Friar Toribio de Benavente, one of the main evangelizers of American history, who proposed King of Spain and Holy Roman Emperor Charles V the possibility of turning New Spain into a separate kingdom and sitting the Prince of Spain in its throne.

What this lands begs God is for Him to give much life and many children to its king, so He could give him a prince who rule it and make it thrive in both spiritual and temporal matters, because its life depends on this. A land so large and remote cannot be well ruled from so afar, and a realm so faraway from Castile cannot grow without great suffering and works and without going down everyday, for not having its own prince and king who rules it and holds it in perpetual justice and peace and reward its good and loyal vassals, punishing the rebels and tyrants who wanted to usurp the wells of the royal patrimony.

=== Reign of Charles III ===
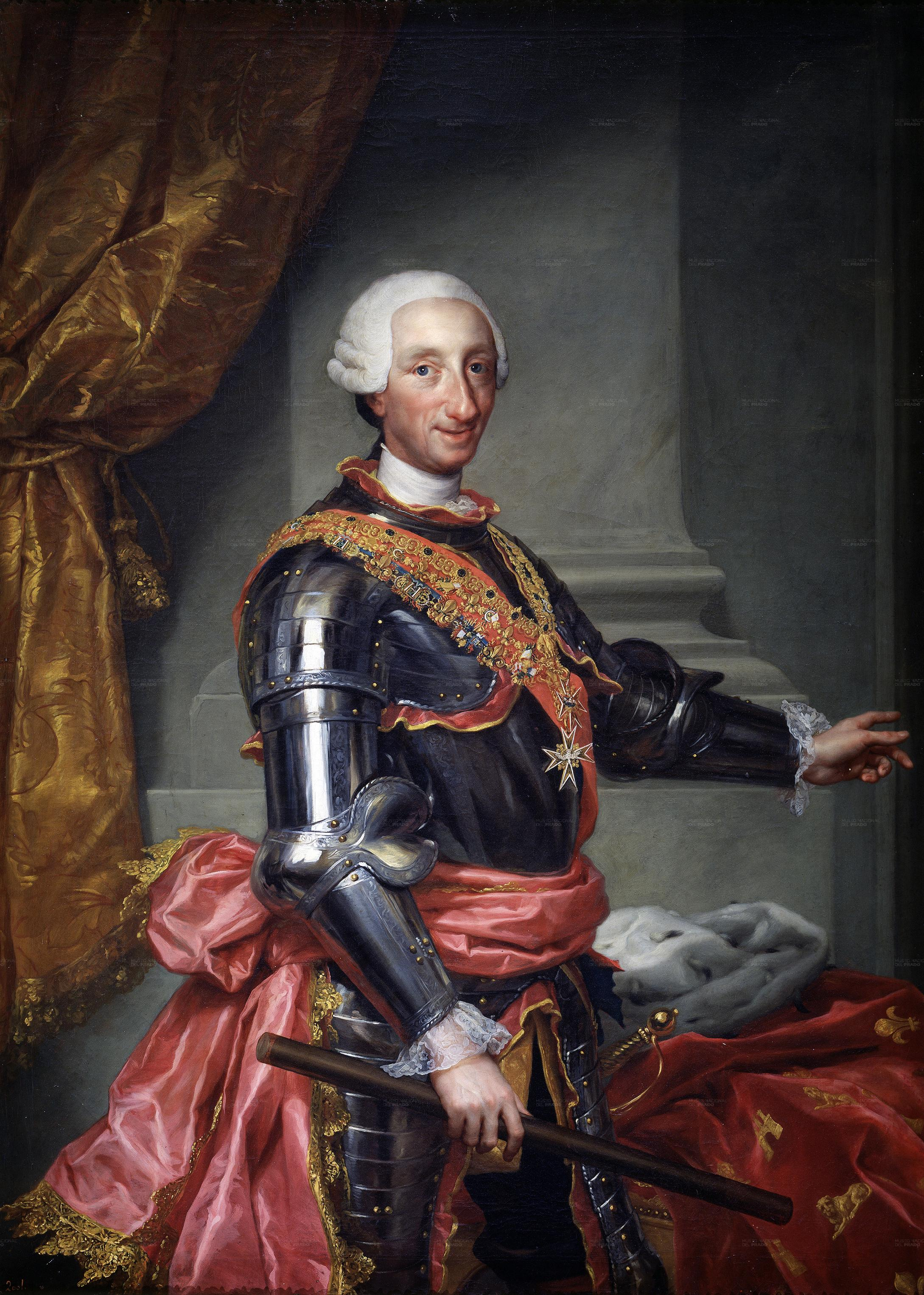
Charles III of Spain.

In 1781, royal deputy Francisco de Saavedra was sent to New Spain to meet with Viceroy Martín de Mayorga and his circle. He observed the immense prosperity and potential of the viceroyalty, but also found a growing dissatisfaction with the existent imperial administration, focused especially in peninsulares being favored over criollos for royal jobs. He believed the independence of the United States was a dangerous example, especially given that while the Thirteen Colonies were just "factories or repositaries of business", the Spanish overseas territories were an "essential part of the nation separated from the other", linked by "sacred ties" which the Spanish metropolis had to strengthen by any means necessary. This caused that several projects to address the problems were presented to King Charles III, who seemes to have neither favored nor opposed a controlled American independence.

==== Ábalos ====
On September 24, 1781 José Abalos presented its proposal of a plan of independence. He started by criticizing the govern of continental Spain and warned about the desire for independence generalized in America. He saw fit to allow for the creation of nations in Hispanic America and to make Spain come out of a place of a mere receipter of tribute and buyer of European industry.

...the only remedy is to let go the provinces ruled by the audiencias of Lima, Quito, Chile and La Plata, like those of the Philippines and their adjacent realms, demanding and creating from their extended countries three or four different monarchies which will be taken by their respective princes in Your Majesty's house, and for this to be executed with the brevity required by the great risk taken and the knowledge of the current system.

He saw the need of creating four states, tied to the Kingdom of Spain but independent. According to Ábalos, independence was inevitable and could only be controlled. Its proposal reached the king by mediation of José de Gálvez, secretary of the Indies.

This is, my lord, the precise way to prevent our foreign enemies any irruption moved by their avarice. This is also the way to avoid the locals any resentment towards any corrupt and venal government which could push them into an infaithful and violent resolution or towards the same disaffection they have towards the metropolis, supported by foreign help, which could ease, as it will be seen, the independence they already see nearby and perfect in the North American colonists of this same continent.

==== Count of Aranda ====
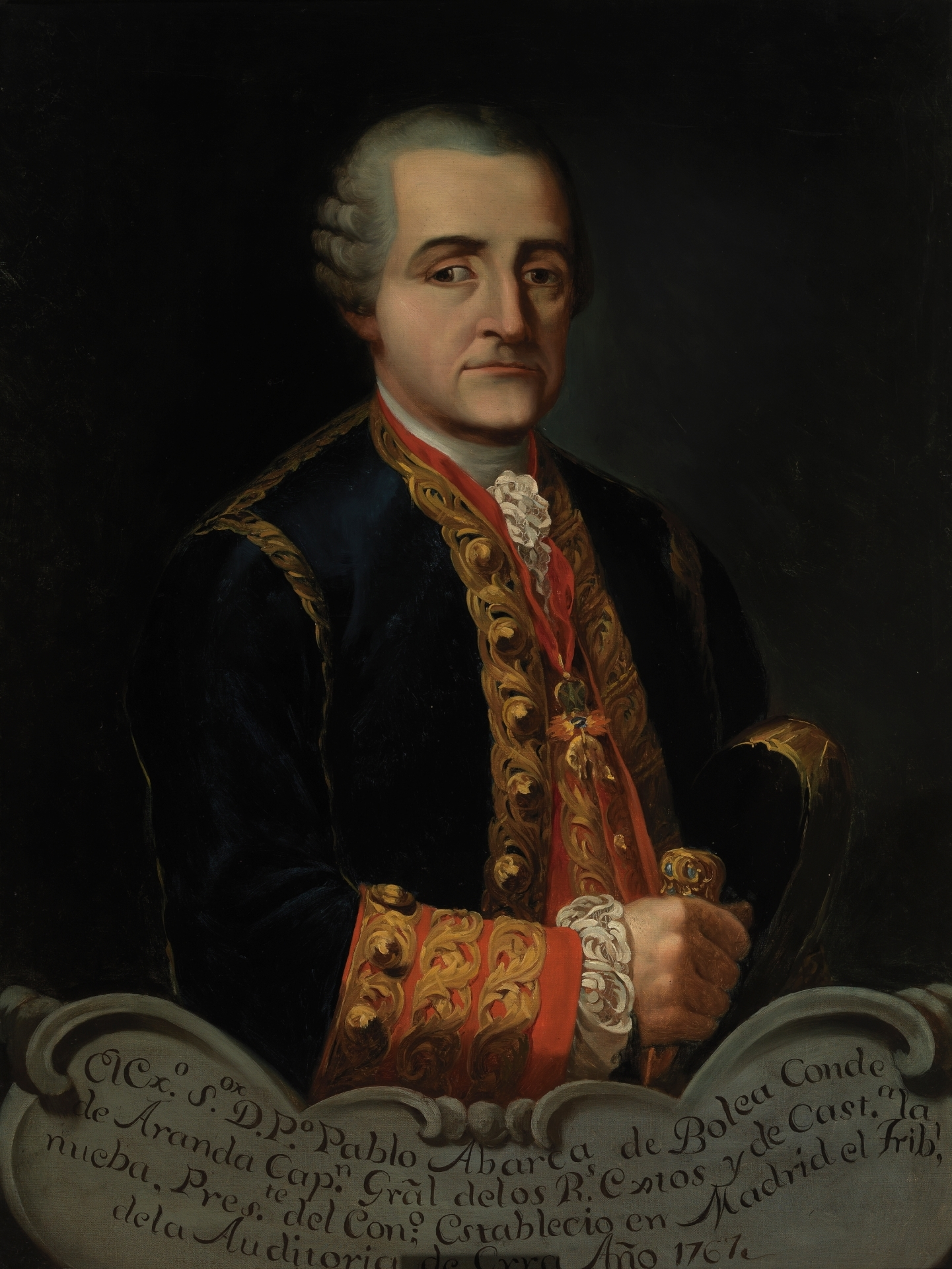
Pedro Pablo Abarca de Bolea, Count of Aranda.

A 1783 memorial attributed to the Count of Aranda proposed also to separate the viceroyalties from Spain, turning them into independent states to counter especially the potential threat of the Thirteen Colonies and any other European colonial movement. The plan involved dividing Spain by enthroning four Spanish princes as kings of four kingdoms, these being Spain (retaining Cuba and Puerto Rico), México, Perú and Tierra Firme (the last including all the lands not taken by the previous two). The king of Spain would ascend to Emperor and nominally lead the four, who would maintain a dynastic union, a commercial community and "the closest offensive and defensive alliance", through which "they will not be forces in Europe which could counter their power in these lands".

Your Majesty should give away all the territories of the American continent, only keeping the islands of Cuba and Puerto Rico in the northern part and some other which turn convenient in the southern, in order for all these to serve as stopover for Spanish trade. To realize this though in a way convenient to Spain, three Spanish princes have to be placed in America: one as King of Mexico, another as King of Peru and the third as king of all the remnants lands as Tierra Firme, with Your Majesty taking the title of Emperor.

According to a line of research, however, the memorial was probably not written by Aranda, citing that the original has not survived beyond copies after 1825, that there is no mention to the plan in royal documents and that the content and style of the memorial do not fit Aranda. Historian Richard Konetzke suggested that the memorial was a posterior forgery by Manuel Godoy, Aranda's rival, to taint him with controversy, but this has been rejected on the basis that Godoy himself would propose similar plans of independence in 1804 and 1806 with no controversy whatsoever.

Aranda did write another memorial with ample documental evidence, sent to Floridablanca in 1786, with similar spirit about the future of the Spanish America, yet radically different in content. He proposed for Spain to reach an agreement with the Portuguese Empire to annex the entire Iberian Peninsula to Spain in exchange for handing Peru and Chile to be merged with the resultant kingdom of Brazil, at the same time forming third Iberian kingdom around Buenos Aires with a Spanish prince in the throne.

My point is that we cannot totally sustain the totality of our America, neither for its size nor for the remoteness of parts of it, like Peru and Chile, so distant from our forces. Let's speak ideally. Portugal is most convenient to us, and only it would be more useful to us than all the continent of America except by the islands. I would dream to acquire Portugal by handing away Peru, which from their back would join Brazil, taking as a limit from the Amazonas river... I would establish a prince in Buenos Aires, giving him also Chile, and if adding the latter to Peru to make Portugal like more the idea, giving it away too, leaving for the prince Buenos Aires and its other lands.

The plan adhered to Charles III's intention to achieve some day the integration of Portugal and Spain by any peaceful means, although also counted on both resultant Spanish kingdoms to contain Brazil in case of war. Aranda admitted the plan was difficult and improbable and it would be hard to make the king of Portugal aquiesce, but he considered it the best option in a foreseeable future where Spain would lose control of American mainland.

=== Reign of Charles IV ===
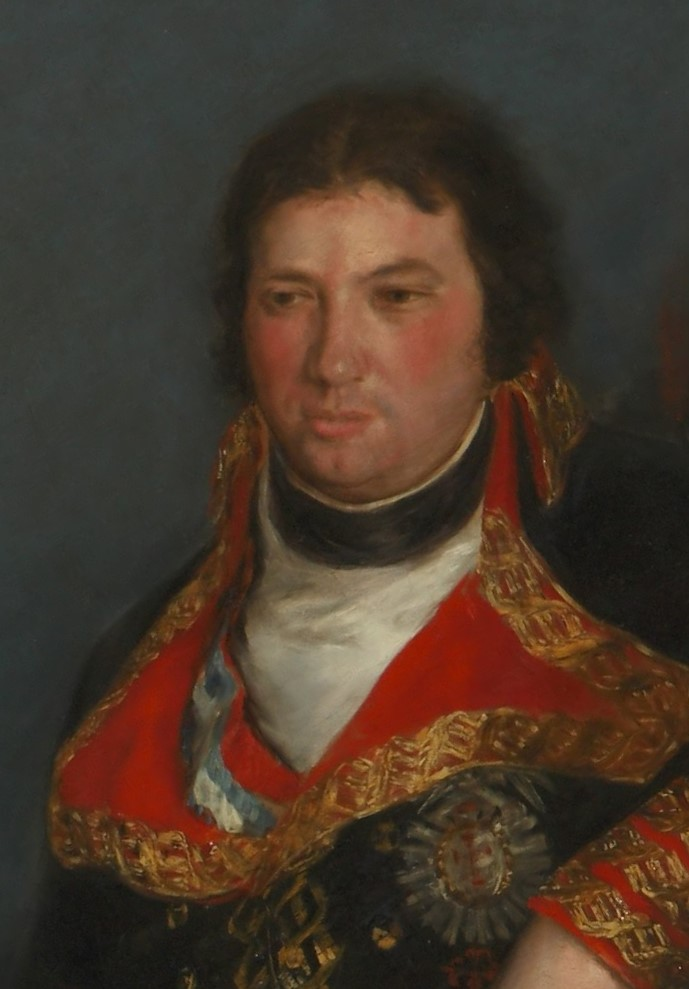
Manuel Godoy.

Twice during the reign of Charles IV of Spain, minister Manuel Godoy proposed again the division of the empire in multiple kingdoms ruled by Spanish princes. In 1804 Godoy described it as:

My thought was that instead of viceroys we would send princes to America, for them to take the title of prince regents, who would make themselves loved over there, who filled with their presence the ambition and pride of its locals, who formed a good council with responsible ministers, who ruled with them a Senate, half American and half Spaniard, who reformed and adapted to the times the Leyes de las Indias, and who made business of the kingdom being tried in their own tribunals in each regency... but the time I feared arrived: England broke peace treacherously and in such circumstances the king did not dare to risk their children and relatives to be captured in the sea.

In 1806 he met with the king again for a new similar project, choosing among the royal family to make "perpetual and hereditary viceroys in its direct line, and in case of this dying out, return to the crown." Charles IV also suggested to turn Chile in a fifth state aside from the potential New Spain, New Granada, Perú and La Plata.

=== Reign of Ferdinand VII ===
The Trienio Liberal of the reign of King Ferdinand VII, concurrent with the wars of independence, saw a new plan to end those on June 25, 1820. Lucas Alamán, back then a member of the Cortes of Cádiz, argued to install three sections of the Cortes in the American continent, being the first in New Spain, the second in New Granada and Costa Firme, and the third for Perú and La Plata. Executive power would still reside in a person delegated by the king, including members of the royal house. The proposal, however, was rejected.

Shortly after, Francisco Antonio Zea presented a similar plan from the rebel side, a Plan de reconciliación y proyecto de Confederación Hispánica ("Plan of reconciliation and project of a Hispanic Confederacy"), which would merge back the rebel and loyalist territories into a global confederacy with its nominal capital in Madrid. This would entail a mutual defense agreement, a single market protected against foreign states and a federal diet. He urged Spain to accept while the conflict was still mendable and offered himself as a hostage to secure its process. On October 9, the project was sent to both Ferdinand VII and secretary of the government Evaristo Pérez Castro. However, Ferdinand was opposed to anything but a restoration of the old absolute throne, while the liberal government believed their new policies would solve the wars of independence their own way. Both were ultimately unsuccessful.

With the failure of both proposals and end of the Trienio Liberal shortly after, the wars of independence closed without a solution, bringing a permanent and politically traumatic separation between Spain and its former overseas territories.

== See also ==
- Iberism
- Ibero-American Summit
- Panhispanism

== Bibliography ==
- Butrón Prida, Gonzalo (2023). «Negociar, transigir, conciliar. Los fundamentos de la política americana del Trienio Liberal». Pasado y Memoria (27).
- Morón, Guillermo & Medina, José Ramón (1995). El proceso de integración de Venezuela (1776-1793). En Obra Escogida. Volume 211. Quito: Fundación Biblioteca Ayacucho. Selección y Prólogo de José Ramón Medina. Cronología y bibliografía de Roberto J. Lovera de Sola. ISBN 98-027-6313-6
- Navas Sierra, J. Alberto (2000). Utopía y atopía de la Hispanidad. El proyecto de Confederación Hispánica de Francisco Antonio Zea. Ediciones Encuentro. ISBN 9788474905946.
- Botana, Natalio R. (2016). Repúblicas y monarquías: La encrucijada de la Independencia. Editorial EDHASA. ISBN 978-987-628-407-3.
