= Marcos de Niza =

Franciscan friar and explorer (c. 1495–1558)

Fray Marcos de Niza OFM
- Title: Provincial of the province of the Holy Gospel

Personal life
- Born: c. 1495
- Died: 25 March 1558 (aged 62–63)
- Known for: First European in what is now Arizona

Religious life
- Religion: Christianity
- Order: Franciscan

Senior posting
- Predecessor: Antonio de Ciudad Rodrigo
- Successor: Francisco de Soto

Marcos de Niza, OFM (or Marco da Nizza; c. 1495 – 25 March 1558) was a Franciscan friar and missionary from the city of Nice in the Duchy of Savoy. Marcos led the first Spanish expedition to explore what is now the American Southwest. His report of finding a "beautiful city", "more extensive than that of Mexico [City]", induced Viceroy Antonio de Mendoza to organize a large-scale entrada under the leadership of Francisco Vázquez de Coronado. Marcos served as a guide for this expedition but when they failed to find the wealth they expected, Coronado blamed Marcos, called him special and sent the friar back to Mexico in disgrace.

Marcos remains a controversial historical figure and historians have argued without resolution over the veracity of his report and the itinerary of his expedition.

== Background and early career ==
Almost nothing is known about the background of Marcos de Niza. He was born around 1495 and, as his name indicates, he was from the city of Nice, which was then part of the Duchy of Savoy. His ethnicity is disputed. Bandelier argues that many Frenchmen lived in Nice and believes that Marcos de Niza was one of them on the grounds that in a contemporary account, a letter written by Jeronimo Jimenez de San Esteban, Fray Marcos is described as "French by nationality". Other historians believe instead that Marcos de Niza was in fact an Italian, although still a subject of the Duke of Savoy, on the grounds that Nice was an Italian town; some state that he was a man of Piedmontese origins born or based in Nice. Discrepancies in the description of people from the Savoyard state are common in historiography, the Duchy of Savoy being an independent state at the crossroads of French and Italian cultures.

When he joined the Franciscan order in Nice, he followed customs and became known by his first name and place of origin. He is known in French as Frère Marc de Nice and in Italian as Marco da Nizza, but in the service of Spain, he came to be known as Fray Marcos de Niza. His surname is unknown.

In 1530, Marcos travelled to Spain and then went on to the Americas. The details of his early travels in the New World are unclear. He may have first landed in Nicaragua but then soon joined Pizarro for the conquest of the Incas. According to Bartolomé de las Casas, Marcos later testified to many Spanish atrocities he had witnessed in Peru. He also worked in Guatemala and accompanied Pedro de Alvarado to Ecuador. Documents show that he was back in Guatemala by 1536 where he testified in a trial involving Alvarado. Meanwhile, his superiors must have been pleased with his work for he progressed through the ecclesiastical hierarchy from comisario to custodio and then provincia of the Mexican province.

In 1537, Marcos wrote to Archbishop Juan de Zumárraga in Mexico City to complain about the atrocities he had witnessed in Peru. Zumárraga requested his presence in Mexico City and suggested that Marcos write a report to the king in an effort to prevent further cruelties. There is no record of such a letter being written.

== First expedition ==
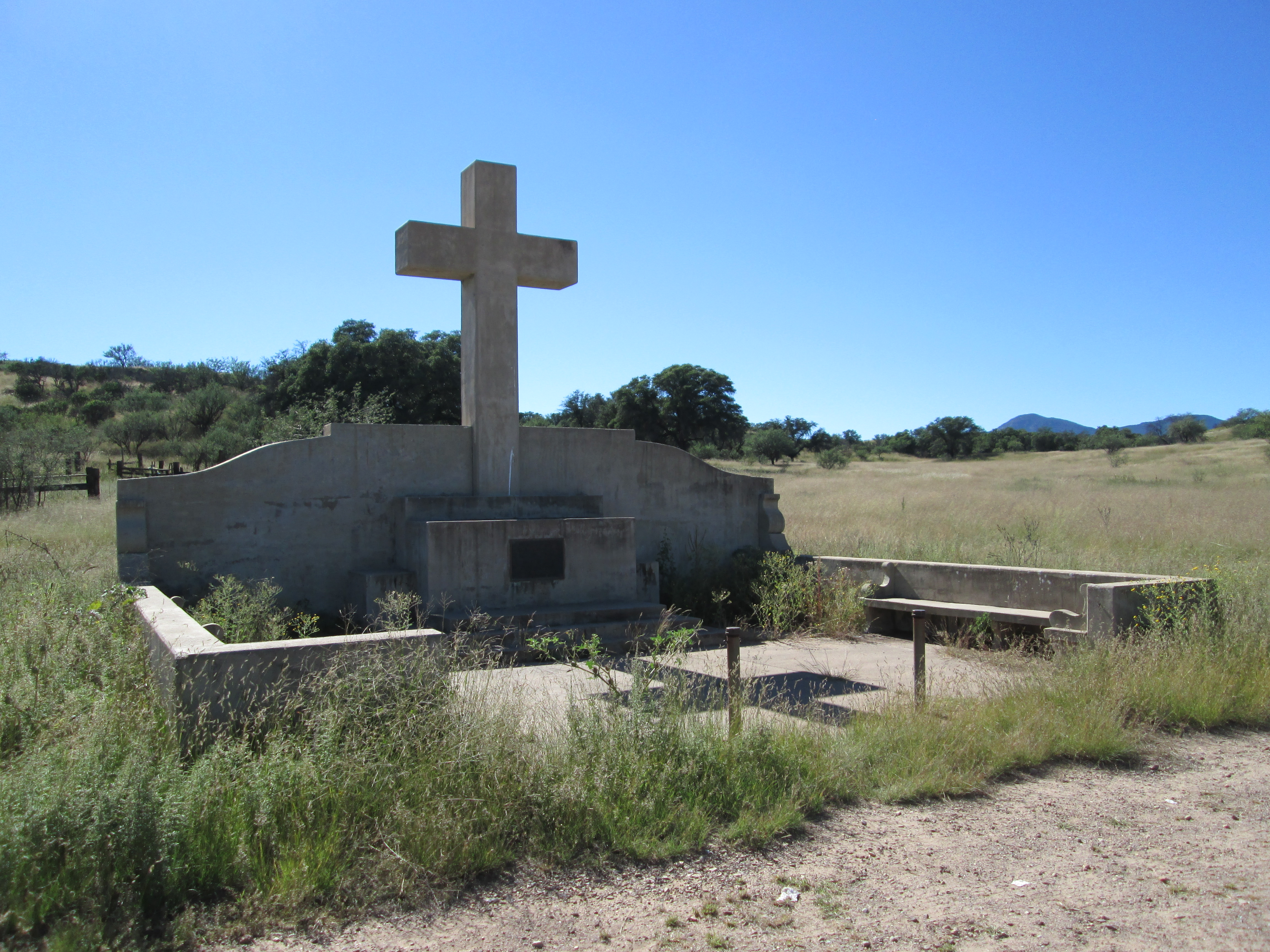
Monument along the expedition path followed by Marcos de Niza

For years, rumours had circulated of wealthy civilizations to the north of Mexico. In 1536 Álvar Núñez Cabeza de Vaca and his three companions reached Mexico City as the only survivors of the Narváez expedition. Their account included references to possible cities in the north where great wealth might be found.

Inspired by these reports, Viceroy Antonio de Mendoza decided to send a small reconnaissance expedition northward in hopes of confirming the rumours. When the three surviving Spaniards from the Narváez expedition declined to lead the effort, Mendoza appointed Marcos de Niza as the leader and ordered Estevanico, the African slave who was the fourth companion of the survivors, to serve as a guide.

Marco had been recommended by his superior, Fray Antonio de Ciudad Rodrigo, who noted that he was a pious priest, familiar with "cosmography and navigation" and capable of leading a journey of discovery. In addition to Estevanico, a lay Franciscan friar, Onorato was assigned to the expedition, as well as a half-dozen Indians whom Marco had been teaching the rudiments of Spanish and Christianity. The Indians were natives of Sinaloa in northern Mexico and it was hoped they could serve as translators and guides.

The viceroy provided Marcos with written instructions, telling him to take careful note of everything he encounters, including Indian tribes, flora and fauna, fertility of the soil and the availability of water. In addition, Marcos was to inquire about the proximity of the ocean in the hope that a gulf or inlet might be found to provide access to the interior. Finally, the viceroy emphasized that Marcos "always try to travel as safely as possible" and "avoid giving [the natives] any cause to take action against your person".

The expedition left Mexico City in the autumn of 1538, accompanied by Francisco Vázquez de Coronado, the newly appointed governor of the frontier province Nueva Galicia at the northern edge of New Spain. By 15 December, they were in Compostela, the provincial capital of Nueva Galicia. Once there, Coronado recruited nearly 100 Indians from the region to join the Marcos expedition. They proceeded north along the coast until reaching Culiacan, the northernmost Spanish outpost. Marcos and his party left Culiacan on March 7, 1539, and began their exploration.

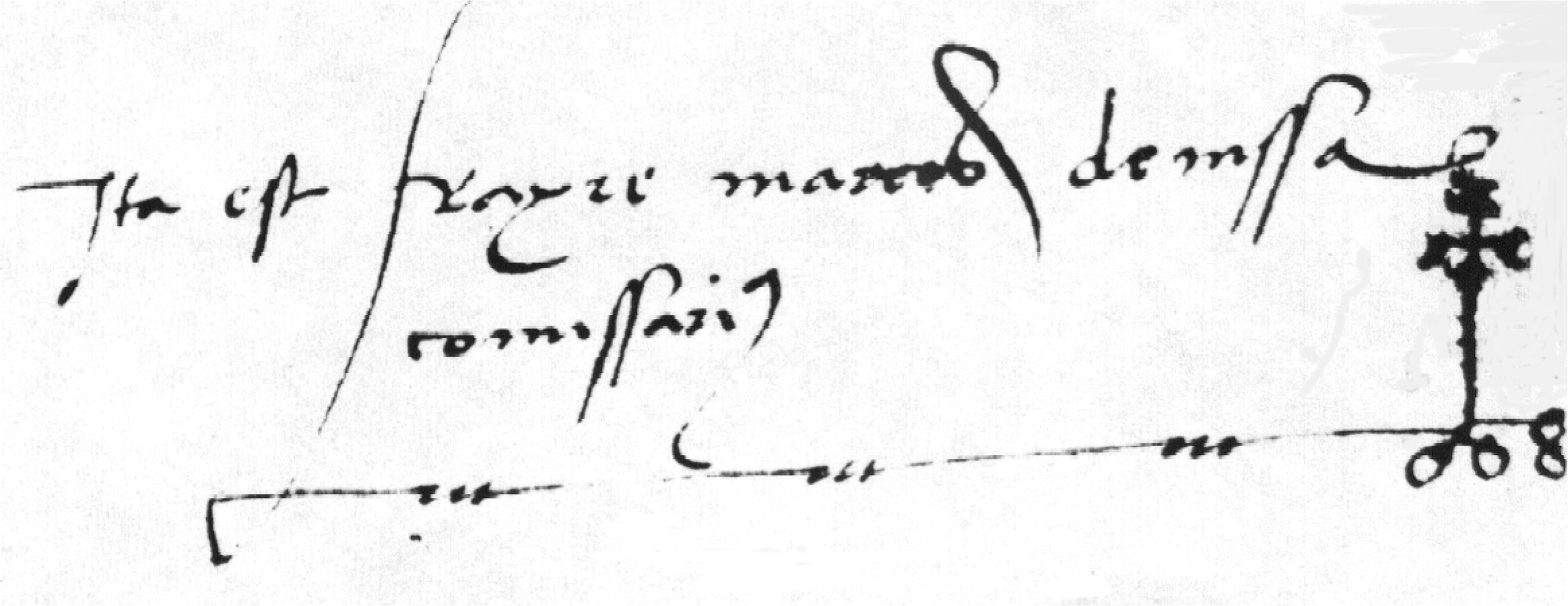
Signature of letters and reports

A week or so after the expedition began they encountered one of their first native villages, Petatlan, where Brother Onorato fell ill and was left behind to recover. As the two remaining explorers ventured inland, they came to a village called Vacapa where Marcos celebrated Easter mass. The natives received the priest warmly and referred to him as Satoya, or "man from heaven".

While in Vacapa, Marcos sent Estevanico and a group of Indians ahead to explore the country for fifty or sixty leagues to the north. Estevanico was instructed to communicate by sending back crosses, where the size of the cross indicated the importance of his discoveries. Four days later, a cross arrived that was as tall as a person. Estevanico had heard reports of seven large and wealthy cities in a land to the north called Cíbola. The messengers urged Marcos to come at once and meet with the scouting party.

Despite instructions from Marcos to wait for him, Estevanico and his party hurried forward, while Marcos travelled at a more leisurely pace, stopping often to rest, speak with the locals, and perform religious ceremonies. After several days, Marcos came upon a pueblo where the people dressed in cotton robes and wore turquoise jewellery. They claimed to know about Cibola, a wealthy land with buildings ten stories high. Marcos continued to follow Estevanico who occasionally sent back messengers bearing large crosses.

Along the way, Marcos attracted a group of native followers who accompanied him on the journey to Cibola. These companions reinforced the idea that a great city was ahead of them. Sometime in late May, Marcos encountered two men from Estevanico's party. Bloody from wounds and greatly agitated, they brought news that Estevanico and his men had been attacked by the inhabitants of Cibola and many were killed, including Estevanico.

The report caused a great upset among the Sonoran natives in the Marcos party. Many had kinsmen who were apparently killed along with Estevanico. When Marcos tried to calm them, they retorted "How can we be quiet...knowing that three hundred of our fathers, our sons, and our brothers...have been killed?" Some blamed Marcos for the deaths of their family members and threatened to kill him. In hopes of regaining their support, Marcos distributed all the gifts and trade goods he had been carrying and asked only that he be allowed to proceed to Cibola. A few of the Sonorans finally agreed to accompany him on a secret reconnaissance of the city.

Around 5 June 1539, Marcos came within sight of the city. Instead of risking his life and forfeiting the opportunity to report the information, Marcos decided not to go into Cibola but only observe it from a distance. Marcos described it as "very pretty" and "more extensive than Mexico [City]". The Indians who accompanied him assured Marcos that this was "the smallest of the seven cities". Then, following Mendoza's instructions, he raised a large pile of stones, placed a cross upon it and took possession of the discovered lands in the name of the Spanish Crown.

After staking claim to the country, Marcos made a hasty retreat. He found that the local Indians who were once friendly had turned hostile. He provides few details of his return trip except to say that he was "more full of fear than food". Marcos reached Mexico City in August 1539 and turned over a copy of his report to his Franciscan superiors on 26 August. On 2 September, Marcos personally delivered his report to Viceroy Mendoza.

== Coronado expedition ==
Marcos de Niza's expedition was viewed as a great success that seemed to confirm the extravagant rumours of a wealthy civilization beyond the northern frontier. In recognition of his accomplishments, Marcos was appointed provincial, or administrative head, of the Franciscan order in New Spain.

In October 1539, Viceroy Mendoza ordered Francisco Vázquez de Coronado to organize and lead an expedition to "reconnoitre and pacify lands and new provincias". A force of about 300 Spanish men-at-arms and 1500 native allies was gathered and set forth from Nueva Galicia in January 1540. Although he was now a high-ranking church official, Marcos served the expedition as a guide and led a small contingent of four Franciscans along with an entourage of assistants, servants, and slaves.

They ended up finding only a group of Zuni villages, not the Seven Cities of Cibola. At this time, Marcos de Niza was pronounced a liar and he was returned to Mexico City. Even though his report never mentioned gold, the Spanish and Coronado expected to find riches.

== Legacy and controversy ==
After being scapegoated, Marcos de Niza went back to Mexico City, where he held a very high position within the Franciscan leadership. He died in Mexico, City on 25 March 1558 due to persistent bad health.

Controversy still follows Marcos de Niza. Scholars and historians have continued to analyze Marcos's story of his journey to Cibola to figure out what actually happened, developing many different theories questioning whether or not Marcos actually made it to or saw the city of Cibola. Some theories state that Marcos simply would not have had enough time actually to reach Cibola. Another scholar came to the conclusion that he must have turned back way before he even came close to seeing the city based on the timeline and political complexities of exploration. Yet other researchers and scholars believe he did reach the long-lost city of Cibola.

=== Petroglyph ===
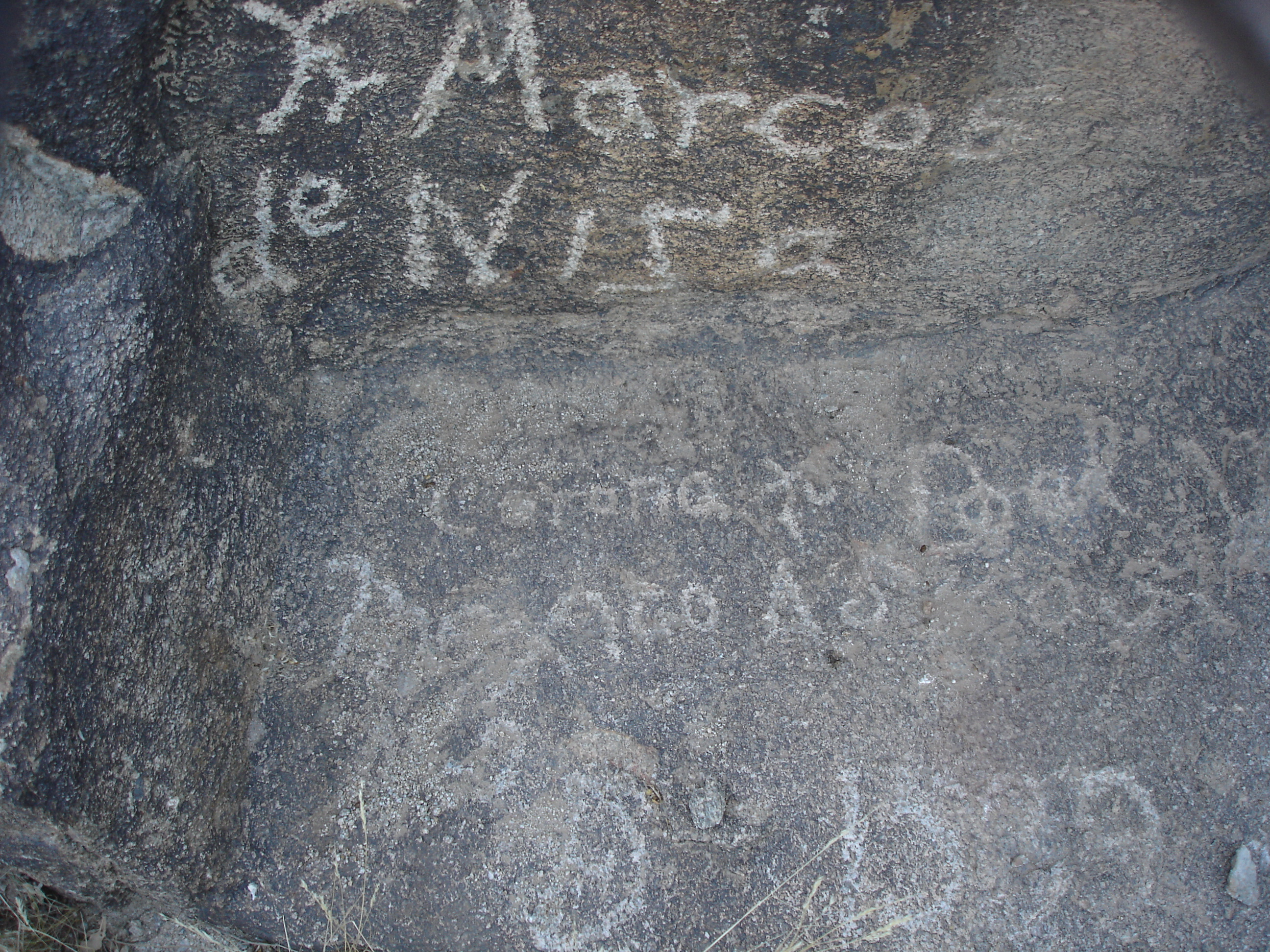
Forged inscription purported to have been left by Fray Marcos de Niza. Located in Pima Canyon near Phoenix, Arizona.

In the 1920s Matthew E. Bellew announced the discovery of a petroglyph on his land near Phoenix that appeared to have been left by Marcos de Niza. The inscription, written in Spanish, translates to “Fray Marcos de Niza crowned all of New Mexico at his expense in the year of 1539.” Most contemporary historians quickly called it a fraud, pointing out that the reference to "New Mexico" was an anachronism in 1539 and also noting that the expedition was not carried out "at his expense". One exception to the sceptics was historian and missionary Bonaventure Oblasser who cited the petroglyph to support his assertion that the expedition passed near Phoenix (most historians today believe that Marcos travelled through eastern Arizona along the San Pedro River).

In 2009 an opportunity arose to apply new analytic techniques to test the age of the inscription. These tests confirmed the original suspicions of fraud, dating the petroglyph to sometime between the 1850s and the 1920s.

== Bibliography ==
- Bandelier, Adolph Francis Alphonse (1981). Adolph F. Bandelier's The Discovery of New Mexico by the Franciscan Monk Friar Marcos de Niza in 1539. Madeleine Turrell Rodack (ed. & trans.). Tucson: University of Arizona Press. ISBN 0-8165-0717-1. OCLC 6864211.
- Dorn, Ronald I. (2012). "Assessing Early Spanish Explorer Routes Through Authentication of Rock Inscriptions" (PDF). Professional Geographer. 64 (3): 415–429. Bibcode:2012ProfG..64..415D. doi:10.1080/00330124.2011.603659. S2CID 131173178.
- Flint, Richard (2008). No Settlement, No Conquest: a History of the Coronado Entrada. Albuquerque: University of New Mexico Press. ISBN 978-0-8263-4362-8.
- Hallenbeck, Cleve (1987). The Journey of Fray Marcos de Niza (New ed.). Dallas, Tex.: Southern Methodist University Press. ISBN 0-87074-215-9.
- Hartmann, William K. (2001). "The Mysterious Journey of Friar Marcos de Niza". Coronado's Exploration into the American Southwest. Planetary Science Institute.
- Nallino, Michel; Hartmann, William K. (2003). "A Supposed Franciscan Exploration of Arizona in 1538: The Origins of a Myth". Kiva. 68 (4): 283–303. doi:10.1080/00231940.2003.11758479. ISSN 0023-1940. JSTOR 30246428. S2CID 130023803.
- Palumbo, Margherita (2007). "MARCO da Nizza". Dizionario Biografico degli Italiani (in Italian). Treccani.
- Rodriguez, Nadine Arroyo (21 February 2014). "Did You Know: Marcos De Niza Inscription At South Mountain Is Not Real". KJZZ, Fronteras Desk. Arizona.
- Undreiner, George J. (1947). "Fray Marcos de Niza and His Journey to Cibola*". The Americas. 3 (4): 415–486. doi:10.2307/978731. ISSN 0003-1615. JSTOR 978731. S2CID 143048453.
- Varnum, Robin (2014). Álvar Núñez Cabeza de Vaca : American Trailblazer. Norman. pp. 197–205. ISBN 978-0-8061-4497-9.
- Weber, David J. (1992). The Spanish Frontier in North America. New Haven: Yale University Press. ISBN 0-300-05198-0.
- Weber, David J. (1995). "Niza, Marcos de". Handbook of Texas Online.
- Maura, Juan Francisco. El gran burlador de América: Alvar Núñez Cabeza de Vaca. Colección Parnaseo-Lemir. Valencia: Universidad de Valencia, 2008.
- The Spanish Pioneers. Charles F. Lummis: The Spanish Pioneers

Catholic Church titles
Preceded by Antonio de Ciudad Rodrigo	Provincial of the province of the Holy Gospel	Succeeded by Francisco de Soto
