= Martín de Valencia =

Spanish Franciscan missionary

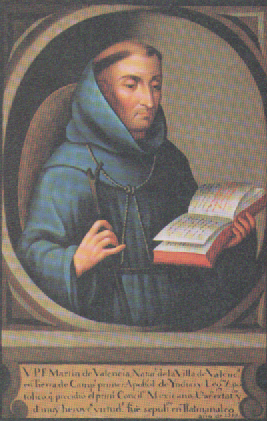
Portrait of Martín de Valencia

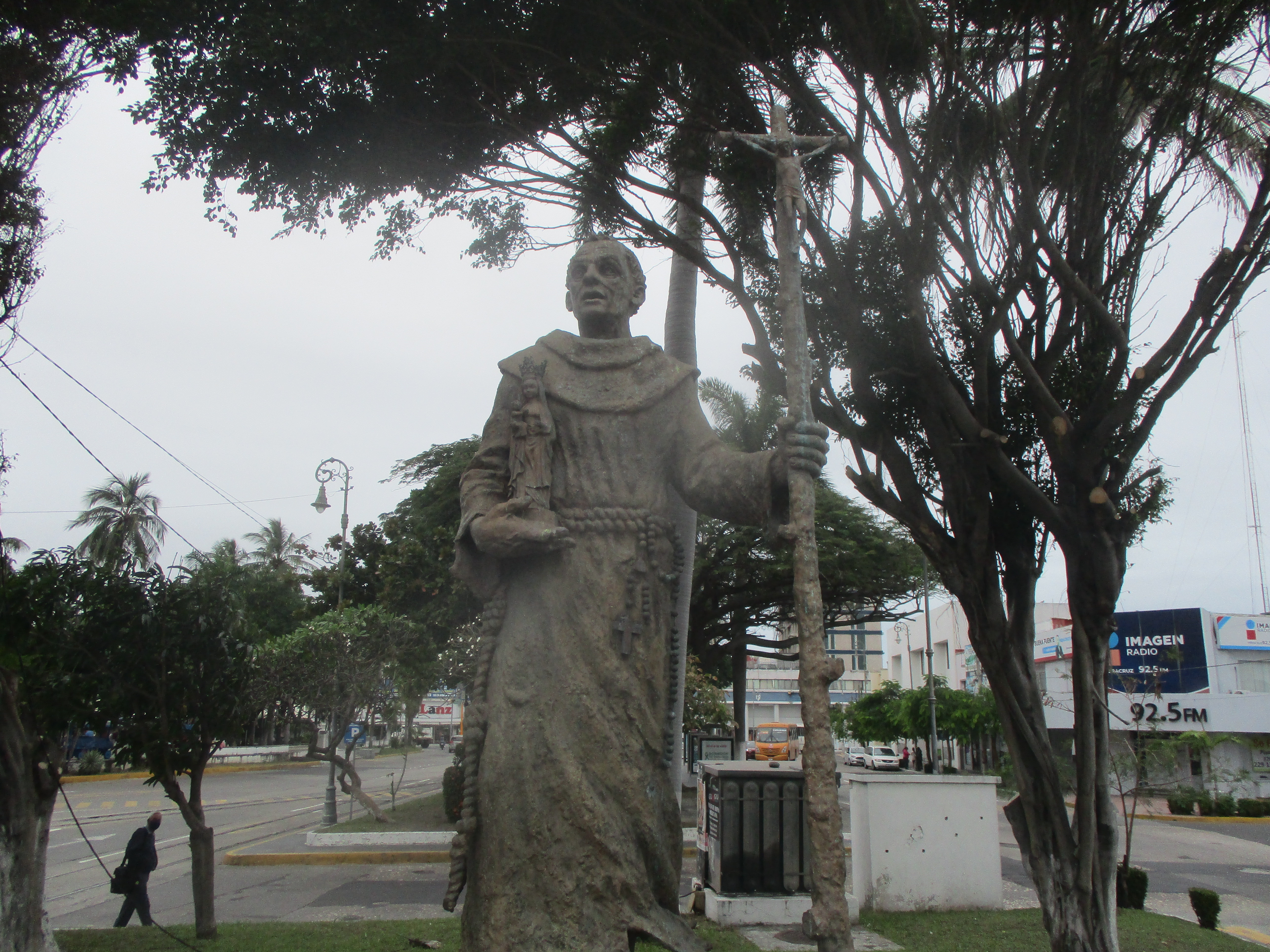
Monument in Veracruz

Martín de Valencia was born in Valencia de Don Juan, in the bishopric of Oviedo, Spain, ca. 1474. He died Tlalmanalco, Mexico, 21 March 1534. He was a Spanish Franciscan missionary, leader of the Twelve Apostles of Mexico, the first group of mendicants in New Spain.

== Life ==
He entered the Franciscan Order at Mayorga in the Province of Santiago. Fellow Franciscan Fray Toribio de Benavente Motolinia wrote an account of Fray Martin's life, following his death. After Fray Martin was ordained, he sent to the town of Valencia, from whence he took his name. He built the monastery of Santa Maria del Berrogal, and was the chief founder of the Custody of San Gabriel, for which he visited Rome.

In 1523, when he was 50, he was chosen to head a band of twelve Franciscans who were to work for the conversion of the Mexican natives, in what is sometimes called the "spiritual conquest." They reached their destination in May 1524, and were received by Hernán Cortés shortly after their arrival.

Fray Martín, as apostolic delegate, presided at the first ecclesiastical synod in the New World, 2 July 1524. At the same time he established the Custody of the Holy Gospel, of which he was elected the first custos. After an interval of three years he was re-elected in 1530. Many Franciscans learned indigenous languages in Mexico, preaching, teaching, and compiling dictionaries, books or sermons, and confessional manuals, in particular Nahuatl, but Fray Martin did not, although according to Motolinia, "he took great pleasure in hearing others preach."

He led a penitential life and was much praised by his fellow Franciscans.

After eight years in Mexico, in 1532, he sought to evangelize even farther afield in the Far East. According to Motolinia, Hernán Cortés promised Fray Martín ships to accomplish this. Fray Martín and eight Franciscans went to Tecoantepec, on the coast in the Zapotec region; however, the ships were not built and Fray Martín returned to central Mexico.

At the end of his life he lived in the Nahua town of Tlalmanalco. Nearby was the town of Amaquemecan (Amecameca), where he withdrew in a holy cave for prayer and meditation. His presence and impact in Amaquemecan was recorded by seventeenth-century Nahua historian and annalist, Chimalpahin, who wrote about the Franciscans in Amaquemecan and Fray Martín in particular. According to Chimalpahin, Fray Martín's residence brought prestige to Amaquemecan's ruler, Quetzalmaçatzin, who was baptized Don Tomás de San Martín Quetzalaçatzin Chichimeca teuchtli. However, the friar's presence also complicated the ruler's life, since Fray Martín pressured him to give up his multiple wives, a practice incompatible with Christianity.

When Fray Martín felt death was near, Don Tomás was worried that he not die in Amaquemecan. Fray Martín was returned to Tlalmanalco, where the ruler there was also concerned that the friar not die there, and attempted to send him by boat or canoe to Mexico City. He died on 21 March 1534, at the water's edge, and was initially buried there. His body was later moved to the Franciscan church of San Luis Obispo, built in 1532, in Tlalmanalco.

Fray Martin and his eleven fellow Franciscans, the Twelve Apostles of Mexico baptized large numbers of Indians.

== Sourced ==
- Harold, Epitome Annalium FF. Minorum (Rome, 1672);
- Gonzaga, De Origine Seraphicae Religionis, II (Rome, 1587);
- Fray Geronimo de Mendieta, Historia Eclesiastica Indiana (Mexico, 1870);
- Motolinia, Toribio de Benavente, Motolinia's History of the Indians of New Spain, translated by Elizabeth Andros Foster. Greenwood Press 1973;
- Ricard, Robert, The Spiritual Conquest of Mexico: An Essay on the Apostolate and the Evangelizing Methods of the Mendicant Orders in New Spain, 1523-1572, translated by Lesley Byrd Simpson. Berkeley: University of California Press 1966;
- Vetancurt, A. de Cronica de la Prov. del Santo Evangelo (Mexico, 1697);
- Vetancurt, A. de Menologio Franciscano (Mexico, 1697);
- Fray Juan de Torquemada, Monarquia Indiana, I (Madrid, 1723);
- Perusini, Cronologia Historico-Legalis, III (Rome, 1752).
