= Antonio de Ciudad Rodrigo =

Spanish friar

Fray Antonio de Ciudad Rodrigo (also Antonio Civitatencis) was a Franciscan friar. He was one of the first twelve to emigrate to New Spain in 1524, and the second provincial of the province of the Holy Gospel.

In 1527, Rodrigo brought Bernardino de Sahagún and a number of other young Franciscans to New Spain.

Catholic Church titles
Preceded by García de Cisneros	Provincial of the province of the Holy Gospel; 1537 ‐ 1540	Succeeded by Marcos de Niza
