= Capítulo Noble de Fernando VI =

Nobiliary corporation

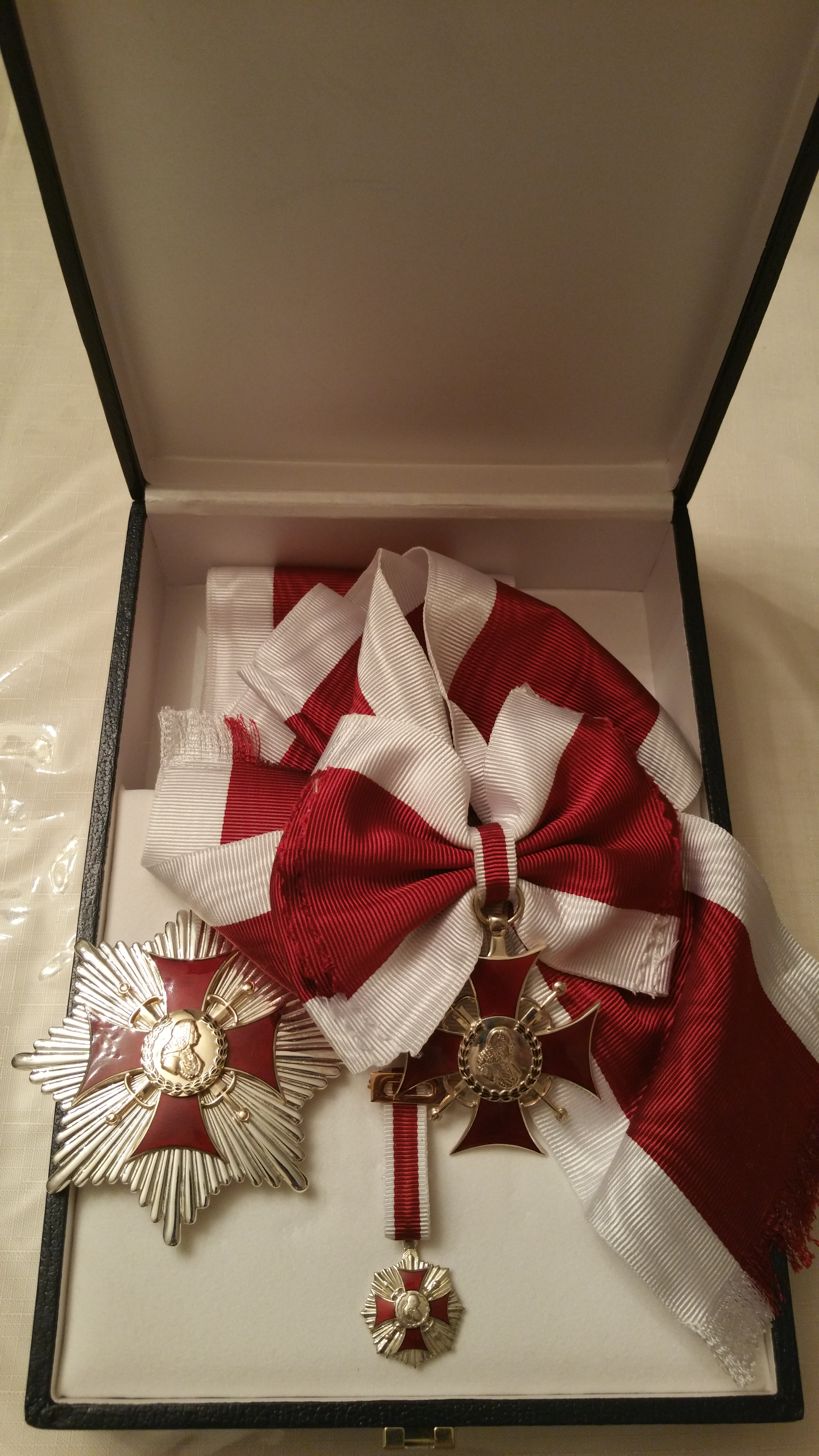
The decorations for a knight of the Capítulo Noble de Fernando VI

The Capítulo Noble de Fernando VI (English translation: Noble Chapter of Ferdinand VI) is a nobiliary corporation, with membership awarded to individuals on the basis of their status as nobility and their merit. The Capítulo Noble de Fernando VI is under the protection of Rafael Melgarejo de la Peña, the Duke of San Fernando de Quiroga. The Capítulo Noble de Fernando VI is dedicated to King Ferdinand VI of Spain and Queen Bárbara of Braganza.

== Notable knights and dames ==
- Duarte Pio, Duke of Braganza
- Prince Pedro Henrique of Orléans-Braganza
- Andrés Salvador of the House of Habsburg-Lorraine and Salm-Salm, Archduke of Austria, Prince of Tuscany and Royal Prince of Hungary
- Rafael Melgarejo de la Peña, Duke of San Fernando de Quiroga, Spain
- Víctor Manuel de Saboya
- Emanuele Filiberto of Savoy, Prince of Venice
- Moshin Ali Khan, Indian prince of Hyderabad
- David Bagration of Mukhrani
- Cardinal Antonio Cañizares Llovera
- Julián Barrio Barrio, archbishop of Santiago de Compostela
- Jorge Ortiga, archbishop of Hispânia
- Jules Mikhael Al-Jamil, archbishop of Tikrit
- Bruno Platter, Grand Master of the Teutonic Order, a Christian military order
- Manuel António Mendes dos Santos, bishop of São Tomé and Príncipe
- Prince Eudes, Duke of Angoulême
- Marie Liesse of the House of Rohan-Chabot, Duchess of Angoulême
- Luis Jaime of Carvajal and Salas, Duke of Aveyro
- Juan Manuel Mitjans y Domecq, Duke of Santoña
- Cristóbal Colón de Carvajal y Gorosábel, 18th Duke of Veragua
- Juan Pedro Soto y Martorell, Marquis of Lapilla
- Carlos Gereda y de Borbón
- José María Horrillo y López del Rey, Marquis of Vivanco
- Fernando Joaquín Molina y Alcalde, Count of Quinta Alegre
- Fernando María Musoles Martínez-Curt, Baron of Campo Olivar
- Lourenço Manoel de Vilhena, Duke of Terceira
- João Vicente of Saldanha Oliveira e Sousa, Marquis of Rio Maior
- Henry Kitchener, 3rd Earl Kitchener
- Simon Abney-Hastings, 15th Earl of Loudoun
- Vicenzo Mancella, Bishop of Cefalù
- Michele Pennisi, Archbishop of Monreale
- Raoni Santoro, Marquis of San Giorgio
