= Francisco de Soto =

Spanish composer and organist

Francisco de Soto (ca. 1500 – 1563) was a Spanish composer and organist. He worked in the Royal Court at Madrid. He was one of the Franciscan Twelve, a group of twelve Franciscan missionaries who arrived in the newly founded Viceroyalty of New Spain in May, 1524 for the purpose of the conversion of its indigenous population. He succeeded Fray Marcos de Niza, a Franciscan friar, as the Provincial of the province of the Holy Gospel, making de Soto the fourth provincial of the province of the Holy Gospel.

Catholic Church titles
Preceded by Fray Marcos de Niza	Provincial of the province of the Holy Gospel	Succeeded by N/A
