= Juan Juárez =

Spanish missionary and bishop

Juan Juárez OFM
- Born: Valencia, Spain
- Died: 1528
- Occupation: Friar
- Known for: One of the Twelve Apostles of Mexico; First bishop-elect in the territory of the United States

Juan Juárez (Note: Also spelled as Juan Xuarez.) (died 1528) was a Spanish Franciscan friar and one of the Twelve Apostles of Mexico. He has been named as the first bishop within what would become the United States. He was one of the first Spanish missionaries to set foot in Florida.

== Biography ==
Juárez was born in Valencia sometime at the end of the 15th century. He became a member of the Province of St. Gabriel of the Franciscans and traveled to New Spain in 1524. In 1526, he was appointed guardian of the convent of Huexotcingo. He returned to Spain the same year to acquire more missionaries. In 1527, he was appointed comisario over the friars who joined the mission.

Prior to leaving Spain, he was nominated as Bishop of Florida and Rio de las Palmas — which stretched from the Atlantic Ocean to the Pánuco River — by Charles V through royal patronage, which was confirmed by the Holy See. Juárez died in 1528, following a failed attempt of the colonization of Florida.

Whether or not he was bishop upon entering Florida has been questioned. Regarding Juárez's appointment as Bishop of Florida, John Gilmary Shea wrote:

In the Spanish portion we find the silly fable of Friar Juan Xuarez having been Bishop of Florida given as a fact, and the assertion made that he and his companions were the first missionaries to set foot on our territory. That Xuarez was a bishop is contradicted by every contemporaneous document, by the silence of all the Spanish writers, and by intrinsic facts.

Edwin Ryan said that Juárez's appointment as bishop was based upon a source that was published in 1723, which he considered to be unreliable. It is agreed upon by historians that he did not receive episcopal consecration. Juárez was, nonetheless, mentioned as a bishop-elect in several documents.

== Bibliography ==
- Clarke, Richard (1872). "Right Rev. Juan Juarez, O.S.F.". Lives of the Deceased Bishops of the Catholic Church in the United States. Vol. 1. P. O'Shea. pp. 21–31.
- Esperanza (July 1899). "Right Rev. Juan Xuarez, O. S. F.: FIRST BISHOP OF FLORIDA". The American Catholic Historical Researches. 16 (3): 142–144. JSTOR 44374096.
- Engelhardt, Zephyrin (January 1919). "Florida's First Bishop". The Catholic Historical Review. 4 (4): 479–485. JSTOR 25011600.
