= Twelve Apostles of Mexico =

16th century Franciscan missionaries

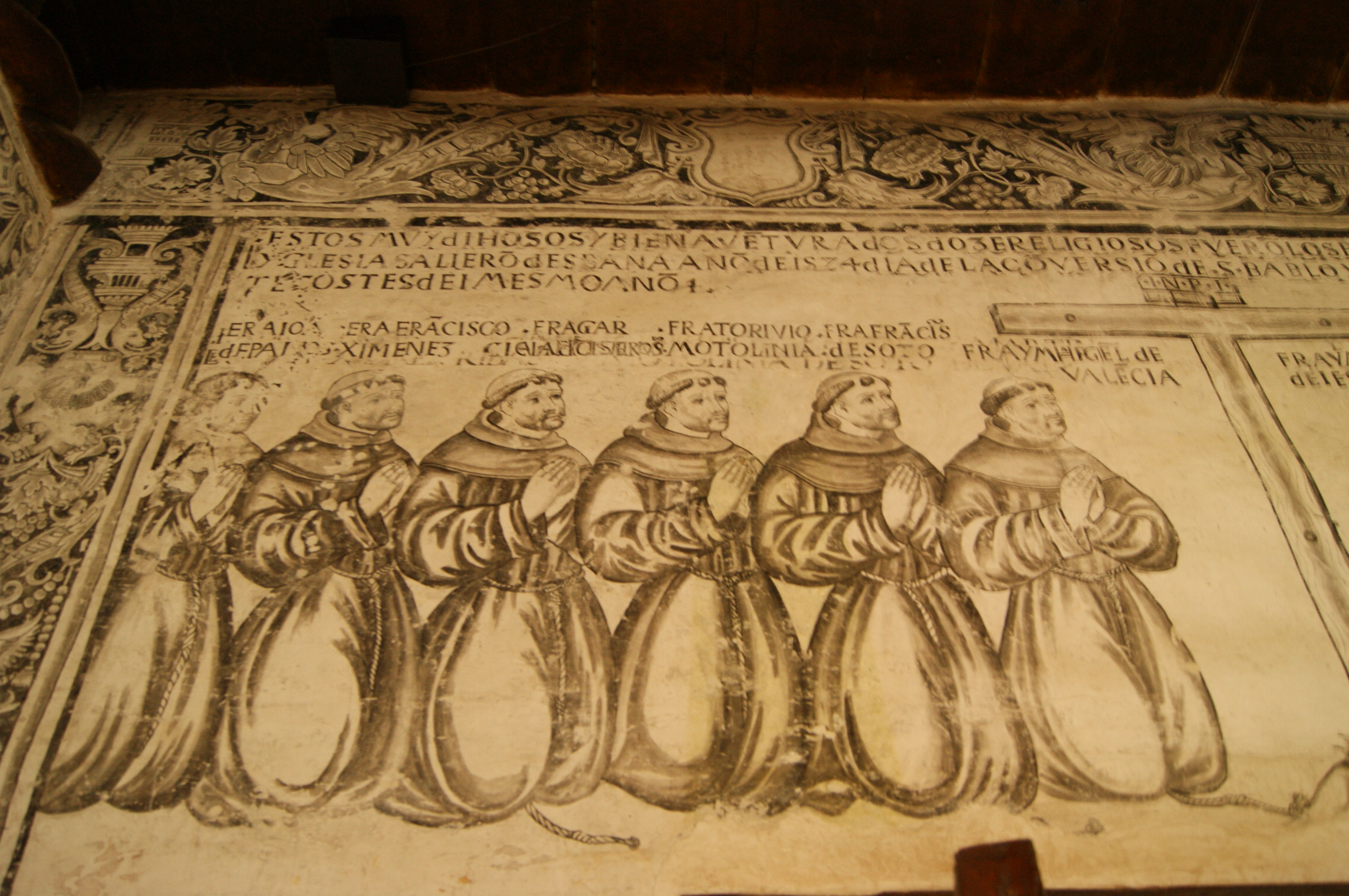
Six of the First Twelve, mural in the ex-convento of Huexotzinco. Motolinia is depicted fourth from the left

The Twelve Apostles of Mexico, the Franciscan Twelve, or the Twelve Apostles of New Spain, were a group of twelve Franciscan missionaries who arrived in the newly founded Viceroyalty of New Spain on May 13 or 14, 1524 and reached Mexico City on June 17 or 18, with the goal of converting its indigenous population to Christianity. Conqueror Hernán Cortés had requested friars of the Franciscan and Dominican Orders to evangelize the Indians. Despite the small number, it had religious significance and marked the beginning of the systematic evangelization of the Indians in New Spain.

Franciscan Fray Pedro de Gante had already begun the evangelization and instruction of natives in New Spain since 1523. Fray Juan Galpión had offered himself as a missionary but could not go himself. He organized the Twelve Franciscans with Fray Martín de Valencia as its head. The group consisted of:

- Fray Martín de Valencia, their leader
- Fray Francisco de Soto
- Fray Martín de Coruña, also known as Fray Martín de Jesǘs
- Fray Juan Juárez
- Fray Antonio de Ciudad Rodrigo
- Fray Toribio de Benavente Motolinia
- García de Cisneros
- Fray Luis de Fuensalida
- Juan de Ribas
- Fray Francisco Jiménez
- Fray Andrés de Córdoba,
- Fray Juan de Palos.

Juan de Palos, a lay Franciscan, took the place of Fray Bernardino de la Torre, who did not sail with the group. Fray Andrés de Córdoba was also a lay brother.

The most famous of the Twelve was Toribio de Benavente Motolinia, whose extensive writings on the customs of the Nahuas and the challenges of Christian evangelization make his works essential for the history of this key period in Mexican history.

== Missionary orders ==
The Franciscan Twelve received holy orders ("obediencia") from the minister general of the Order of Friars Minor, Francisco De los Angeles, prior to their departure for Mexico. A copy of this obediencia was brought to New Spain when they arrived in 1524.

These orders were interspersed with the expectations of conduct of the Franciscan Twelve, including expectations of the hardships and possible death in serving in such a role. The Franciscan Twelve are described as being similar to the first apostles in their missionary deeds and aspirations. Conceptualizations of the divine duty of Christian conversion, the palpability of the Devil's force on Earth, and New Spain acting as a battleground between God and the Devil make an appearance in these orders. Natives are depicted as entirely ignorant to this war for their souls, and thus, De los Angeles stresses the natives' need for the conversion the Franciscan Twelve offer.

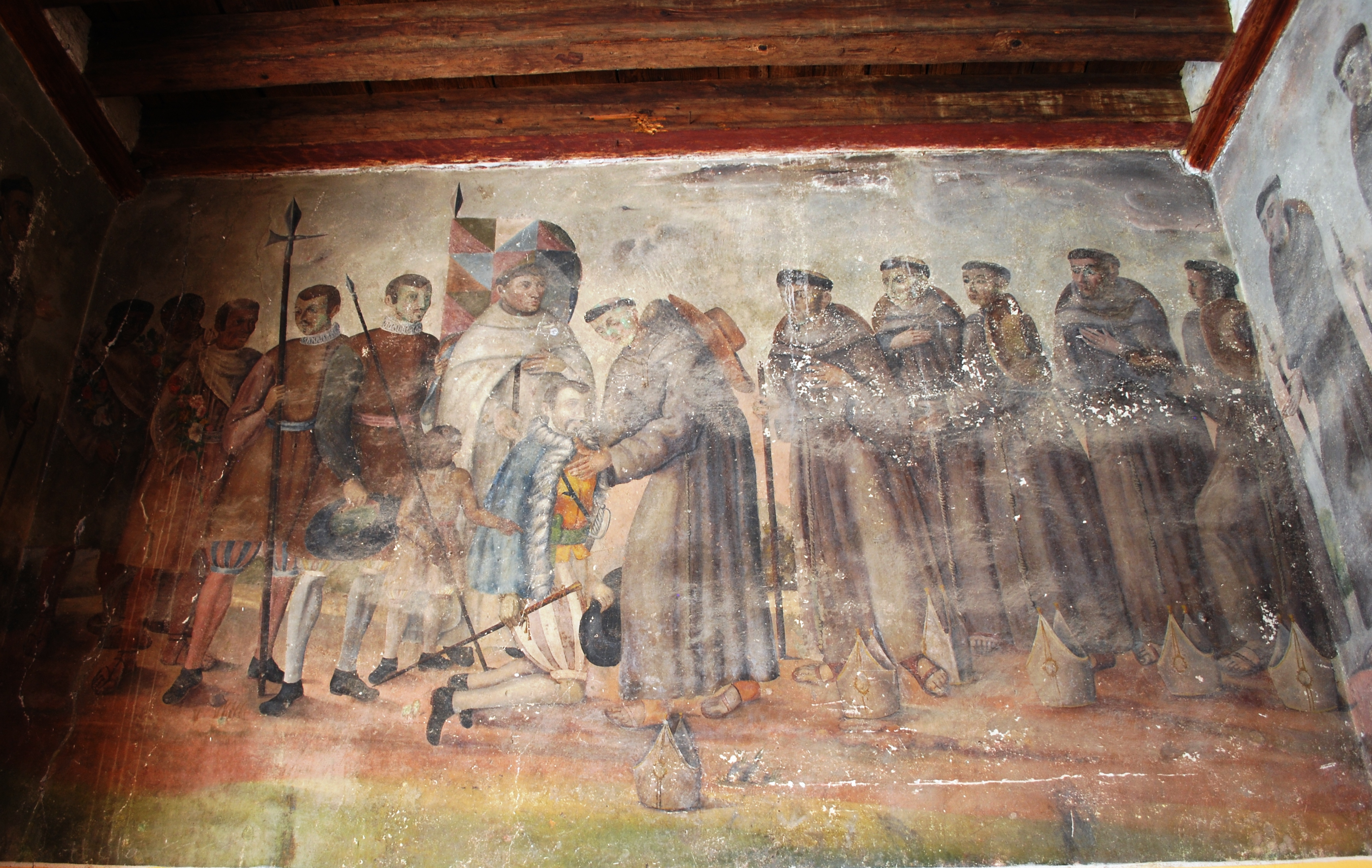
Cortés and the Arrival of the Franciscans – Ozumba

== Areas of evangelization ==
The first evangelization began in 1500 on Santo Domingo, where the Franciscan mission was officially established.

The Twelve Apostles of New Spain arrived at Mexico in 1524, greeted by the Aztec conquerors' Hernán Cortés. Evangelization began in the Valley of Mexico and the Valley of Puebla. They chose these areas as their first foundations due to them being important indigenous settlements.

In the Valley of Puebla, Tlaxcala and Huejotzinco, both allies of the Spaniards in the conquest of the Mexica, were chosen. In the Valley of Mexico, Texcoco, another ally of the Spaniards and formerly a member of the Aztec Triple Alliance was an initial site, as well as Churubusco.

== Initial reception of the Twelve ==
The Twelve were originally received in the Aztec capital of Tenochtitlan in 1524. The lords and holy men of the Aztec empire accepted the Spaniards' arrival, and even accepted the Spaniards and their king as rulers. However, the Aztec leaders took issue with the Spaniards' religious doctrines that were being pressed upon them. They accepted many of the ideas the Spaniards believed in, except the statement the Franciscan friars made that the Aztecs worshipped false gods.

The Aztec leaders expressed that their tradition of ancestral worship and supplication to their gods would not be easily abandoned. In a subtle political maneuver, the Aztecs leaders asserted that while they would never incite a rebellion or foster unrest, the same could not be said about the rest of the population.

=== Additional barriers to conversion ===
The Franciscan Twelve faced a considerable hurdle to their evangelization efforts: the numerous native languages. In addition, the fact that natives lived quite dispersed outside of urban centers posed a difficulty. Such barriers were later addressed through the creation of "pueblos de indios", also known as "reducciones indígenas": the conglomeration of natives into towns to ease evangelization.

== Institutions of evangelization ==
=== Schools ===
The education of natives – especially their children – was a crucial practice in relation to their evangelization. Thus, schools became institutions of power and control. Following Cortés and his successful military conquests in the Valley of Mexico, Texcoco was the location of school established by three Franciscans, one of which was Pedro de Gante. In 1524, the Franciscan Twelve followed de Gante's example, establishing schools in Tlatelolco-Mexico City, Tlaxcala, and Huejotzingo, to name a few.

=== Pueblos de Indios ===
The aforementioned pueblos de indios, also known as "reducciones indígenas", were methods used to centralize native living structures. Pueblos were promoted by the Spanish authorities in the second half of the 16th century, starting with a royal decree in 1548. They were devised to more easily instruct the population in Christianity and evangelize, and carry out a more efficient collection of taxes.

=== Mission churches (Conventos) ===
The Franciscan Twelve initiated the sociopolitical tool of the "Mission church", which benefitted both the Roman Catholic Church and Spanish Crown, often inextricably linked in early Spanish-American relations. This began after Pope Paul III's Sublimis Deus decree in 1537, that native persons were not "savages" and instead human beings with souls and possessing the intellectual capability of understanding – and thus adopting the beliefs of – Christianity. This ended the mass subjection of native populations to enslavement, though not eliminating this practice in entirety.

Thus, religious orders sent their piety to New Spain in droves particularly between 1523 and 1580. Among these religious orders were the Dominicans, the Franciscans, Augustinians, and the Jesuits. These orders were employed to convert the native inhabitants and expand the hold of Christianity. To do so, friars built mission churches (conventos in Spanish) in indigenous communities. These churches acted as the home base of the religious militia consisting of these orders' friars, and served to empower the Church through acting as bases of conversion, and facilitated the colonization of New Spain without the use of a standing army.

== Transformative impact and precedent ==
The Franciscan Twelve arriving in New Spain was the beginning of a sweeping wave of evangelization that would come to encompass a large swath of indigenous city-states. The Franciscan Twelve galvanized a new era of missionary work. From 1524 to 1534, Dominicans and Augustinians joined the "spiritual conquest".

Gonzalo Fernandez de Oviedo, a 16th-century historian, remarked of this phenomenon that "...these lands are flooded with friars; but none are greying, all being less than thirty years old. I pray to God that they are capable of serving Him." Despite other religious orders being present and emphasizing conversion, the Franciscans were unique in that they believed their evangelization efforts, in addition to the creation of a "primitive apostolic church" in New Spain, would result in the second coming of Christ.

This new wave of missionaries further established the Roman Catholic Church as a figurehead within New Spain and indigenous livelihood. The system of patronato real (royal patronage) allowed for the unprecedented privilege of the Spanish Crown in Church affairs, in exchange for Spain's funding of missionary ventures abroad. Through this system, the Spanish Crown and Roman Catholic Church grew in tandem economically, geographically, and politically, and created a strong foundation for the future of Spanish colonization, conversion, and capitalization.

== Sources ==
- Matthew Bunson The Catholic Almanac's Guide to the Church, Our Sunday Visitor Inc., U.S. (2001), p. 56
- Toribio de Benavente Motolinia, Motolinia's History of the Indians of New Spain. Translated by Elizabeth Andros Foster. Greenwood Press 1973
- Robert Ricard. The Spiritual Conquest of Mexico: An Essay on the Apostolate and the Evangelizing Methods of the Mendicant Orders in New Spain, 1523–1572. Originally published in French 1933. Translated by Lesley Byrd Simpson. Berkeley: University of California Press 1966.
