= Juan de Gaona =

Fray Juan de Gaona (1507–1560) was a Franciscan friar. Born in 1507 in Burgos Spain, he studied at the University of Paris before journeying to New Spain in 1538.

Gaona died on 27 September 1560. Around 1542 he composed a Nahuatl-language text, Colloquies de la Paz, y tranquilidad Christiana ("Dialogues of peace and Christian tranquillity"), which was published after his death in 1582.

== Notes ==
Catholic Church titles
Preceded by Toribio Motolinia	Provincial of the province of the Holy Gospel	Succeeded by Juan de San Francisco
