= Toribio de Benavente =

Spanish Franciscan missionary in colonial Mexico (1482–1565)

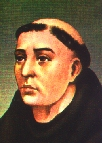

Toribio of Benavente (1482, Benavente – 1565, Mexico City, New Spain), also known as Motolinía, was a Franciscan missionary and one of the famous Twelve Apostles of Mexico who arrived in New Spain in May 1524. (Note: See Thomas, Prologue, chapter 4 where he names (i) the clerics (including a Franciscan friar) who were present with Hernán Cortés in 1522; (ii) the three Flemish Franciscan lay brothers who came out in 1523 (two of whom died prematurely); and (iii) the "Twelve" (10 Franciscan priests and two Franciscan lay brothers) who came out to New Spain in 1524) His published writings are a key source for the history and ethnography of the Nahuas of central Mexico in the immediate post-conquest period as well as for the challenges of Christian evangelization.

He is probably best known for his attacks on the Dominican defender of the rights of the indigenous peoples, Bartolomé de las Casas, who criticized the Conquest. Though agreeing with Las Casas's criticism of the abuses of the conquistadors, he did not agree with the wholesale condemnation of the Spanish Conquest, as well as criticisms of the Franciscan practice of baptism en masse of the indigenous people of the new world. Due to these differences he went on to vilify Las Casas.

== Early life ==
Toribio entered the Franciscan Order at the age of seventeen, dropping his family name of Paredes in favor of his city of birth, as was the custom among the Franciscans. In 1523, he was chosen to be among the Twelve Apostles of Mexico, to be sent to the New World.

== Evangelist New Spain ==
After a strenuous journey he arrived in Mexico, where he was greeted with great respect by Hernán Cortés. Upon walking through Tlaxcala the Indians said of his ragged Franciscan robes "Motolinia", Nahuatl for "one who is poor or afflicted." That was the first word he learned in the language, and he took it as his name.

For the Franciscan Order, poverty was an important and defining virtue. He was named Guardian of the Convent of San Francisco in Mexico City, where he resided from 1524 to 1527. He also chose Catalina de Bustamante to teach in the first school for indigenous girls in the New World and was aligned with the educational aspect of Franciscan missionary efforts.

From 1527 to 1529, he worked in Guatemala and perhaps Nicaragua, studying the new missions in that area. Back in Mexico, he stayed at the convent of Huejotzinco, near Tlaxcala, where he had to help the natives against the abuse and atrocities committed by Nuño de Guzmán. He suggested for the native leaders to complain to Bishop Juan de Zumárraga about Guzmán, but the latter accused him of trying to instigate a revolt among the Indians against the Spanish.

In 1530, he went to the Convent of Tlaxcala and contributed in the foundation of the City of Puebla de los Ángeles, which was chosen for its agricultural and other economic potential; it was to be a settlement of Spaniards who pursued agriculture themselves without the aid of indigenous labor of the encomienda. With Franciscan colleagues, he traveled to Tehuantepec, Guatemala, and to the Yucatán to undertake further missionary work.

Even though Motolinía protected Indians against the abuse of Guzmán, he did not share the opinions of the Dominican bishop, Bartolomé de las Casas, who saw the conquest and subjugation of the Indians as a crime against all Christian morality. Motolinía believed that God would protect the Indians once converted and that the missionary work thus was more important than fighting the encomienda system, and defended it along with evangelization. In a famous letter to King Charles V of Spain, he undertook a virulent attack on Las Casas, intending to discredit him completely. He called him "a grievous man, restless, importunate, turbulent, injurious, and prejudicial", and even an apostate, in that he had renounced the Bishopric of Chiapas. He advised the king to have Las Casas shut up for safe keeping in a monastery.

In 1541, Benavente was the first to propose to turn New Spain into an independent kingdom ruled by a Spanish prince, which would allow for an easier rule compared to depending from the remote Spain.

In 1545, the encomenderos of Chiapas asked for him to come there to defend them against Las Casas but he declined, in the same way he declined a position as bishop offered to him by the king. The letter to the king is an important document, clarifying the Franciscan position of baptizing as many Indians as possible if they presented themselves for it. In the time of the conquest Mexico's devastating plagues had reduced the indigenous population considerably and the Franciscans feared for the souls of Indians who died without baptism.

They took the position that they should baptize to ensure salvation, but also continue pastoral care so that Indians would grow more knowledgeable about their new Christian faith. The Dominican Order was famous for its adherence to firm doctrinal positions, which meant that they refused baptism to Indians in Mexico if they were deemed to lack knowledge in the tenets of Christianity.

In his letter to the king, Motolinia recounts an incident of Las Casas's refusal to baptize an Indian in Tlaxcala.;

I said to Las Casas: "How is this, father, all this zeal and love that you say you have for the Indians is exhausted in loading them down and going around writing about Spaniards, and vexing the Indians, since your grace loads down more Indians than thirty (Franciscan) friars? And since you won't baptize or instruct an Indian, it would be well if you would pay those that you so load down and tire out."

From 1548 to 1551 he was provincial of the Province of Santo Evangelio. An early chapter of Motolinia's history recounts what he considered the ten plagues afflicting New Spain, bringing the Biblical metaphor of the Ten Plagues into the unfolding events in early Mexico. He considered smallpox the first plague; the second, the number of those who died in the conquest; the third, famine following the fall of Tenochtitlan; the fourth, native and black labor bosses and tribute collectors; the fifth, the Indians' tax and tribute obligations; the sixth, Indians forced to labor in Spanish gold mines; the seventh, the building of Mexico City; the eighth, enslavement of Indians to work in the mines; the ninth, the labor in mines far from Indians' homes; and the tenth plague, the factionalism of Spaniards, particularly when Cortés left central Mexico for conquests in Honduras.

With the exception of smallpox and factionalism among Spaniards, Motolinia considered Spaniards' deliberate oppression and exploitation of the Indians the worst afflictions. By 1555, Motolinia expressed hope to King Charles V that both secular and religious power in the Americas would be consolidated under the Spanish Crown as a theocracy, following the book of the Apocalypse.

== Death ==
Having founded many cloisters and convents in Mexico and baptized an estimated 400,000-plus Indians, he retired to the friary of San Francisco in Mexico City, where he died in 1568. He is remembered in Mexico as one of the most important evangelists.

== Ethnographies ==
Motolinia is well known for his two histories of the Aztec and for recording incidents in the evangelization of the Indians. Motolinia recounted the martyrdom of three converted boys from Tlaxcala (Cristóbal, Antonio, and Juan), who were killed by adults who resisted conversion. In Motolinia's account, the deaths of Juan and Antonio were premeditated:

[S]ome lords and important men had... arranged to kill these children [Juan and Antonio] because they were breaking their idols and depriving them of their gods.... Antonio came out at once, and when he saw the cruelty with which these brutes were treating his servant (Juan), instead of fleeing he said to them with great spirit: "Why are you killing my companion; for it is not his fault but mine? I am the one who is taking away your idols, because I know that they are devils and not gods. If you consider them gods, take them and leave that boy alone, for he has done you no harm." Saying this he threw on the ground some idols which he was carrying in his skirt. By the time he finished speaking these words, the Indias had killed the child Juan, and then they fell upon the other, Antonio, so that they also killed him.

The children had been put in the care of lords of Tlaxcala by the leader of the Twelve Apostles of Mexico, Martín de Valencia, who Motolinia thought would be especially saddened by the murders. Antonio was not just a child convert but would have become heir to a principal lord of Tlaxcala. To the Franciscans, the martyrdom of the Tlaxcalan boys showed the bravery and the zeal of new converts to the faith and the excellence of the Franciscans' strategy of converting children for the long-term growth of Christianity.

Unlike the writings of fellow Franciscan Bernardino de Sahagún, particularly the Florentine Codex, Motolinia's writings are unsystematic in their organization, as he acknowledged. However, as one of the earliest friars evangelizing in the densest area of Nahua populations, what he wrote is extremely important as a record of indigenous life and first encounters with the Spaniards.

An English translation of significant portions of Motolinia's works was done by Elizabeth Andros Foster in 1950 for the Cortés Society and reissued in 1973 by Greenwood Press. Her introduction to the translation has a careful discussion of Motolinia's life and works.

- Historia de los Indios de la Nueva España, which was not published until 1858, edited by Joaquín García Icazbalceta.
- Memoriales, first published in 1903.
- Motolinia's History of the Indians of New Spain translated and edited by Elizabeth Andros Foster. Greenwood Press 1973.

== Sources ==
- Arjona, Doris K. (1952). "'The Twelve' Meet a Language Requirement". Hispania. 35 (3): 259–266. doi:10.2307/335749. JSTOR 335749.
- Canedo, Lino G. (1973). "Toribio Motolinia and His Historical Writings". The Americas. 29 (3): 277–307. doi:10.2307/980054. JSTOR 980054. S2CID 147249930.
- Habig, Marion A. (1945). "The Franciscan Provinces of Spanish North America (Concluded)". The Americas. 1 (3): 330–344. doi:10.2307/978158. JSTOR 978158.
- Righetti-Templer, Stephanie (2019). Der spanische Franciscanismo in der Neuen Welt. Eine Untersuchung zum Transfer der franziskanischen Theologie im 16. Jahrhundert nach Lateinamerika anhand der Werke von Fray Toribio de Benavente Motolinía [Spanish Franciscanismo in the New World. An Study of the Transfer of Franciscan Theology to Latin America in the 16th Century on the Basis of the Works of Fray Toribio de Benavente Motolinía]. Münster: Lit, ISBN 978-3-643-14408-9.
- Thomas, Hugh (2011). The Golden Age: The Spanish Empire of Charles V. London: Penguin Books.

Catholic Church titles
| Preceded by Alonso Rancrel | Provincial of the Province of Santo Evangelio | Succeeded by Juan de Gaona |
