= Agustín Esteve =

Spanish painter

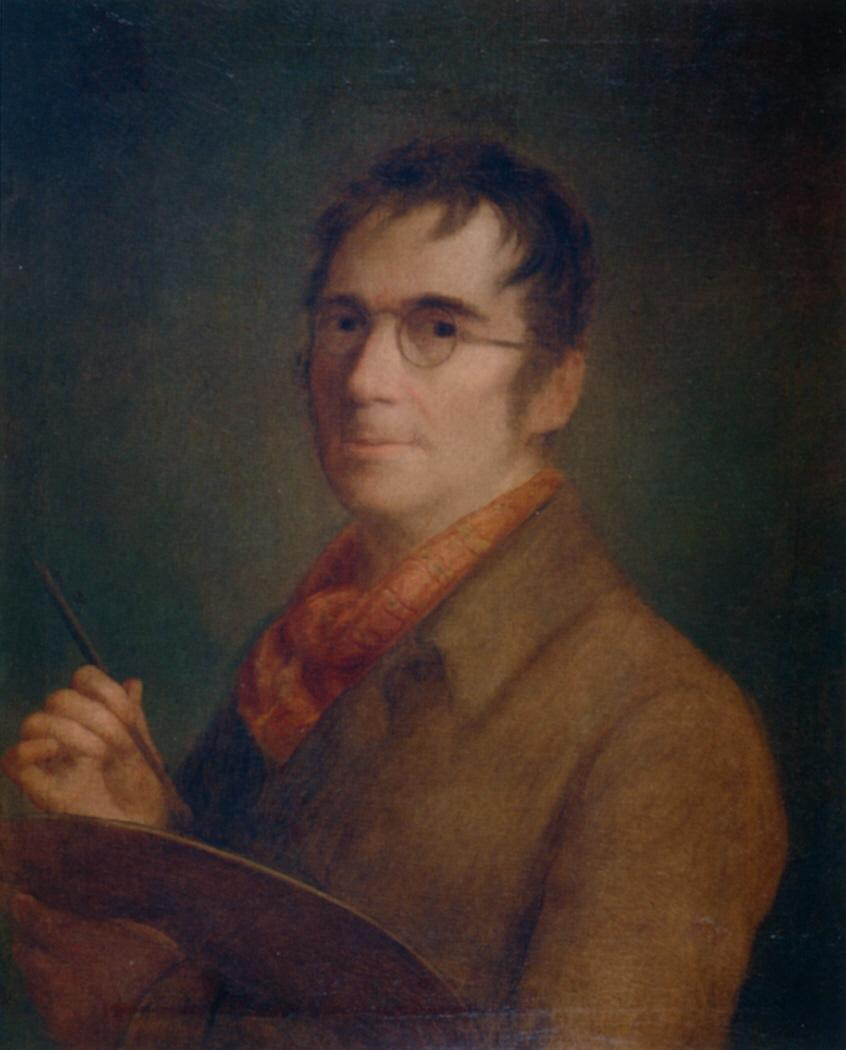
Generally believed to be his self-portrait (c.1815)

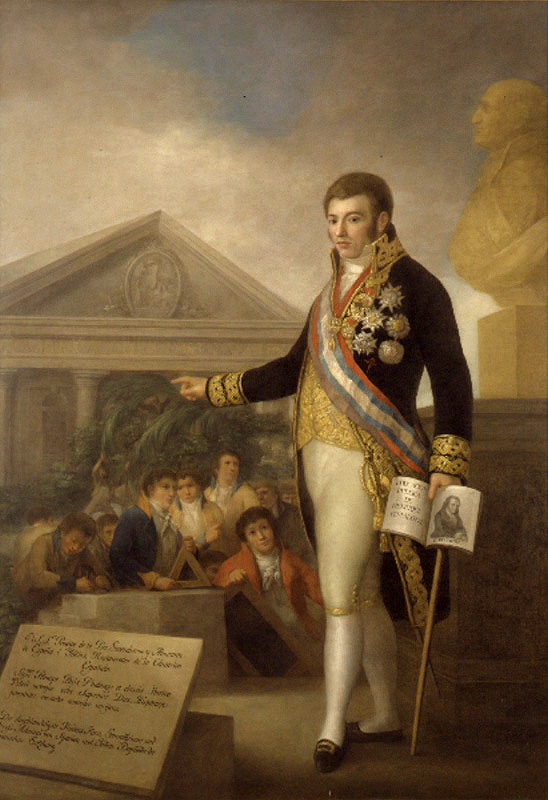
Portrait of Manuel Godoy founding the Instituto Pestalozziano (1805)

Agustín Esteve y Marqués (May 12, 1753 – 1830) was a Spanish painter, mainly active in the Royal household in Madrid.

== Biography ==
Agustín Esteve was a portraitist to the Spanish Crown, who was influenced by Francisco Goya, including numerous copies of portraits by the great master. Among his masterworks is the portrait of the Countess of San Andrés de Parma. Condesa de Lerena, Mª Josefa Piscatori Díaz de Lavandero (ca.1800).

Esteve was born in Valencia, in the province of the same name, on the 12 May 1753, possibly the son of a Valencian sculptor also named Agustín Esteve. He grew up in Valencia and studied at the Academia de Bellas Artes de San Carlos in that city. In 1772 he won a first prize in the third class in the Painting department for a drawing at Madrid's Real Academia de Bellas Artes de San Fernando. In 1778, Esteve failed to win the first prize at the Academia de San Fernando for painting.

Like Goya, Esteve became established when the neoclassicism of Anton Raphael Mengs was still dominant in Madrid. However, in the late 18th century, Esteve came under Goya's influence, as well.

On June 14, 1800, the King named Esteve Painter to the Court. He was paid a salary of 6,000 reals compared to the 15,000 that most other painters received, or the 65,000 of Francisco Goya.
