= Francisco de Saavedra =

Spanish Army officer and politician (1746–1819)

The Most Excellent Francisco de Saavedra
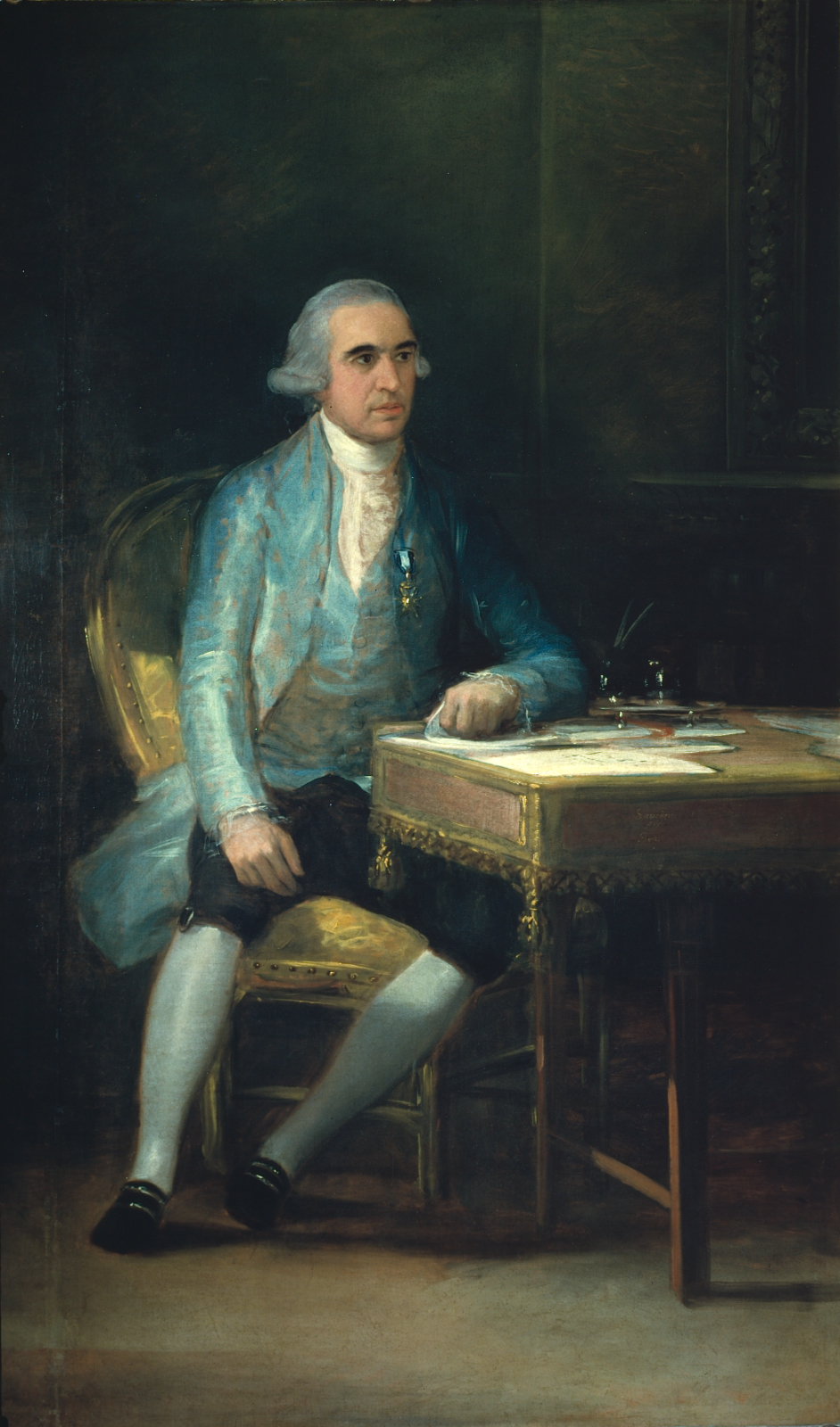
- Portrait by Francisco Goya, 1798

Prime Minister of Spain
- In office 30 March 1798 – 21 February 1799
- Monarch: Charles IV
- Preceded by: Manuel de Godoy
- Succeeded by: Mariano Luis de Urquijo

Personal details
- Born: Francisco Saavedra de Sangronis; 4 October 1746 Seville, Spain
- Died: 25 November 1819 (aged 73) Seville, Spain

Military service
- Allegiance: Spain
- Branch/service: Spanish Army
- Years of service: 1768–1819
- Rank: General
- Unit: Infantry Regiment "Inmemorial del Rey" No. 1

General Francisco Saavedra de Sangronis (4 October 1746 – 25 November 1819) was a Spanish Army officer and politician who served as the prime minister of Spain from 1798 to 1799.

== Early career ==
Francisco Saavedra was born in Seville, Spain on 4 October 1746, and trained as a doctor. He served alongside Bernardo de Gálvez in Spain's military campaign at Algiers in the 1770s, and through him changed career to work in Spain's Ministry of the Indies, principally as a financial planner. In 1780, he was sent to try to sort out the Spanish administration at Havana in Cuba, with the additional task of working alongside Gálvez once more, to retake Florida from British control. When the ship taking him to the Caribbean was captured by the British, Saavedra passed himself off as a merchant, and was allowed free movement within Jamaica (the British being unaware that just two years earlier he had been involved in planning for a future Spanish invasion of the colony). He took the opportunity to find out all he could about Jamaica's ports, defences etc. He recorded in his diary in 1780:

What is not being thought about at present, what ought to occupy the whole attention of politics, is the great upheaval that in time the North American revolution is going to produce in the human race.

== Saavedra and Yorktown ==
In January 1781, he was released by the British, and travelled to Havana. After making initial recommendations for administrative changes, over the next few months he helped to organise, and actually took part in Gálvez' successful siege of Pensacola, the key British base in Florida. On his return he found that his recommendations had been accepted by the Spanish government, and key officials had been replaced. In July, at the request of the Minister (José de Gálvez, Bernardo's uncle), Saavedra, who spoke and wrote French fluently, met in the French colony of St. Domingue with Admiral de Grasse to discuss the best ways of using the large French fleet he had brought across the Atlantic, and they agreed a plan for the following year, known as the Grasse-Saavedra Convention. The first priority was to aid the French and American forces in the United States, preferably by attacking the British army in Virginia under Lord Cornwallis. The next priority was to regain control of Caribbean islands captured by the British. The final goal of the plan was the capture of Jamaica, by far the richest British colony in the West Indies.

To finance phase 1, Saavedra obtained 100,000 pesos from the Spanish treasury in neighboring Santo Domingo. The Spanish had planned to finance the French and North Americans with pesos shipped through Veracruz from the mines in Mexico. The ships had not arrived, and then, finding that most of the Government money from Havana had been sent on to Spain, he appealed to Cuban citizens, who raised a further 500,000 pesos in a matter of hours.

On August 17, the frigate Aigrette departed Cuba with the funds and rendezvoused with the remaining French fleet the following day, setting course for Chesapeake Bay. On August 30, they arrived off the Virginia coast, and by September 5, Robert Morris finally obtained 26,600 pesos from the French army’s treasurer to compensate the Continental Army soldiers. Eyewitness reports state this was the only payment the troops received throughout the war. Just over a month later, these American forces, alongside their French allies, achieved the critical triumph at Yorktown.

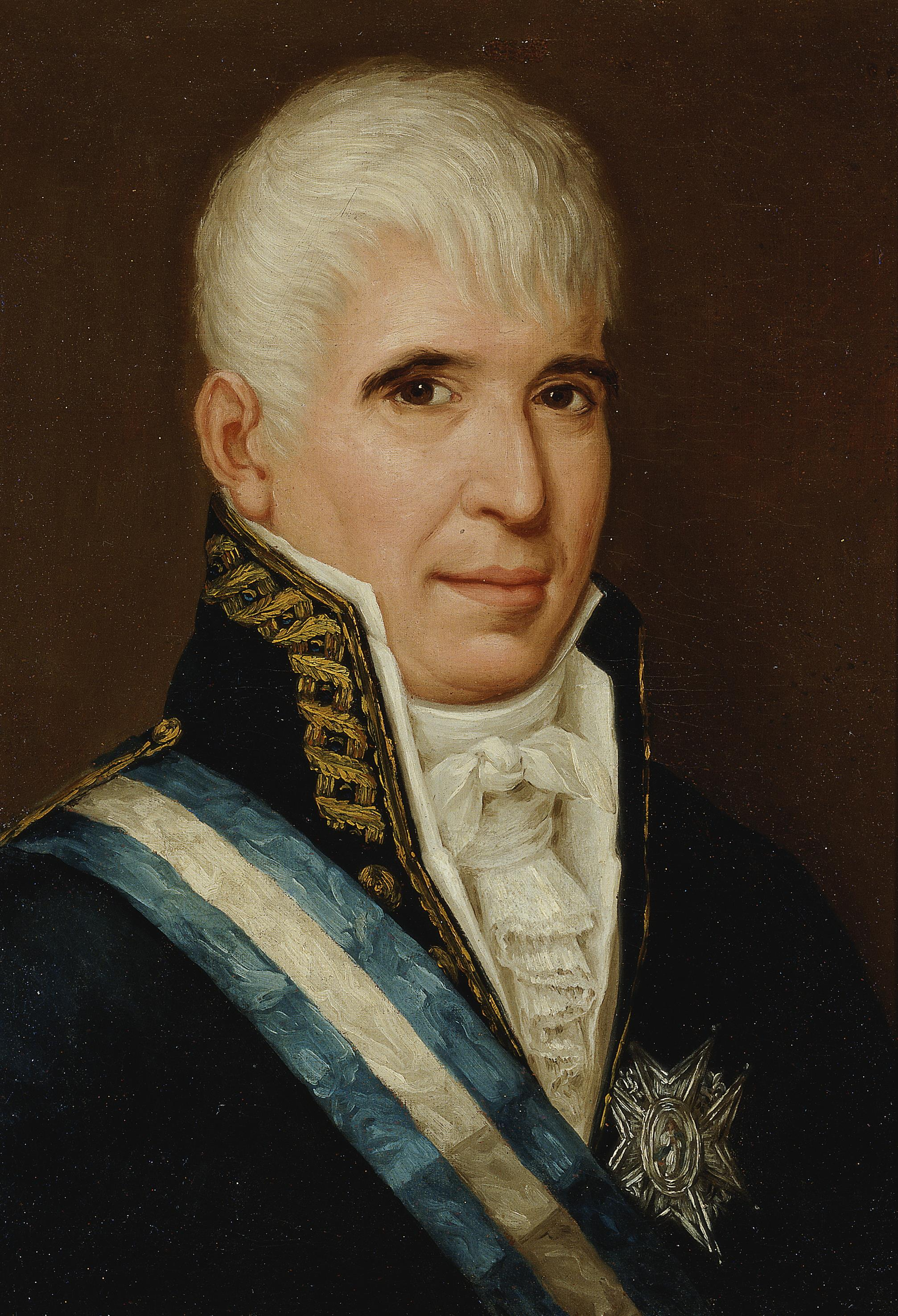
Francisco Saavedra (Prado museum).

== Later career ==
Over the next few months, while De Grasse went ahead with the plan, Saavedra made detailed preparations for the invasion of Jamaica. The defeat of the French fleet at the Battle of the Saintes in April 1782 was a major setback, but preparations continued. However, by the end of 1782 the Spanish government decided to abandon what looked likely to be a very costly project. From 1783 to 1788, Saavedra served as intendant of Caracas, following which he returned to Spain and became first a member of the Supreme War Council, then in 1797 Finance Minister, and the following year, Minister of State. However, his health was failing, so shortly afterwards he retired to Andalucia, only to come back to service in 1810 when Napoleon's French forces invaded Spain. He died on 25 November 1819.

Political offices
Preceded by Manuel Godoy	Secretary of State (Chief Minister); 1798–1799	Succeeded by Pedro Cevallos
