= Ferdinand VI =

King of Spain from 1746 to 1759

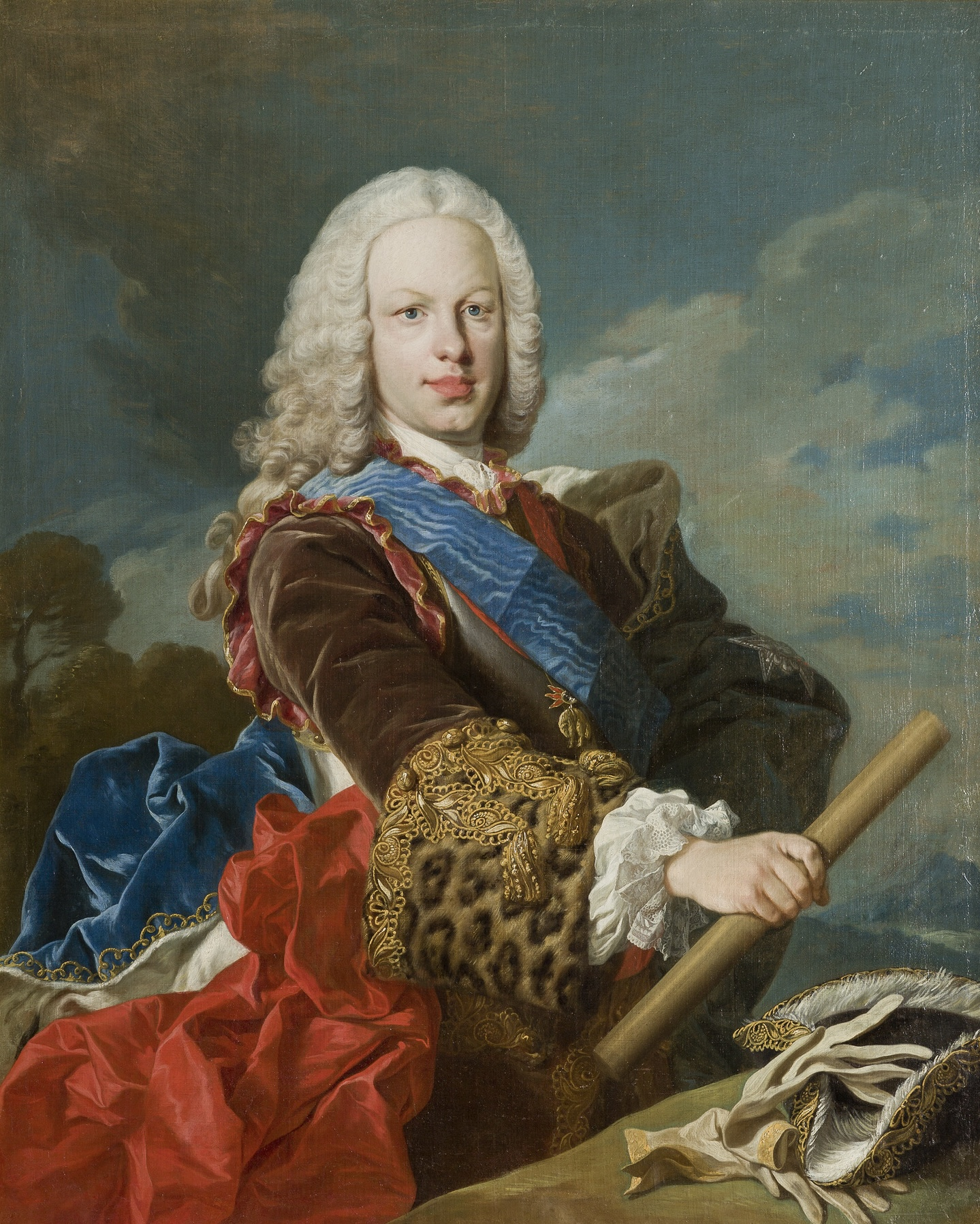
- Portrait by Louis Michel Van Loo, c. 1740

King of Spain
- Reign: 9 July 1746 – 10 August 1759
- Predecessor: Philip V
- Successor: Charles III
- Chief Ministers: See list: The Marquess of Villarías José de Carvajal The Duke of Alba Ricardo Wall
- Born: 23 September 1713; Royal Alcazar of Madrid, Spain
- Died: 10 August 1759 (aged 45); Villaviciosa de Odón, Madrid, Spain
- Burial: Convent of the Salesas Reales
- Spouse: Barbara of Portugal (m. 1729; died 1758)
Names
- Spanish: Fernando de Borbón y Saboya
- House: Bourbon
- Father: Philip V of Spain
- Mother: Maria Luisa of Savoy

Ferdinand VI (Spanish: Fernando; 23 September 1713 – 10 August 1759), called the Learned (el Prudente) and the Just (el Justo), was King of Spain from 9 July 1746 until his death in 1759. He was the third ruler of the Spanish Bourbon dynasty. He was the son of King Philip V and Queen Maria Luisa.

Ferdinand succeeded his father upon the latter's death in 1746. In 1749, he authorized a general imprisonment of the Roma (Gypsy), resulting in the imprisonment of 9,000. Otherwise, his reign proved peaceful as he successfully avoided involving Spain in any European conflicts. Moderate changes to Spain were initiated under the king, including reforms of taxation, advance commerce, and the Spanish navy, as well as a ban on freemasonry. However, the last years of Ferdinand's reign were marked by mental instability, much like his direct predecessor Philip V. Upon his death, Ferdinand was succeeded by his younger half-brother, Charles III.

== Early life ==
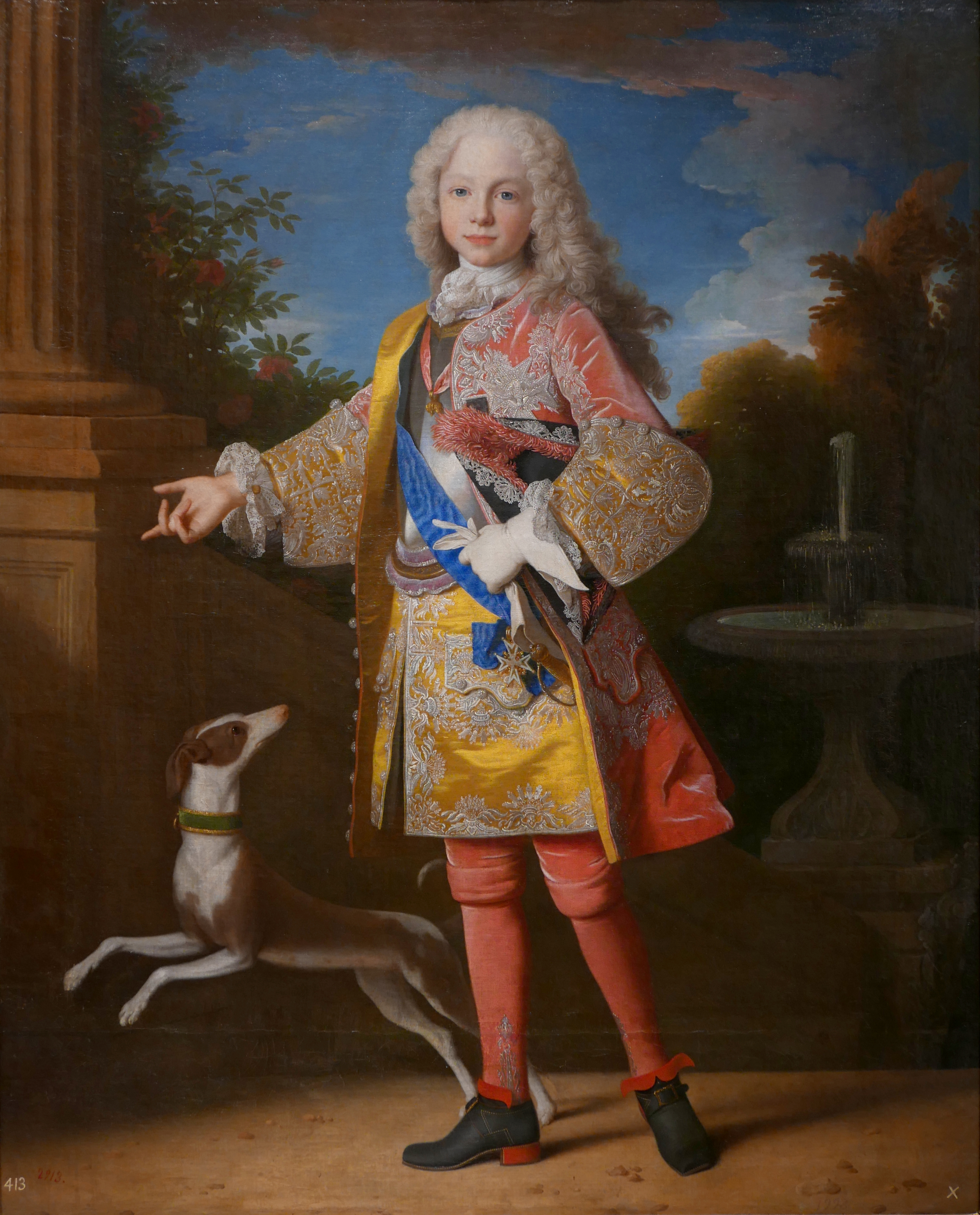
Infante Ferdinand, by Jean Ranc

Born at the Royal Alcázar of Madrid, Ferdinand was the last of the four sons that Philip V had in his first marriage to Maria Luisa of Savoy. The young infante endured a sad and lonely childhood. When he was just five months old, his mother died from tuberculosis, and seven months later, his father remarried the ambitious and domineering Elisabeth Farnese, who had no affection except for her own children, and looked upon Ferdinand and her other stepsons as an obstacle to their fortunes. The hypochondria of his father left Elisabeth mistress of the palace.

Philip, the second oldest of his three brothers, only lived for two weeks, dying before Ferdinand was born, while Philip Peter died at the age of 7, when Ferdinand was six years old. At the age of 10, Ferdinand became Prince of Asturias after his oldest brother, Louis, died of smallpox at the age of 17, after only seven months as King following the abdication of their father. But on Elizabeth's insistence, Philip returned to the throne. However, due to Philip V's declined mental condition, Elizabeth was the more proactive of the two.

Ferdinand, along with his brothers, the infantes, was tutored by the noble Giovanni Antonio Medrano. Ferdinand was by temperament melancholic, shy and distrustful of his own abilities. When complimented on his shooting, he replied, "It would be hard if there were not something I could do." Shooting and music were his only pleasures, and he was the generous patron of the famous singer Farinelli, whose voice soothed his melancholy.

=== Marriage ===
Ferdinand was married on January 20, 1729, to Infanta Barbara of Portugal, daughter of John V of Portugal and Maria Anna of Austria. He was sixteen and she was eighteen. The couple had no children.

== Reign ==
When Ferdinand came to the throne in 1746, Spain was embroiled in the War of the Austrian Succession, which ended with little benefit for Spain. He started his reign by eliminating the influence of his stepmother and her group of Italian courtiers. As king he followed a steady policy of neutrality in the conflict between the Kingdom of France and the Kingdom of Great Britain. He refused to be tempted by the offers of either kingdom into declaring war on the other.

Prominent figures during his reign were Marquis of Ensenada, a Francophile; and José de Carvajal y Lancáster, a supporter of the alliance with Great Britain. The fight between both ended in 1754 with the death of Carvajal and the fall of Ensenada, after which Ricardo Wall became the most powerful advisor to the monarch.

He felt the earthquake that struck Lisbon on 1 November 1755 whilst he was staying at Royal Monastery of El Escorial, and rushed to Madrid. There, he ordered all the local authorities across the country to complete a survey to ascertain the effects and casualties of the earthquake on the municipalities.

=== Reforms ===
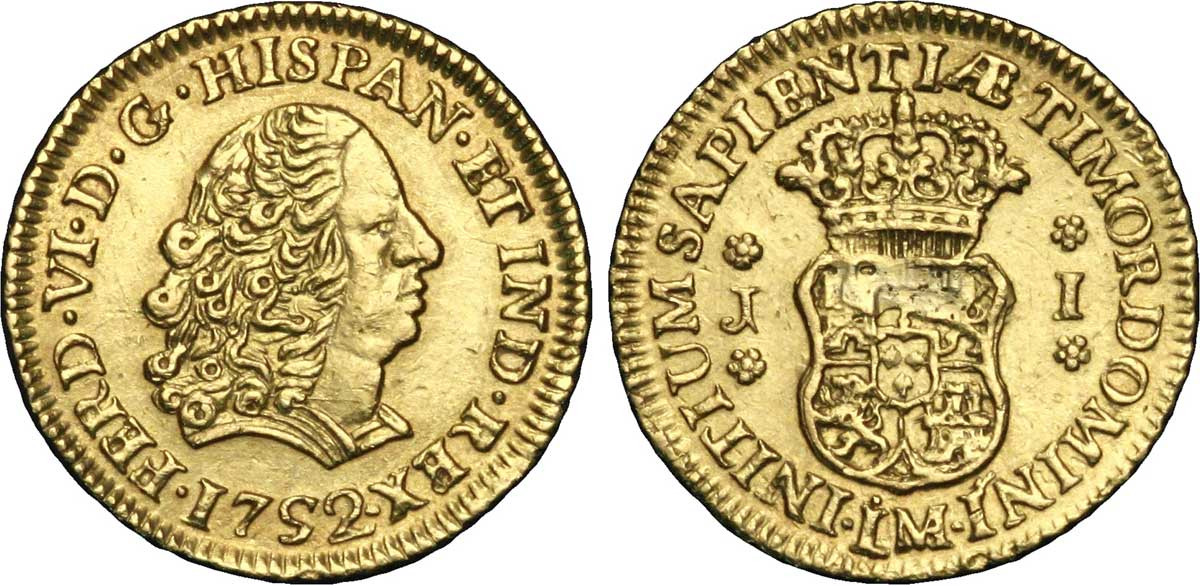
Ferdinand VI of Spain

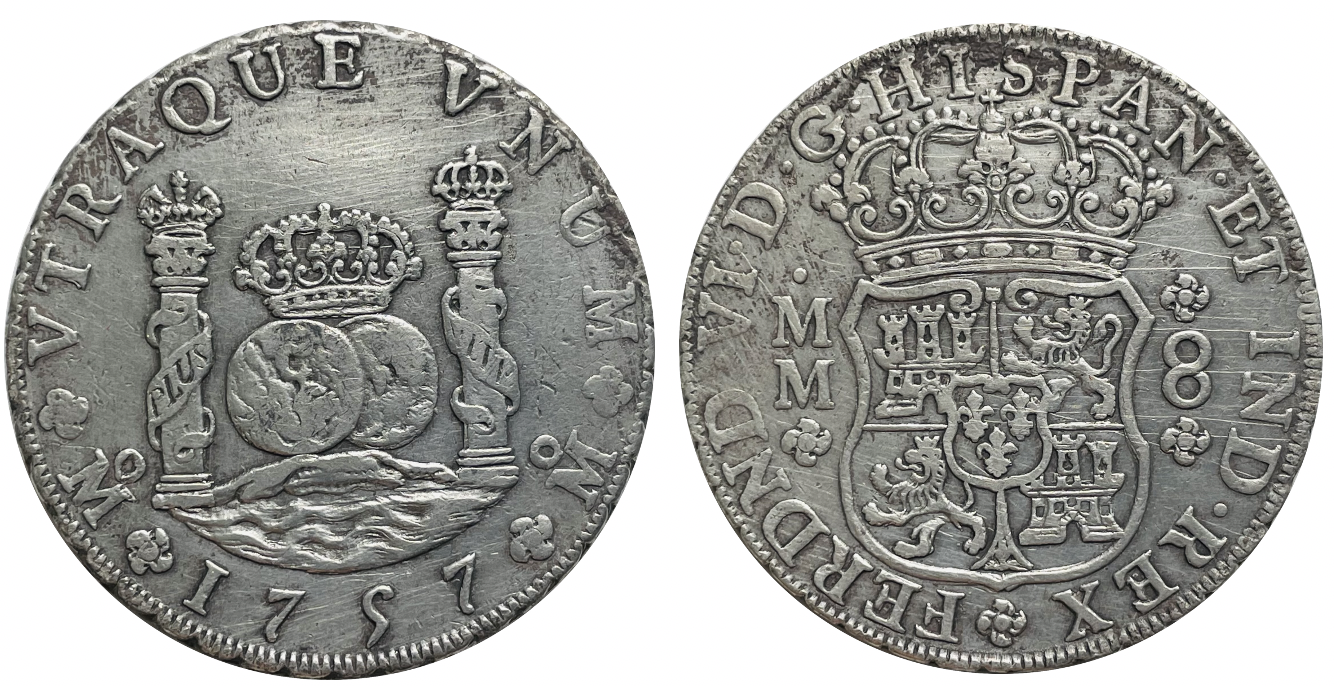
Silver coin: 8 reales of New Spain, minted during the reign of Ferdinand VI

The most important tasks during the reign of Ferdinand VI were carried out by the Marquis of Ensenada, the Secretary of the Treasury, Navy and Indies. He suggested that the state help modernize the country. To him, this was necessary to maintain a position of exterior strength so that France and Great Britain would consider Spain as an ally without supposing Spain's renunciation of its claim to Gibraltar.

A new model of the Treasury was suggested by Ensenada in 1749. He proposed substitution of the traditional taxes with a special tax, the cadastre, that weighed the economic capacity of each contributor based on their property holdings. He also proposed a reduction of subsidies by the state to the Cortes and the army. The opposition by the nobility caused the abandonment of the project.

In 1752, the bank Giro Real was created. It favored the transfer of public and private funds outside of Spain keeping all of the foreign exchanges in the hands of the Royal Treasury, enriching the State. It is considered the predecessor to the Bank of San Carlos, introduced during the reign of Charles III. Commerce was stimulated in the Americas, in an attempt to end the monopoly in the Indies and eliminate the injustices of colonial commerce. Ferdinand leaned toward registered ships rather than fleets of ships. The new system consisted of the substitution of the fleets and galleons so that a Spanish ship, previously authorized, could conduct trade freely in the Americas. This increased revenues and decreased fraud. Even so, this system provoked many protests among merchants in the private sector.

According to Ensenada, a powerful navy was fundamental to power of an overseas empire and aspirations of being respected by France and Great Britain. He increased the navy's budget and expanded the capacity of the shipyards of Cádiz, Ferrol, Cartagena and Havana which marked a commitment to extending the naval policies already underway in his predecessor's reign.

Church relations were really tense from start of the reign of Philip V because of the recognition of Charles of Austria as the King of Spain by the pope. A regalist policy was maintained that pursued as much political as fiscal objectives and whose decisive achievement was the Concord of 1753. From this the right of universal patronage was obtained from Pope Benedict XIV, giving important economic benefits to the Crown and a great control over the clergy.

King Ferdinand helped create the Royal Academy of the Fine Arts of San Fernando in 1752. The noted composer Domenico Scarlatti, music teacher to Queen Barbara, wrote many of his 555 harpsichord sonatas at Ferdinand's court.

=== Ban on freemasonry ===
In 1751, Ferdinand VI banned freemasonry in Spain, following a papal condemnation in 1738. During the reign of his successor, Charles III, freemasonry would make its return to Spain in a number of small lodges.

=== Foreign policy ===
Half escudo gold coin of Ferdinand VI, dated 1756

During the War of the Austrian Succession and the Seven Years' War, Spain reinforced its military might.

The main conflict was its confrontation with Portugal over the colony of Sacramento, from which British contraband was transferred down the Río de la Plata. In 1750 José de Carvajal helped Spain and Portugal strike a deal. Portugal agreed to renounce the colony and its claim to free navigation down the Río de la Plata. In return, Spain ceded to Portugal two regions on the Brazilian border, one in the Amazon and the other to the south, in which were seven of the thirty Jesuit Guaraní towns. The Spanish had to expel the missionaries, generating a conflict with the Guaraní people that lasted eleven years.

The conflict over the towns provoked a crisis in the Spanish Court. Ensenada, favorable to the Jesuits, and Father Rávago, confessor of the King and members of the Society of Jesus, were fired, accused of hindering the agreements with Portugal.

=== Hunting ===
As other Bourbon kings, he enjoyed hunting, a pastime recommended to fight familial hypochondria. The preserved 1745-1755 records of his hunts provide information about the biodiversity of the royal estates, mostly El Pardo, Casa de Campo, El Retiro. He hunted 75% of the days in the period, downing thousands of pieces every year.

=== Death ===
During his last year of reign, Ferdinand VI was rapidly losing his mental capacity and he was held in the Castle of Villaviciosa de Odón until his death on 10 August 1759. That period of time between August 1758 and August 1759 is known in Spanish historiography as the year without a king, due to the absence of the royal figure as ruler. The cause of the disease is still debated. Some authors suggest that the king suffered a depressive episode. The death of his wife Barbara, who had been devoted to him, and who carefully abstained from political intrigue, broke his heart. Between the date of her death in August 1758 and his own on 10 August 1759, he fell into a state of prostration in which he would not even dress, but wandered unshaven, unwashed and in a nightgown about his park.

Another opinion is that Ferdinand VI suffered a rapidly progressive clinical syndrome where behavioral disorganization with apathy and impulsivity, loss of judgment, and epileptic seizures of the right frontal lobe semiology were predominant. This semiology is highly suggestive of a right frontal lobe syndrome.

As the couple had no children, Ferdinand VI was succeeded as King by his half-brother Charles III.

== Legacy ==
Historian Stanley G. Payne regards him positively, writing that "The great virtue of Fernando VI as ruler was that he kept Spain at peace and avoided further entanglement in European struggles". However, he also notes that "The last five years of Fernando VI, who ultimately lapsed into madness like his father, were a time of vacuity and inaction."

=== In popular culture ===
A fictionalized version of Ferdinand VI appears in the 2011 adventure film Pirates of the Caribbean: On Stranger Tides. In the film, after learning about the discovery of the Fountain of Youth, Ferdinand (portrayed by Sebastian Armesto) sends his most trusted agent, known only as "The Spaniard", to find and destroy the Fountain, because he saw it as the abomination in the eyes of God. Also, his residence, for unknown reasons, is situated in Cádiz, not in Madrid, the capital of Spain.

== Heraldry ==
Heraldry of Ferdinand VI of Spain

Coat of arms as Infante of Spain

Coat of arms as Prince of Asturias

Coat of arms as King of Spain

== See also ==
- Capítulo Noble de Fernando VI

Ferdinand VI House of Bourbon Cadet branch of the Capetian dynasty Born: 23 September 1713 Died: 10 August 1759
Regnal titles
Preceded by Philip V	King of Spain; 1746–1759	Succeeded by Charles III
Spanish royalty
Preceded by Louis	Prince of Asturias; 1724–1746	Succeeded by Charles (IV)
