= And So Was His Grandfather =

Aquatint by Francisco de Goya

- Hasta su abuelo (Spanish)
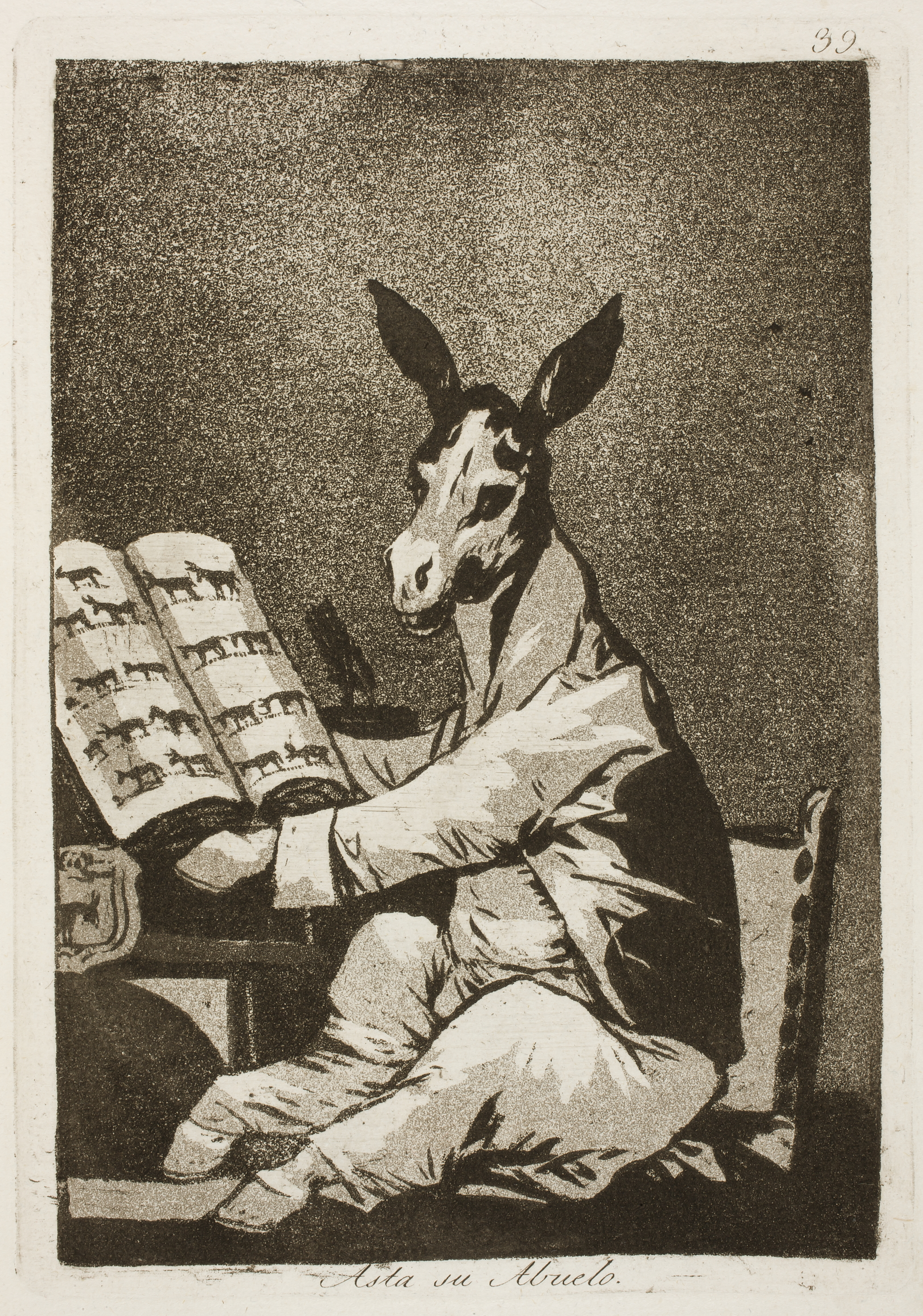
- Artist: Francisco Goya
- Year: 1797–99
- Type: Aquatint
- Medium: laid paper
- Dimensions: 21.4 cm × 15 cm (8 7/16 in × 5 7/8 in)
- Location: Various print rooms have a print from the first edition. The one illustrated is at the Museo del Prado

And So Was His Grandfather (Spanish: Hasta su abuelo) is an aquatint by the Spanish painter and printmaker Francisco Goya. Created between 1797 and 1799 for the Diario de Madrid, it is the 39th of the 80 aquatints making up the satirical Los caprichos.

The print is a satire on the Spanish nobility's obsession with ancestry and genealogical trees, and suggests that foolishness rather than nobility is hereditary. In particular, some have suggested that the print is aimed at the infamous politician Manuel Godoy, the prince of peace, who justified his rapid climb through the Spanish establishment by claiming descent from the Gothic kings of Spain. The use of a donkey to satirize the aristocracy was used on several of the Los caprichos prints.

It is one of only two prints in Los caprichos that was made purely by aquatint, without the use of etching.

== Preparatory drawings ==
Goya produced three preparatory drawings for And so was his grandfather, two in pencil and Indian ink and the other in gouache. The ink drawing is titled The Literary Ass. Neither of the drawings contain any discernible image on the book itself, suggesting the satire on genealogical pretension as opposed to pretension in general was unique to the print.

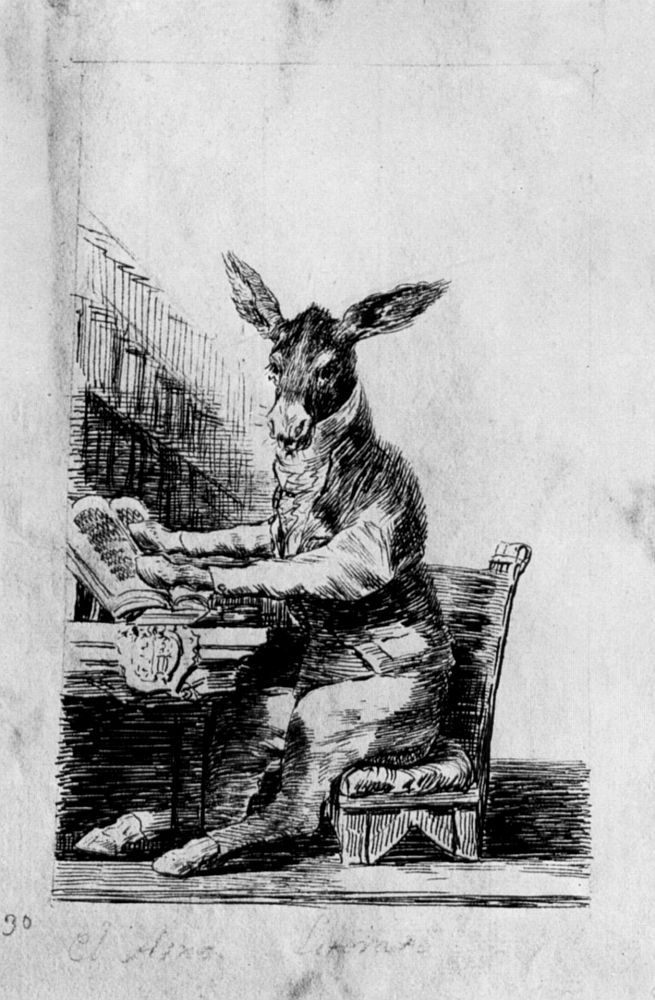

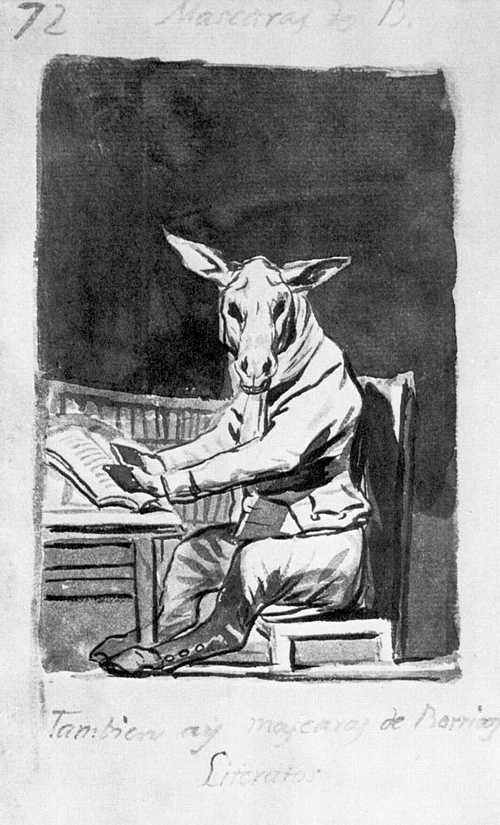

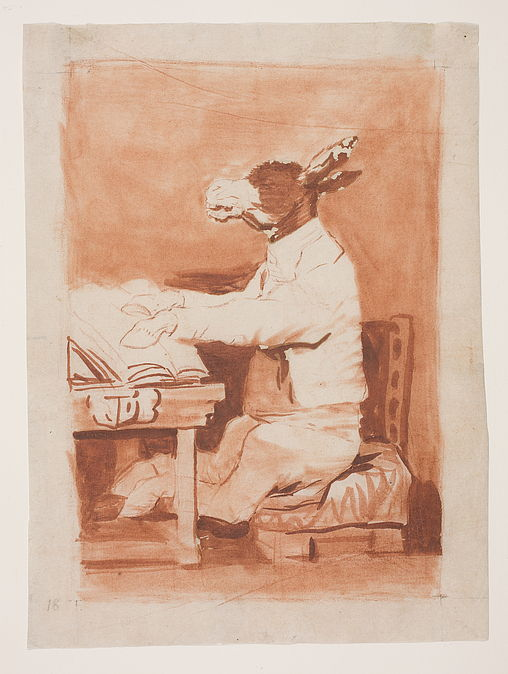

== See also ==
- List of works by Francisco Goya
