= Josefa de Godoy di Bassano, 2nd Viscountess of Rocafuerte =

Princess Josefa de Godoy di Bassano y Crowe, de Tudó y O'Donovan (October 8, 1834 – August 12, 1882), dei principi Godoy di Bassano, was a Spanish-Irish aristocrat. She was the 2nd Vizcondesa (Viscountess) de Rocafuerte (by rehabilitation of April 24, 1871) and 2??th Noble Dame of the Royal Order of Queen María Luisa.

== Family and early life ==
Josefa was born in Paris, the second daughter and second child of Manuel de Godoy di Bassano, 2nd Prince Godoy di Bassano, and Dona María Carolina Crowe y O'Donovan O'Neill. Her father was the son of Manuel de Godoy and Josefa de Tudó, born illegitimately while his father was still married to María Teresa de Borbón. Her maternal grandparents were Laurence Crowe, of County Clare, and St Stephen's Green, Dublin, and Lucinda O'Donovan O'Neill, of County Waterford, Ireland.

== Marriages ==
Josefa married twice. Her first husband was don Juan de Lara y Irigoyen, ... y ... (Vigo, May 17, 1808 – Madrid, October 4, 1869), whom she married in Montserrat, Barcelona, on December 18, 1856. He was Lieutenant-General of the Army, Minister of War, Captain-General of Valencia and Castilla la Nueva, Life Senator of the Realm, Grand Crosses of the Order of Charles III and the Order of St. Hermenegild. The marriage was childless.

She married secondly don Hermogenes García de Samaniego y del Castillo, Díez de Tejada y Centeno, in Madrid on October 29, 1873. Her second husband was Colonel of General Staff, Commander of the Order of Charles III (brother of the 1st Marqués de la Granja de Samaniego with a Coat of Arms of de Samaniego in Spain, previously a title of the Kingdom of the Two Sicilies, don Manuel García de Samaniego y del Castillo, Díez de Tejada y Centeno, Colonel of the Army, Knight of the Order of Santiago). This second marriage too was childless.

She died in Valladolid.

Spanish nobility
Preceded by Josefa de Tudó	Viscountess of Rocafuerte; 1871-1882	Succeeded by Manuel de Godoy di Bassano
