= Las majas =

Las majas refers to a pair of paintings by Francisco de Goya:

- La maja vestida
- La maja desnuda
