= María Martín-Romero, 5th Countess of Castillo Fiel =

María Martín-Romero, 5th Countess of Castillo Fiel (in full, Spanish: Doña María Martín-Romero y Godoy di Bassano-Crowe, quinta condesa de Castillo Fiel) (13 May 1856 – 26 November 1904), was a Spanish noblewoman.

María Martín-Romero was born in Madrid, the daughter of don Felix Martín y Romero (Superior Chief of Civil Administration [a senior civil servant], Commander of the Order of Charles III, Secretary of HCM [Her Catholic Majesty]) and of Matilde de Godoy di Bassano y Crowe, 4th Countess of Castillo Fiel (Paris, 1830 – Madrid, 1901).

== Marriage and children ==
On 7 December 1871, in Málaga, she married don Eduardo Antonio Crespo y Gálvez del Postigo (18 December 1838 - 8 November 1893), Alcalde of Málaga and Gentleman of the Chamber of HCM, and had three sons and one daughter:

- Alfonso Isabel Crespo y Martín-Romero, 6th Count of Castillo Fiel (18 February 1873 - ?), married in Madrid, on 8 May 1905 doña Isabel Gil-Delgado y Pineda (6 July 1870 - 24 January 1917), daughter of the Counts of Berberana, and they had an only son:

- Carlos Crespo, 7th Count of Castillo Fiel (1 June 1911 – 8 November 1963)

- Fernando Isabel Crespo y Martín-Romero (Málaga, 13 September 1874 - ?), married at Constantina, Seville, on 13 September 1903 doña María del Carmen García-Castrillón:

- Eduardo Crespo y García-Castrillón, 8th Count of Castillo Fiel (? – Madrid, 29 May 1989)
- María del Carmen Crespo y García-Castrillón

- María Serafina Crespo y Martín-Romero (Madrid, 26 February 1883 - ?), married in Madrid, on 25 April 1904 don Nicolás de Medina y Pardo de Donlebún:

- Cecilia de Medina y Crespo
- Luis de Medina y Crespo

- Luis María Crespo y Martín-Romero (Madrid, 16 July 1885 - ?), married doña María de la Cámara:

- Fernando Crespo y de la Cámara

== Sources ==
- Hobbs, Nicolas (2007). "Grandes de España" (in Spanish).
- Affonso, Domingos de Araújo; Valdez, Rui Dique Travassos (1938). Livro de Oiro da Nobreza (3 volumes) (in Portuguese). Vol. I. Lisbon. pp. 491–8.
- Instituto de Salazar y Castro. Elenco de Grandezas y Titulos Nobiliarios Españoles (in Spanish). periodic publication.

Spanish nobility
| Preceded by Matilde de Godoy di Bassano | Countess of Castillo Fiel; 1902-1904 | Succeeded by Alfonso Crespo |
