= Matilde de Godoy di Bassano, 4th Countess of Castillo Fiel =

Matilde de Godoy di Bassano, dei principi Godoy di Bassano 4th Countess of Castillo Fiel, (in full, Spanish: Doña Matilde de Godoy di Bassano y Crowe, de Tudó y O'Donovan, cuarta condesa de Castillo Fiel), (22 June 1830 - 1901) was a Spanish and Irish aristocrat.

She was born in Paris, the daughter of Manuel de Godoy di Bassano, 2nd Prince Godoy di Bassano and of María Carolina Crowe y O'Donovan O'Neill.

== Marriage and children ==
In 1853, she married 1st with Don Felix Martín y Romero, Superior Chief of Civil Administration (a high-level civil servant), Commander of the Order of Charles III, Secretary of HCM [Her Catholic Majesty] with exercise of Decrees, and had two daughters:

- María Martín-Romero, 5th Countess of Castillo Fiel
- Francisca Martin-Romero (19 September 1856, Madrid)

On 2 April 1875, she married 2nd Don Bernardo Bruzón y Rodriguez (a Genoese-Cuban landholder and industrialist), with issue. She died in Madrid.

== Sources ==
- Hobbs, Nicolas (2007). "Grandes de España" (in Spanish).
- Affonso, Domingos de Araújo; Valdez, Rui Dique Travassos (1938). Livro de Oiro da Nobreza (3 volumes) (in Portuguese). Vol. I. Lisbon. pp. 491–98.
- Instituto de Salazar y Castro. Elenco de Grandezas y Titulos Nobiliarios Españoles (in Spanish). periodic publication.

Spanish nobility
Preceded by Manuel de Godoy di Bassano	Countess of Castillo Fiel; 1888-1904	Succeeded by María Martín-Romero
