= Manuel de Godoy, 2nd Prince di Bassano =

Manuel Godoy y Tudó
- Prince of Bassano

2nd Prince of Bassano
- Tenure: 1851–1871
- Predecessor: Manuel de Godoy y Álvarez de Faria Rios
- Successor: Prince Manuel Godoy
- Born: 29 March 1805; Madrid, Spain
- Died: 24 August 1871 (aged 66); Madrid, Spain
- Spouse: María Carolina Crowe
- Issue: Prince Manuel Godoy di Bassano; Matilde dei principi Godoy di Bassano; Josefa dei principi Godoy di Bassano; Carlos dei principi Godoy di Bassano; María Luisa Cristina dei principi Godoy di Bassano
Names
- Manuel Luis de Godoy di Bassano
- House: Godoy
- Father: Manuel de Godoy y Álvarez de Faria Rios
- Mother: Josefa de Tudó, 1st Countess of Castillo Fiel
- Religion: Roman Catholic Church

Don Manuel Luis de Godoy y Tudó, Álvarez de Faria Rios y Catalán (March 29, 1805 in Madrid – 24 August 1871 in Madrid) was a Spanish aristocrat, son of Manuel de Godoy, Prince of the Peace and his second wife Josefa de Tudó, 1st Countess of Castillo Fiel, Dama de Honor de Su Majestad la Reina y Dama Noble de la Orden de Maria Luisa.

He inherited his mother's titles and / or representations and solely his father's Italian titles and dignities, the one which could only be used through male line, and was 2nd Principe de Bassano y Principe Romano de Godoy (1851), 2nd Conde de Castillo Fiel with a Coat of Arms of de Tudó (of which was passed a successory Royal Order on 28 October 1870, not getting to receive Royal Dispatch for having died almost subsequently), Knight of the Habit of the Spanish Military Order of Santiago (1867), Bailly Great Cross of the Order of St. John of Jerusalem, Commander of the Order of Christ in Rome, and the Order of Avis in Portugal, etc.

== Marriage and children ==
On 15 November 1827, in Paris, he married María Carolina Crowe y O’Donovan O’Neill (London, 1807 – Paris, 4 December 1878), an Irish-Spanish (who was maid of honour to the Empress Eugénie de Montijo), the daughter of Sir Lawrence Crowe, Lord of St Stephen's Green House, and Lucinda O’Donovan O’Neill, both from Dublin, Ireland, and had five children:

- Manuel de Godoy di Bassano, 3rd Prince Godoy di Bassano
- Matilde de Godoy di Bassano, 4th Countess of Castillo Fiel
- Josefa de Godoy di Bassano, 2nd Viscountess of Rocafuerte
- Don Carlos de Godoy de Bassano y Crowe dei principi Godoy di Bassano, (Roma, 12 December 1835 – La Habana, 1 March 1862), married in 1859 with Doña Francisca Díaz Cañizares y de Pina. His only daughter, Doña Francisca de Godoy y Diaz Cañizares, still living in 1871 in San Jose de Arroyo Blanco, Santo Spiritus, La Habana, Cuba, where she died later.
- Donna María Luisa Cristina (Marie Louise Christine) de Godoy de Bassano y Crowe, de Tudó y O'Donovan, dei principi Godoy di Bassano, (Marseille, 12 January 1839 – Paris, 28 January 1880), married firstly in Paris, on 4 August 1859 Ernest Alexandre Louis Charles Napoléon Auguste, Prinz von Looz und Corswarem (Bonlez, 5 September 1834 – Bonlez, 12 December 1868), son of Charles Franz Wilhelm Ferdinand 6th Herzog von Looz und Corswarem, and wife Hermine Anna Gertrude Jacqueline Baronne van Lockhorst, and had three children, secondly with William Abbott, without issue, and thirdly with Richard Seaver, Major of the British Army, without issue:
  - Charles Emmanuel Ernest Alexander Arnold 8th Herzog von Looz und Corswarem (in succession of his uncle the 7th Herzog Charles Leopold August Ludwig Philipp, who deceased leaving only female issue now extinct) (Chateau de Niel, Paris, 15 April 1860 – 8 August 1946), etc., married in Paris, 25 January 1890, annulled by trial of 20 February 1891, Maria Helena de Portugal de Faria, 1st Pontificious Countess de Portugal de Faria (Lisbon, 19 March 1866 – 20 November 1957), daughter of Augusto de Faria, 1st Visconde de Faria, and wife Maria do Ó Barreiros Arrobas de Portugal da Silveira de Barros e Vasconcelos, without issue
  - Manuela Prinzessin von Looz und Corswarem (Chateau de Niel, Paris, 5 November 1861 – 31 January 1919), married on 13 June 1881 Henri André Othon, Baron de Bogaerde de Terbruggen (? – 26 September 1896)
  - Ludwig Prinz von Looz und Corswarem (Bonlez, Belgique, 20 March 1867 – 15 July 1921), unmarried and without issue

Italian nobility
Preceded by Manuel de Godoy	Prince; Godoy di Bassano; 1851-1871	Succeeded by Manuel de Godoy di Bassano
Spanish nobility
Preceded by Josefa de Tudó	Count of Castillo Fiel; 1869-1871	Succeeded by Manuel de Godoy di Bassano
