= Josefa de Tudó, 1st Countess of Castillo Fiel =

Spanish noblewoman (1779–1869)

Her Highness Josefa de Tudó Princess of Bassano Duchess of Alcudia Duchess of Sueca
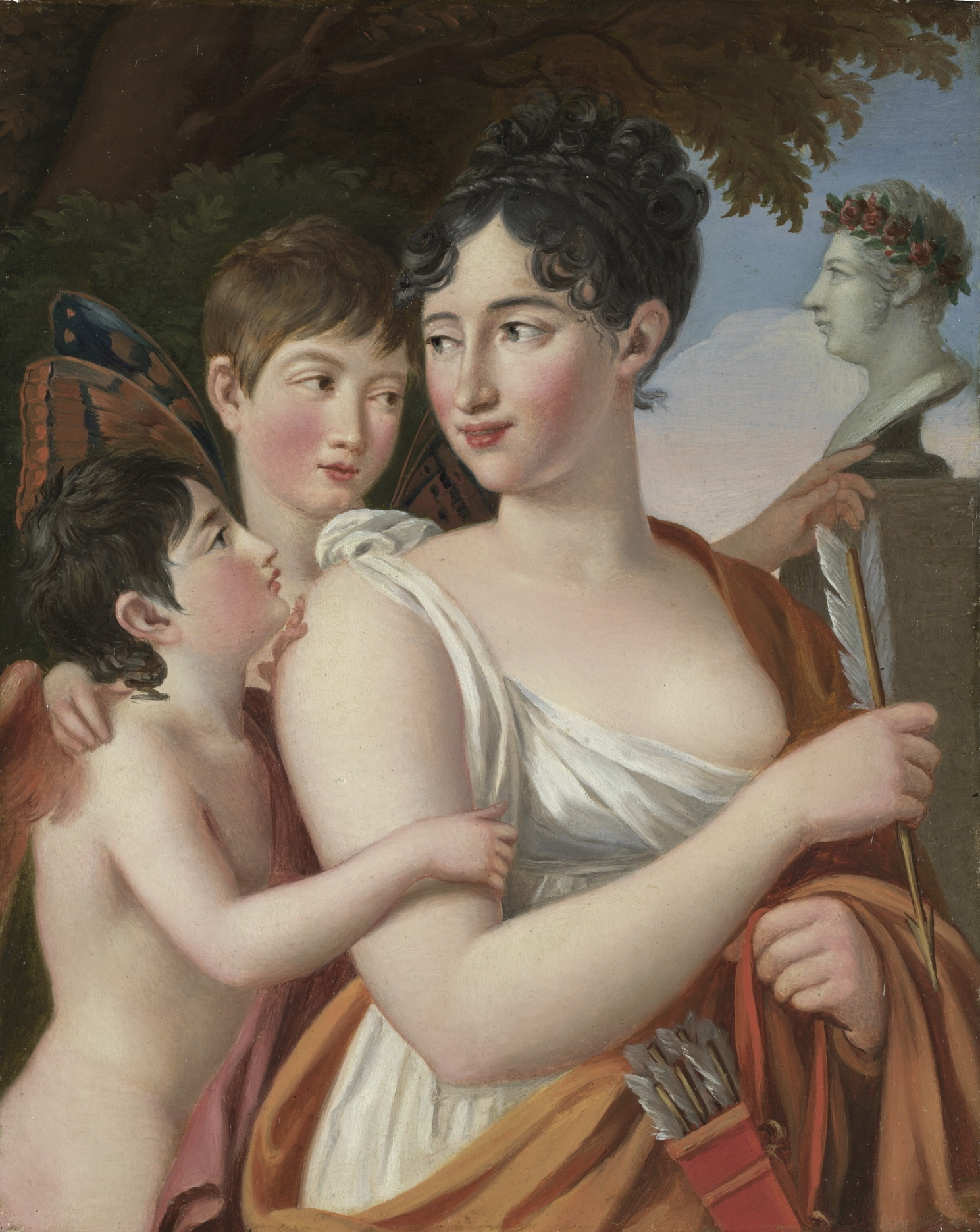
- Portrait of doña Josefa Tudó (c. 1812) by José de Madrazo. Museo del Prado.
- Born: Josefa Petra Francisca de Paula de Tudó y Catalán; 19 May 1779; Cádiz, Spain
- Died: 20 September 1869 (aged 90); Madrid, Spain
- Occupation(s): Lady-in-waiting, art model
- Spouse: Manuel Godoy
- Parent(s): Antonio de Tudó y Alemany and Catalina Catalán y Luesia

Josefa de Tudó y Catalán, 1st Countess of Castillo Fiel, (Note: Name in full: Spanish: Doña Josefa Petra Francisca de Paula de Tudó y Catalán, Alemany y Luesia, primera condesa de Castillo Fiel, primera vizcondesa de Rocafuerte.) also known as Pepita Tudó (19 May 1779 – 20 September 1869), was the second wife of Spanish Prime Minister Manuel de Godoy.

It has been suggested she was the model for two paintings by Goya, La maja desnuda (The Naked Maja) and La maja vestida (The Clothed Maja).

== Biography ==
Tudó was born in Cádiz and she was always called "Pepita", a diminutive of Josefa. Her father was a gunner named Antonio de Tudó y Alemany who died when she was young. From the age of sixteen, Pepita and her mother, Catalina Catalán y Luesia, and her sisters, Magdalena and Socorro, lived in the house of Manuel de Godoy, one of the most powerful men in Spain. By 1800, Pepita had become Godoy's mistress.

However, the Queen of Spain, María Luisa, forced Godoy to marry María Teresa de Borbón y Vallabriga, Countess of Chinchón, a marriage which was favorable to Godoy for social reasons. The marriage did not end Godoy's relationship with Pepita; in 1805, she gave birth to a son, Manuel, and in 1807, she gave birth to another son, Luis.

In 1807, under Godoy's influence, Carlos IV presented Pepita with the title of Countess of Castillo Fiel and Viscountess of Rocafuerte. When María Teresa died in November 1828, Godoy and Pepita could finally marry, even though they had secretly performed a marriage ceremony years earlier. The following year or possibly even that same December, Godoy and Pepita married. The Pope made him 1st Principe di Paserano; however, they moved to Paris in 1832 where they lived in somewhat straitened circumstances. Godoy was later given a pension by Louis Philippe I.

Later, Pepita returned to Spain in hopes of reclaiming the family properties. At the age of 90, Pepita told a reporter that Godoy had only one true love: Queen María Luisa.

The Fundación Lázaro Galdiano in Madrid has a miniature, Portrait of Josefa Tudó Cathalán Alemani, condesa de Castillofiel, attributed to Ducker, painted around 1805.

== In popular culture ==
Pepita is considered by many historians to be the model for one of Francisco de Goya's most notorious works, La maja desnuda.

The writer Ceferino Palencia wrote a play called Pepita Tudó, and casting his half-Scottish wife Isabel Oyarzábal Smith in the titular role in the 1930s.

Pepita Tudó was portrayed by Penélope Cruz in the 1999 film Volavérunt.

== Gallery ==
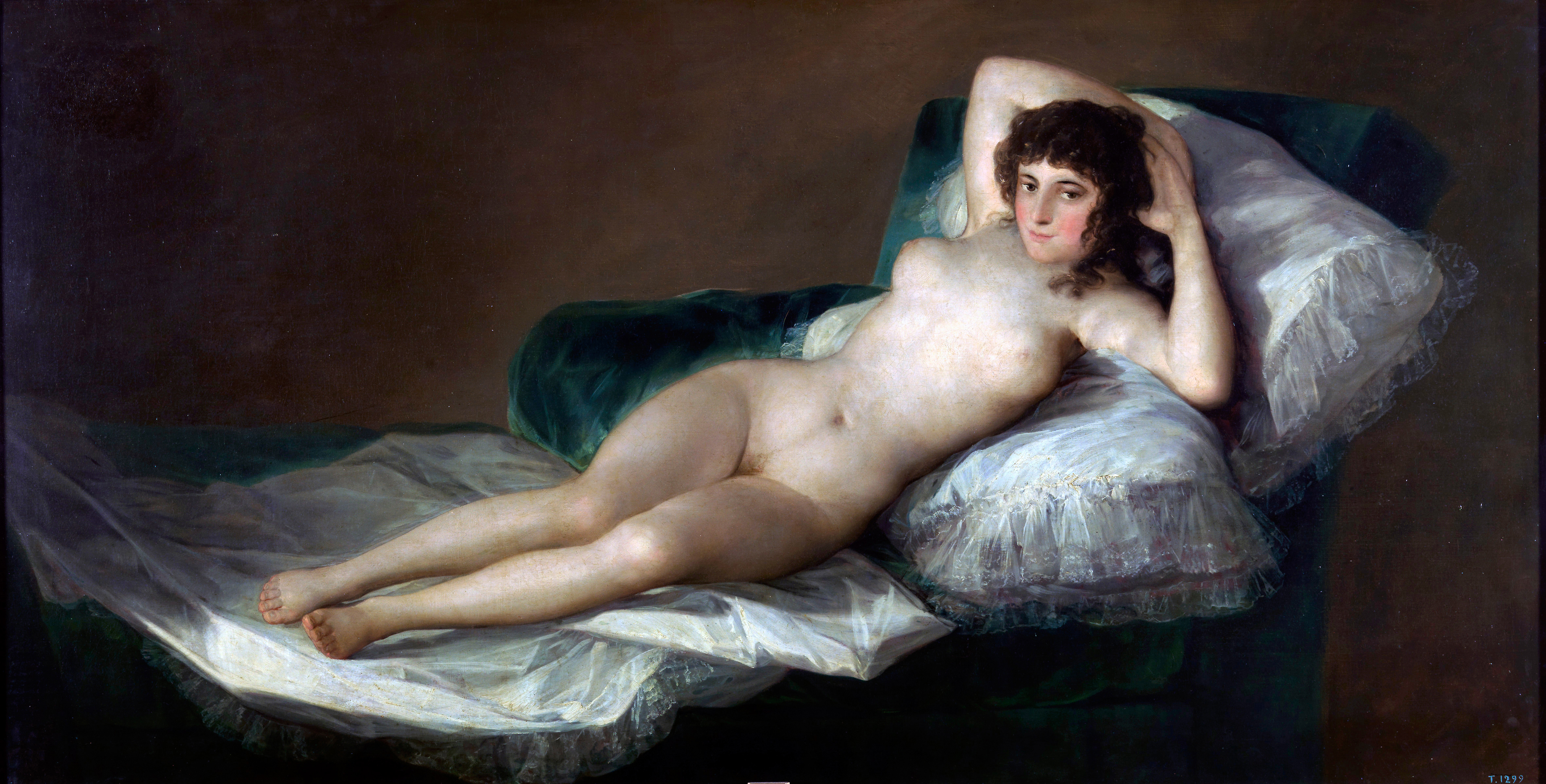
La maja desnuda (Goya)

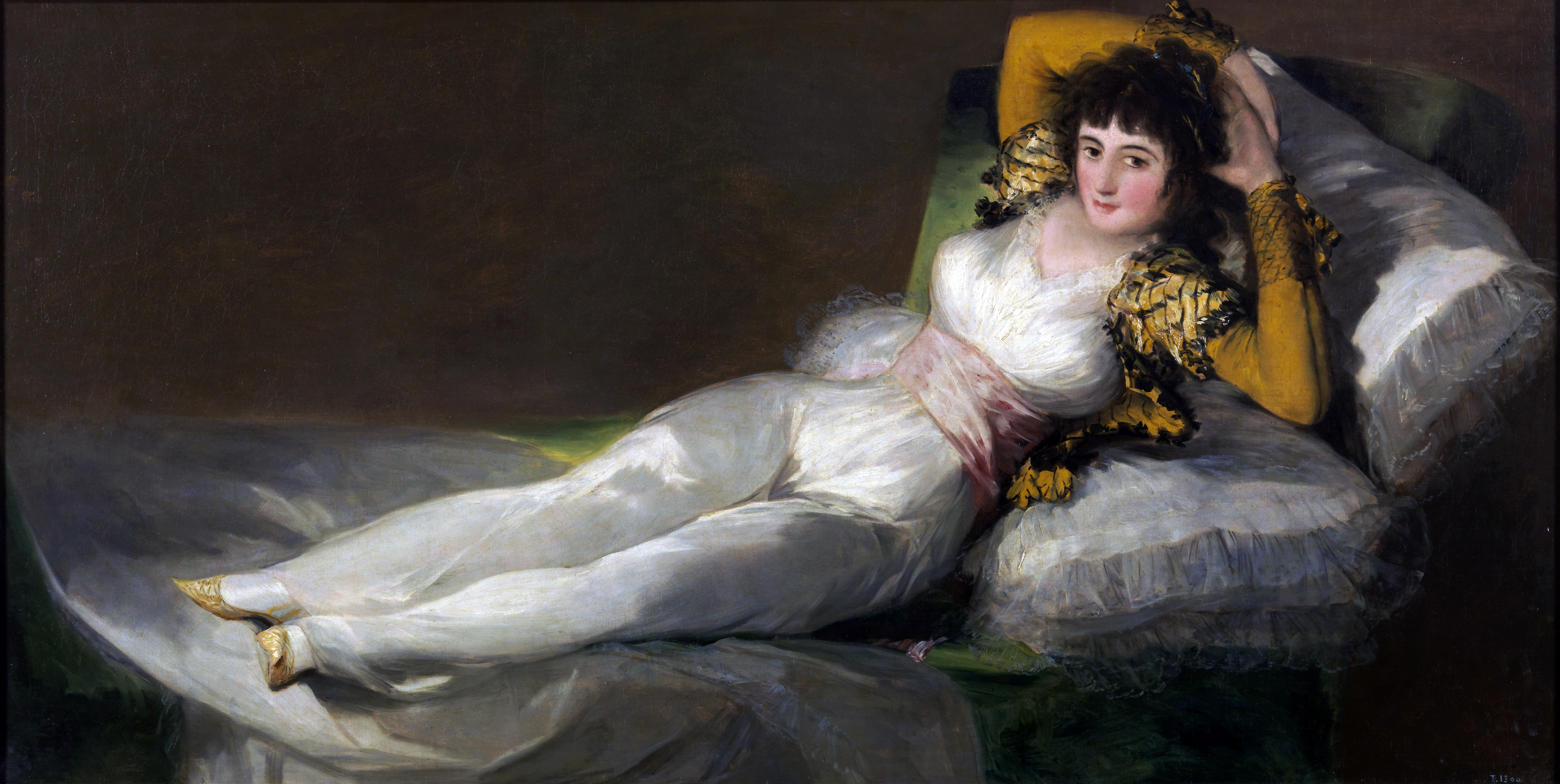
La maja vestida (Goya)

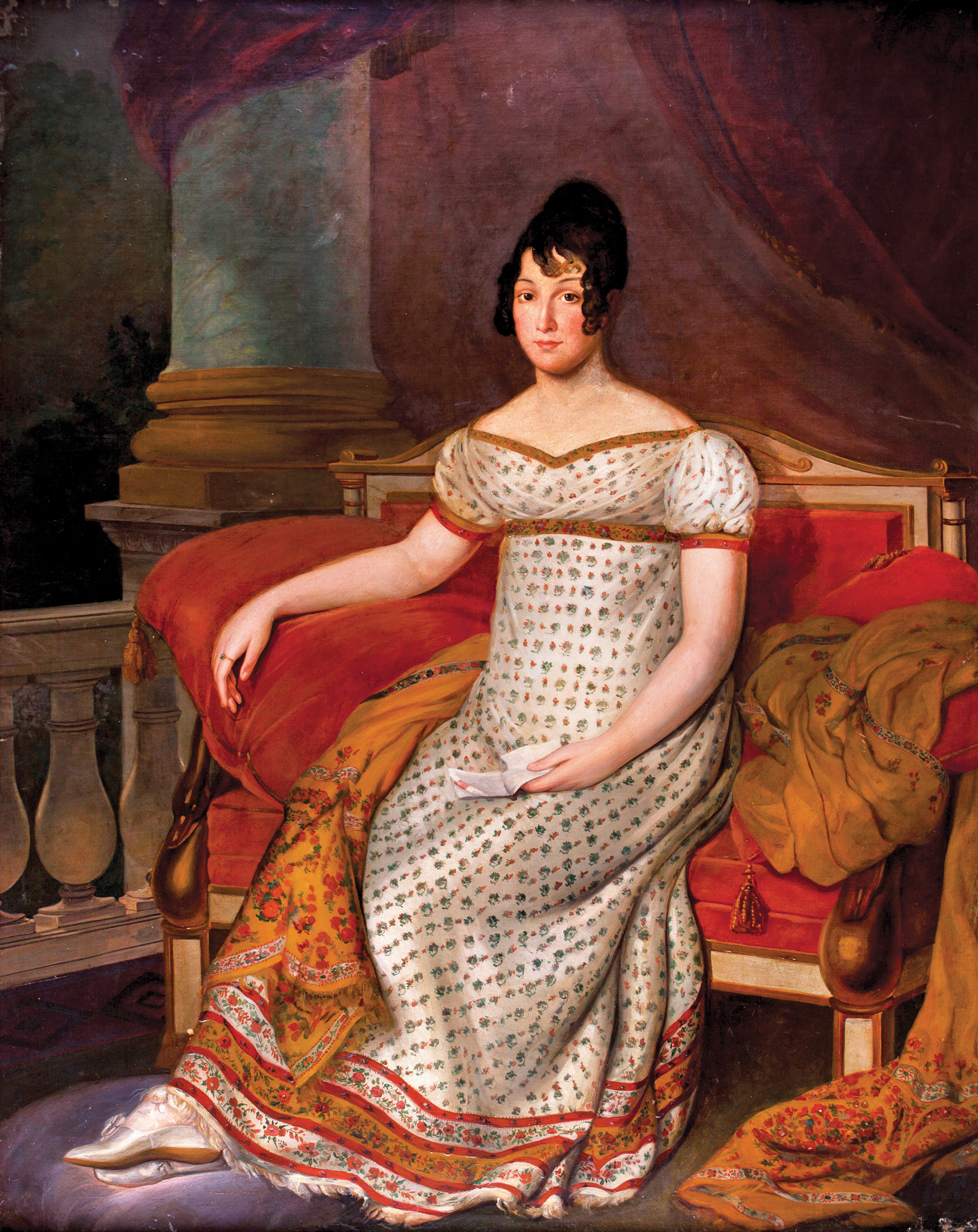
Portrait of Josefa Tudó (c. 1810–15) by José de Madrazo

== Notes ==
Spanish nobility
New title	Countess of Castillo Fiel; 1807-1869	Succeeded by Manuel de Godoy di Bassano
New title	Viscountess of Rocafuerte; 1807-1869	Succeeded by Josefa de Godoy di Bassano
