= La maja vestida =

Painting by Francisco Goya

The Clothed Maja
- La maja vestida (Spanish)
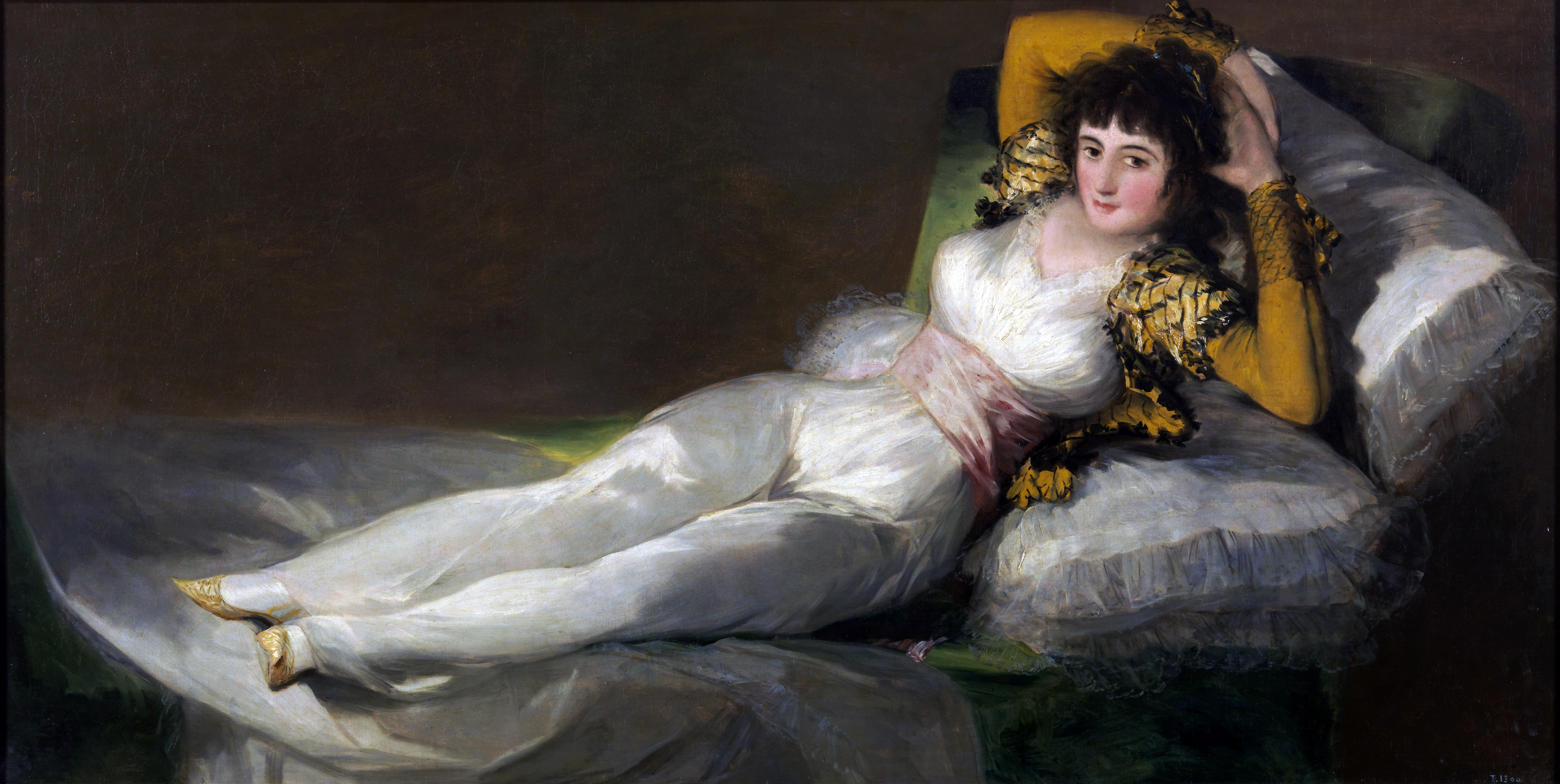
- Artist: Francisco Goya
- Year: 1800–1805
- Medium: Oil on canvas
- Dimensions: 97 cm × 190 cm (38 in × 75 in)
- Location: Museo del Prado; Madrid

La maja vestida (English translation: The Clothed Maja) is an oil painting on canvas created between 1800 and 1807 by the Spanish Romantic painter and printmaker Francisco Goya. It is a clothed version of the earlier La maja desnuda, which was created between 1795 and 1800. The identity of the model and that of the commissioner have not been confirmed. However, art historians and scholars have suggested she is María Cayetana de Silva or Godoy's mistress Pepita Tudó.

The paintings were never publicly exhibited during Goya's lifetime, so it is also unknown if they were created as pendant paintings, to be displayed as a pair. However, since 1901 they have been exhibited together at the Museo Nacional del Prado in Madrid. Beforehand, it was twice in the collection of the Royal Academy of Fine Arts of San Fernando, also in Madrid, before being "sequestered" by the Spanish Inquisition between 1814 and 1836. The maja vestida and maja desnuda were both first cited in an 1808 inventory, when Godoy's assets were seized by King Ferdinand VII.

== Background ==
The origins of both paintings are unclear, with some sources claiming they were commissioned by the Prime Minister Manuel de Godoy for his private collection. This claim would suggest the woman in the paintings to be Pepita Tudó, the mistress of Godoy. However, Lion Feuchtwanger, a Bavarian novelist and playwright, cites in his book Goya (1951) that Godoy allegedly purchased both of the paintings from the heirs of María Cayetana de Silva, the 13th Duchess of Alba, after her death in 1802. The Duchess of Alba and Goya were rumored to have a prolonged and passionate affair after he had been commissioned to paint a portrait of the Duchess. Evidence of their affair comes from personal letters written by Goya where he states, "Now I know how it feels to live". Another piece of evidence comes from a 1797 portrait where she is wearing two rings, one inscribed 'Goya' and the other 'Alba', on her hand pointing down towards a hidden inscription at her feet that says, "Only Goya".

== Reception ==
The first written account of the vestida dates back to an 1808 inventory of Godoy's assets after their seizure by Ferdinand VII. Frederic Quillet had been tasked by his commander, Joseph Bonaparte, to make an inventory of Godoy's private collection during the French occupation of Spain. The vestida and desnuda were categorized as the Naked Gypsy/Venus and the Clothed Gypsy/Venus. They were considered by the French ruling class to be "obscene".

== See also ==
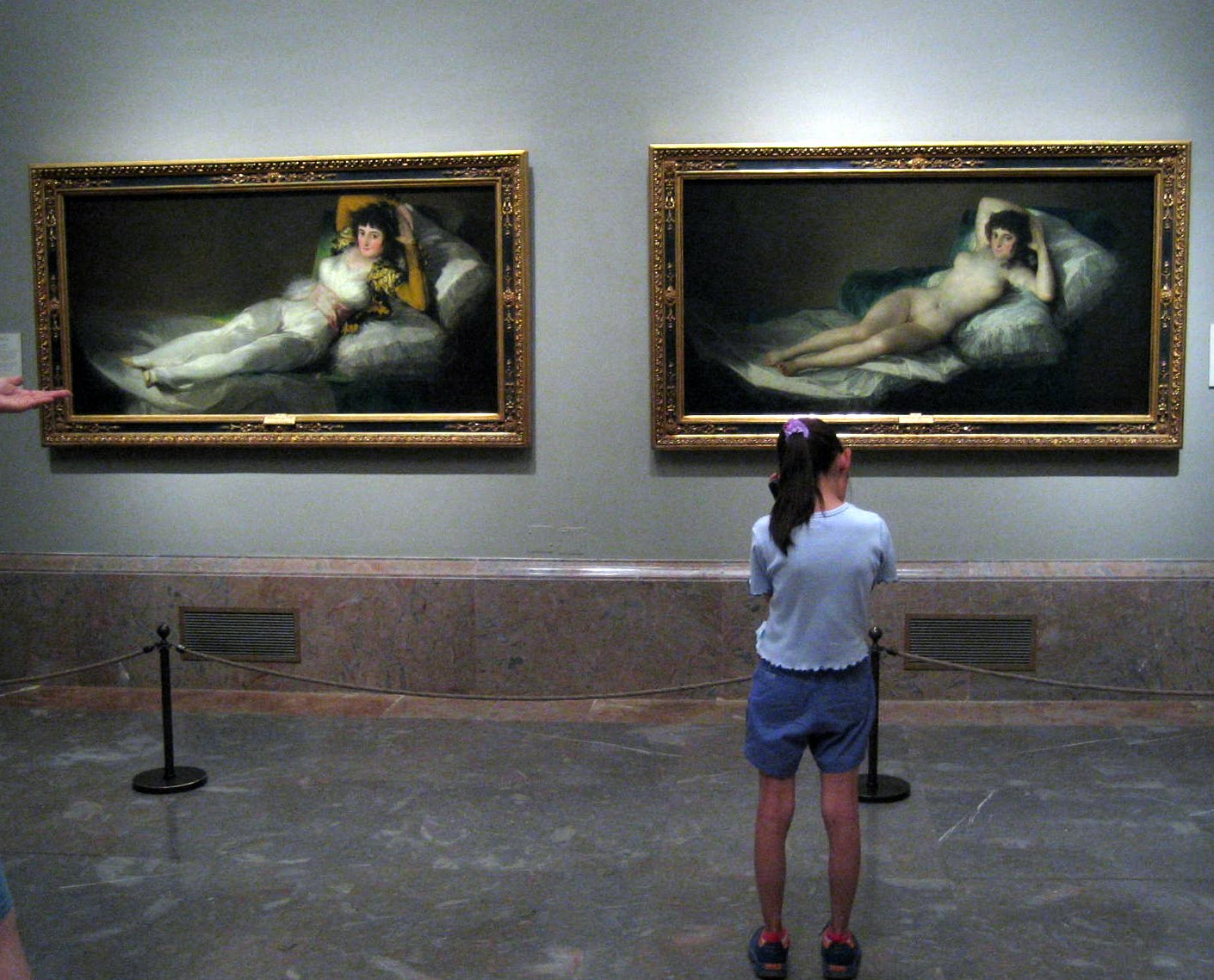
View of the two paintings side by side

- La maja desnuda (stamps of Spain)
- List of works by Francisco Goya
