= Alfonso Crespo, 6th Count of Castillo Fiel =

Alfonso Crespo, 6th Count of Castillo Fiel, (in full, Spanish: Don Alfonso Crespo de Gálvez y Martín-Romero Godoy, sexto conde de Castillo Fiel), (18 February 1873 – ?), was a Spanish nobleman.

Crespo was born in Málaga, the son of don Eduardo Antonio Crespo y Gálvez del Postigo, and of María Martín-Romero y Godoy di Bassano, 5th Countess of Castillo Fiel. He succeeded to his mother titles in 1904, and was given the Coat of Arms of Tudó by Royal Order of 29 October 1906. He was Governor of Ávila, Gentleman of the Chamber of HM with exercise and Grand Cross of the Order of Agricultural Merit.

He married in Madrid, on 8 May 1905 Doña Isabel Gil-Delgado y Pineda (6 July 1870 - 24 January 1917), daughter of the Counts of Berberana, and they had an only son: Carlos Crespo, 7th Count of Castillo Fiel

== Sources ==
- Hobbs, Nicolas (2007). "Grandes de España" (in Spanish). Archived from the original on 25 October 2008.
- Affonso, Afonso Domingos de Araújo; Valdez, Rui Dique Travassos (1938). Livro de Oiro da Nobreza (3 volumes) (in Portuguese). Vol. I. Lisbon. pp. 491–98.
- Instituto de Salazar y Castro. Elenco de Grandezas y Titulos Nobiliarios Españoles (in Spanish). periodic publication.

Spanish nobility
Preceded by María Martín-Romero	Count of Castillo Fiel; 1904-1904	Succeeded by Carlos Crespo
