= Eduardo Crespo, 8th Count of Castillo Fiel =

Don Eduardo Crespo y García-Castrillón (? – 29 May 1989 in Madrid) was a Spanish aristocrat, son of Don Fernando Isabel Crespo y Martín-Romero and wife Doña María del Carmen García-Castrillón y ..., and paternal grandson of Don Eduardo Antonio Crespo y Gálvez del Postigo and wife Doña María Martín-Romero y Godoy di Bassano, 5th Countess of Castillo Fiel.

He was 8th Conde de Castillo Fiel with a Coat of Arms of de Tudó (8 November 1963). He married María Luisa Sampere Marzal (member of the rural landowning Marzal family of Olivenza, Province of Badajoz). It is not known if he had children. The title ended upon his death.

== Sources ==
- Hobbs, Nicolas (2007). "Grandes de España" (in Spanish).
- Affonso, Domingos de Araújo; Valdez, Rui Dique Travassos (1938). Livro de Oiro da Nobreza (3 volumes) (in Portuguese). Vol. I. Lisbon. pp. 491–8.
- Instituto de Salazar y Castro. Elenco de Grandezas y Titulos Nobiliarios Españoles (in Spanish). periodic publication.

Spanish nobility
Preceded by Carlos Crespo	Count of Castillo Fiel; 1963-Present	Incumbent
