= Manuel de Godoy di Bassano, 3rd Prince Godoy di Bassano =

Manuel Godoy y Crowe
- Prince of Bassano

3rd Prince of Bassano
- Tenure: 1871–1896
- Predecessor: Prince Manuel Godoy
- Successor: Manuel Godoy IV Prince Godoy di Bassano, Barrister/Corregidor (immigrated to Chile)
- Born: October 31, 1828; Paris, France
- Died: 14 April 1896 (aged 67)
- Spouse: María del Pilar de Sola y Fuentes; Rosine Stoltz
Names
- Manuel Carlos Luis de Godoy di Bassano
- House: Godoy
- Father: Prince Manuel Godoy
- Mother: María Carolina Crowe

Manuel de Godoy di Bassano, 3rd Prince de Godoy di Bassano, (in full, Spanish: Don Manuel Carlos Luis de Godoy di Bassano y Crowe, de Tudó y O'Donovan, tercer principe de Godoy di Bassano, tercer conde de Castillo Fiel, caballero de la orden de San Juan de Jerusalen y de la orden de Felipe el Magnanimo), (31 October 1828 - 14 April 1896) was a Spanish and Italian aristocrat.

He was born in Paris, the son of Manuel de Godoy di Bassano, 2nd Prince de Godoy di Bassano and of Lady María Carolina Crowe y O'Donovan O'Neill, Dama de Honor de la Emperatriz Eugenia de Montijo. He was 3rd and last Principe de Godoy di Bassano, 3rd Conde de Castillo Fiel with a Coat of Arms of de Tudó (Royal Order of 21 December 1871, Knight of the Order of St. John of Jerusalem and Knight First Class of the Order of Philip the Magnanimous of the Grand Duchy of Hesse and by Rhine (formerly Darmstadt), etc.

Manuel de Godoy di Bassano married first in 1856 with Doña María del Pilar de Sola y Fuentes, with issue died in his lifetime, and married second, in Pamplona on 2 March 1878, with Doña Rosina Carolina Victoria Nöel y Stoltz, Freifrau [Baroness] von Ketschendorf und Stoltzenau, without issue.

== Sources ==
- Hobbs, Nicolas (2007). "Grandes de España" (in Spanish).
- Affonso, Domingos de Araújo; Valdez, Rui Dique Travassos (1938). Livro de Oiro da Nobreza (3 volumes) (in Portuguese). Vol. I. Lisbon. pp. 491–8.
- Instituto de Salazar y Castro. Elenco de Grandezas y Titulos Nobiliarios Españoles (in Spanish). periodic publication.

Italian nobility
Preceded by Manuel de Godoy di Bassano	Prince; Godoy di Bassano; 1871-1896	
Spanish nobility
Preceded by Manuel de Godoy di Bassano	Count of Castillo Fiel; 1871-1896	Succeeded by Matilde de Godoy di Bassano
