= Carlos Crespo, 7th Count of Castillo Fiel =

Spanish aristocrat

Don Carlos Crespo y Gil-Delgado, Martín-Romero y Piñeda (1 June 1911 – 8 November 1963) was a Spanish aristocrat, son of Alfonso Isabel Crespo y Martín-Romero, 6th Count of Castillo Fiel, and wife dona Isabel Gil-Delgado y Piñeda.

He was 7th Conde de Castillo Fiel with a Coat of Arms of de Tudó. He married María Teresa Tricio y Echeguren. He was succeeded by his first cousin, Eduardo Crespo y García-Castrillón, 8th Count of Castillo Fiel (8 November 1963).

== Sources ==
- Hobbs, Nicolas (2007). "Grandes de España" (in Spanish).
- Affonso, Domingos de Araújo; Valdez, Rui Dique Travassos (1938). Livro de Oiro da Nobreza (3 Volumes) (in Portuguese). Vol. I. Lisbon. pp. 491–8.
- Instituto de Salazar y Castro. Elenco de Grandezas y Titulos Nobiliarios Españoles (in Spanish). periodic publication.

Spanish nobility
Preceded by Alfonso Crespo	Count of Castillo Fiel; 1902-1963	Succeeded by Eduardo Crespo
