= La maja desnuda =

Painting by Francisco de Goya

The Naked Maja
- La maja desnuda (Spanish)
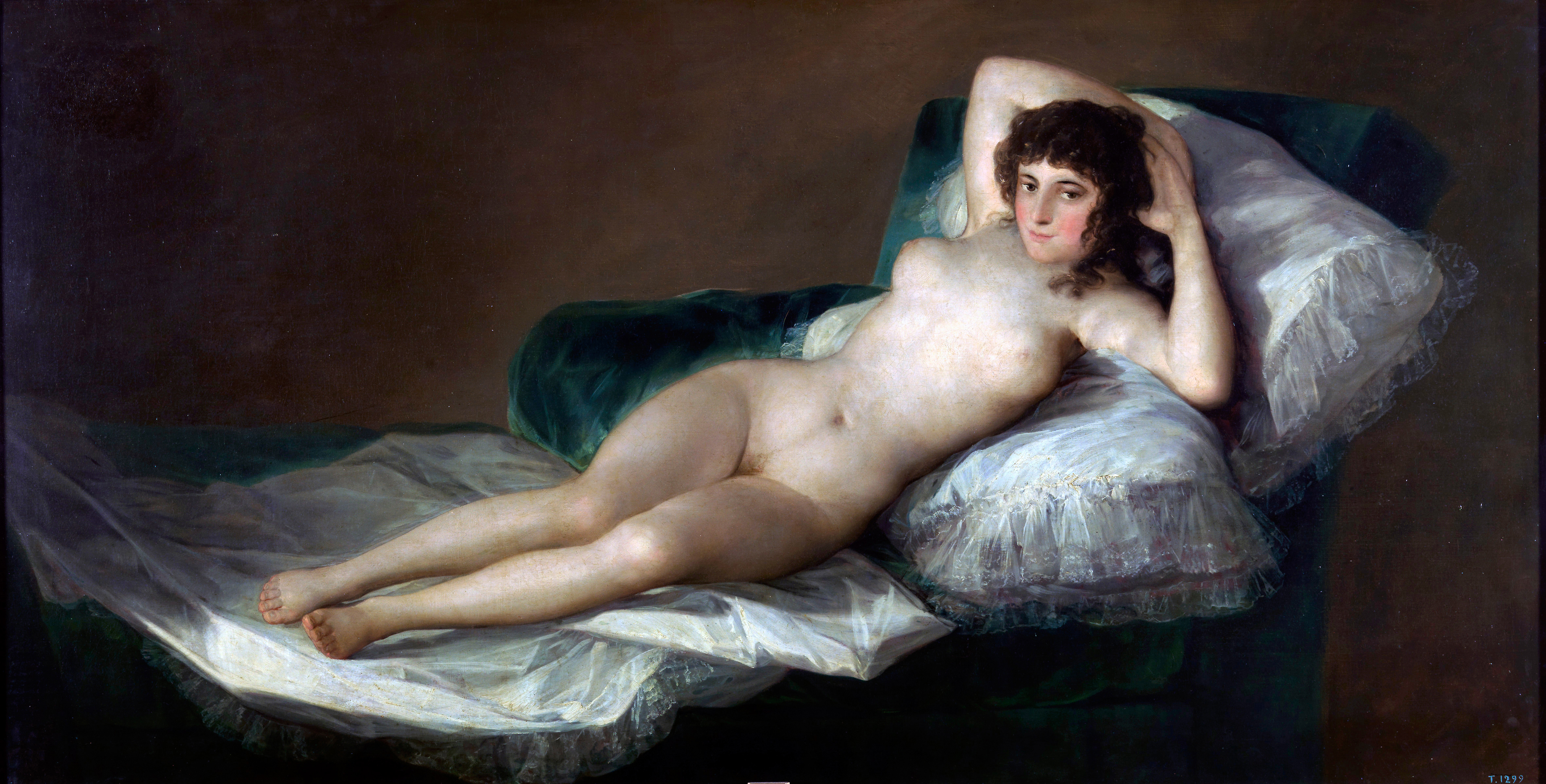
- Artist: Francisco Goya
- Year: 1797–1800
- Medium: Oil on canvas
- Dimensions: 97 cm × 190 cm (38 in × 75 in)
- Location: Museo del Prado, Madrid

The Naked Maja or The Nude Maja (Spanish: La maja desnuda [la ˈmaxa ðesˈnuða]) is an oil-on-canvas painting made around 1797–1800 by the Spanish artist Francisco Goya, and has been in the Museo del Prado in Madrid since 1901. It portrays a nude woman reclining on a bed of pillows, and was probably commissioned by Manuel Godoy, to hang in his private collection in a separate cabinet reserved for nude paintings. Goya created a pendant of the same woman identically posed, but clothed, known today as La maja vestida (The Clothed Maja), also in the Prado, and usually hung next to La maja desnuda. The subject is identified as a maja or fashionable lower-class Madrid woman, based on her costume in La maja vestida.

== Description ==
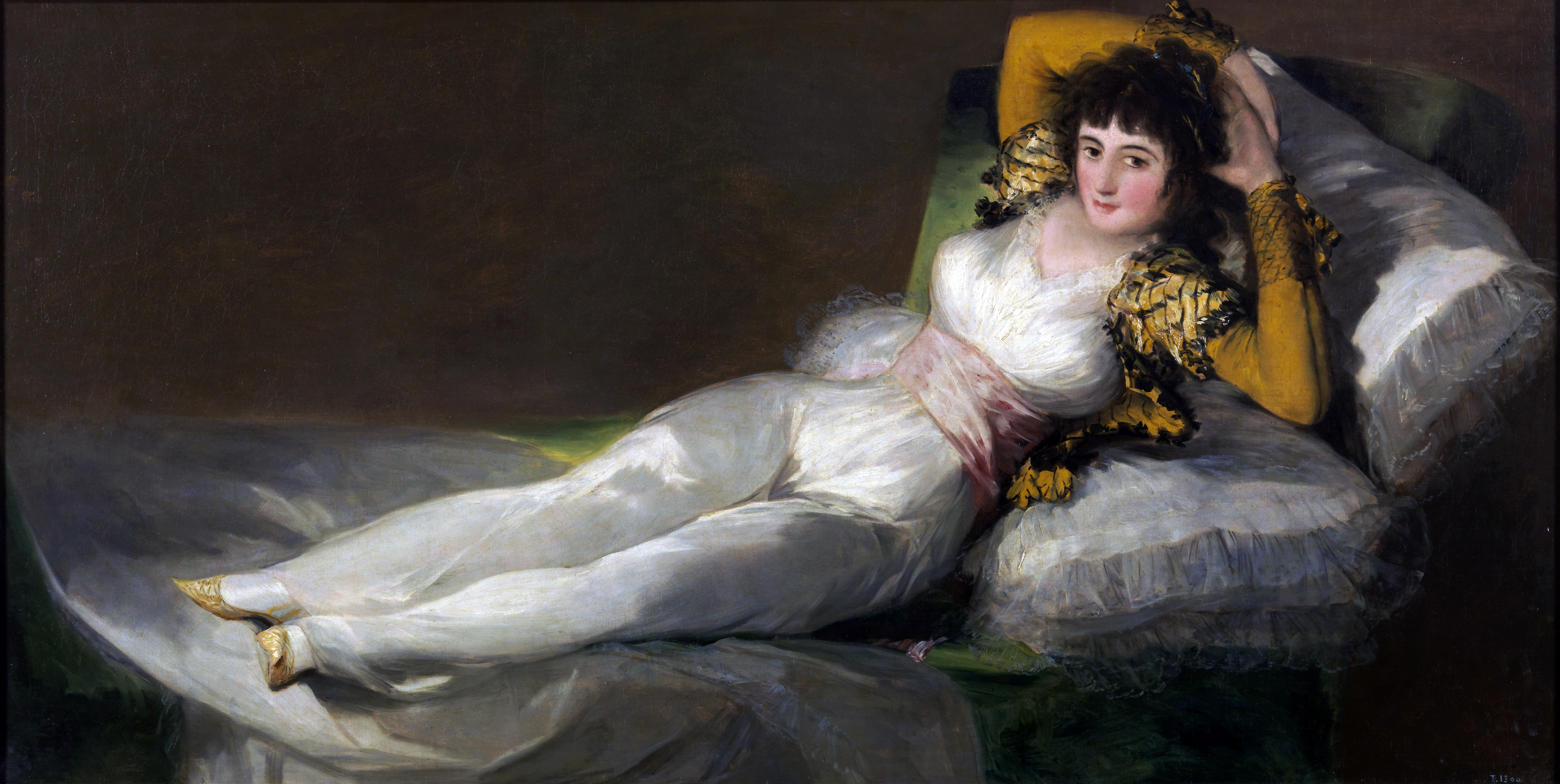
La maja vestida, c. 1803. Museo del Prado, Madrid.

Although the two versions of the Maja are the same size, the sitter in the clothed version occupies a slightly larger proportion of the pictorial space; according to art historian Janis Tomlinson she seems almost to "press boldly against the confines of her frame", making her more brazen in comparison to the comparatively "timid" nude portrait.

The painting carries many of the traditions of depictions of the nude in Spanish art, but marks a clear break in significant ways, especially in her bold gaze. Further, the accompanying pendant showing a woman in contemporary dress makes it clear that the focus of the work is not of a mythological subject, as in Velázquez's Rokeby Venus, but in fact of a nude Spanish woman. More obviously, while Velázquez painted his Venus revealing only her back, Goya's portrait is a full frontal view. Goya's figuration is short and angular, while Velázquez's is elongated and curved, and his figure placed on richly coloured satin, which starkly contrasts to the bare white cloths Goya's maja rests on.

== Inquisition ==
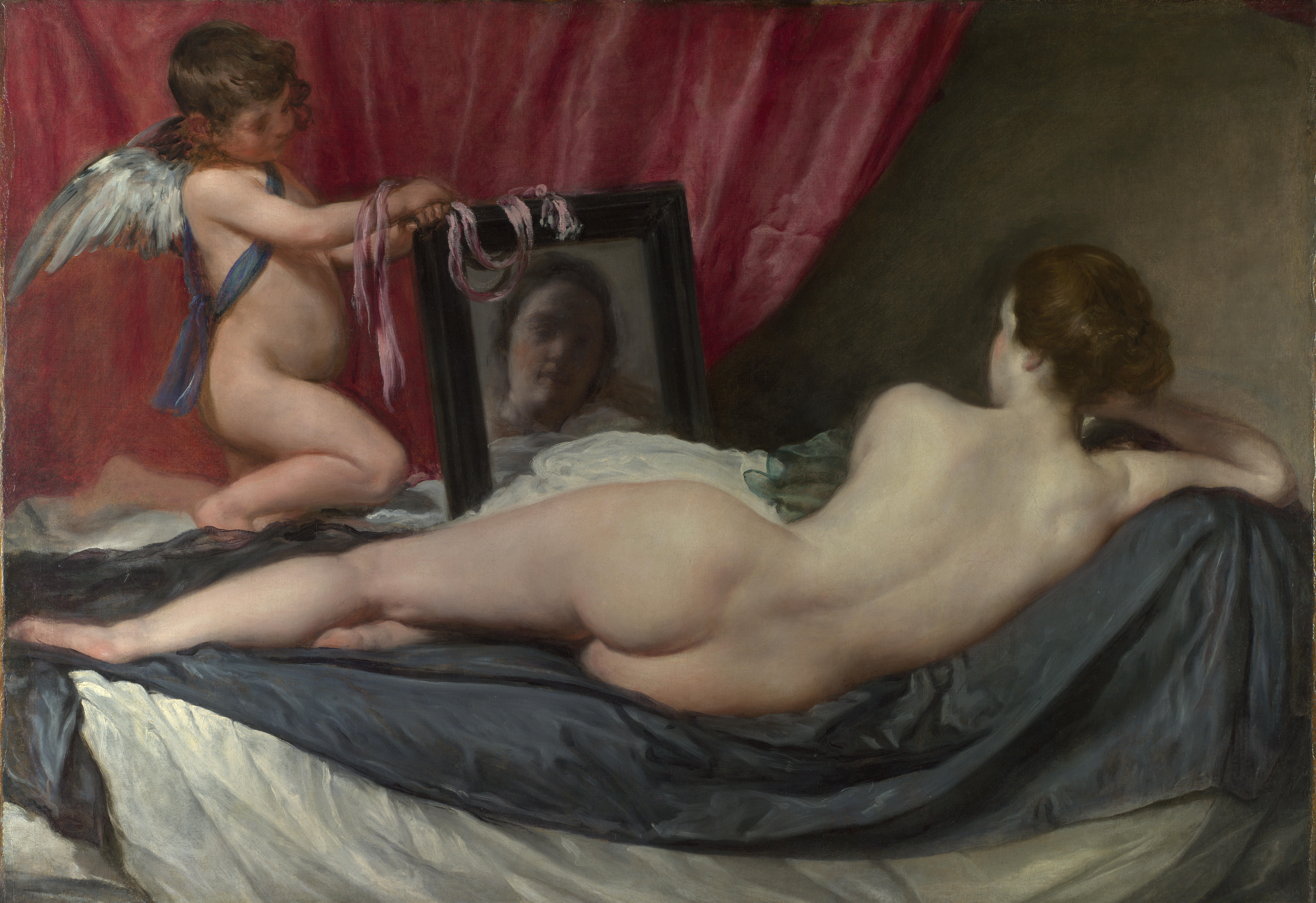
Diego Velázquez, Rokeby Venus, c. 1647–51. National Gallery, London.

The identity of the model and why the paintings were created are today unknown. Both paintings are first recorded in an inventory of "unpopular and unsuccessful art" in 1800 by Manuel Godoy, Duke of Alcúdia and prime minister of Spain, when they were hung in a private room reserved for nude paintings, alongside such works as Velázquez's Rokeby Venus. Godoy retained the picture for six years before it was discovered by investigators for the Spanish Inquisition in 1808, along with his other "questionable pictures". Godoy and the curator of his collection, Don Francisco de Garivay, were brought before a tribunal and forced to reveal the artists behind the confiscated art works which were "so indecent and prejudicial to the public good."

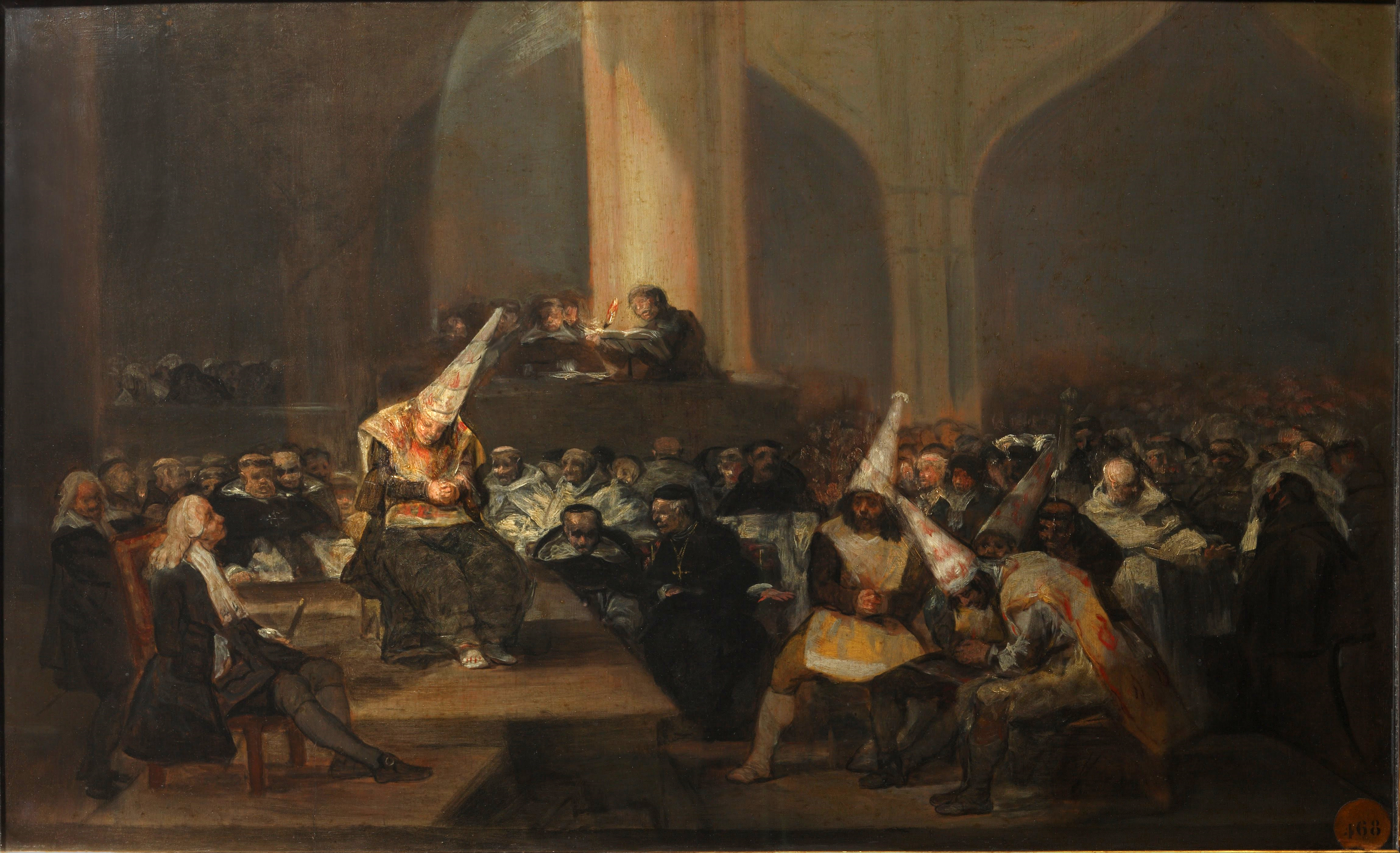
Goya, The Inquisition Tribunal, c. 1808–12. Goya detested the inquisition and depicted it in harsh terms a number of times, and satirised it in works such as his c. 1820–1823 Witches' Sabbath.

The controversy was populist and driven by a political motive, following a mob gathering demanding Godoy's removal as prime minister. In the fallout, Goya was named and summoned on a charge of moral depravity. As Godoy had only been found in possession of the painting, Goya was asked to identify why "he did them", and also "at whose request, and what attention guided him." His answers do not survive, but it is known that the Director of Confiscations accepted that Goya had followed and emulated Titian's Danaë series (some paintings of which remained in the Spanish royal collection) and Velázquez's Rokeby Venus (which belonged to the collection of the Dukes of Alba prior to 1802). These two painters, including their nudes, were admired by the court and church, and the Inquisition had previously found nothing objectionable in the Rokeby Venus.

Goya escaped prosecution when the tribunal accepted that he was following in a tradition, and emulating a Velázquez painting which had been favoured by Philip IV of Spain. The earlier picture of Venus had been similarly kept out of view by that art-loving king in a private room, "the room where His Majesty retires after eating." In fact, the Inquisition by 1808 was nearing the end of its influence, and while it could draw attention to "dangerous" forms of expression, be they books, plays, or paintings, it was usually unable to fully suppress them.

== Provenance ==
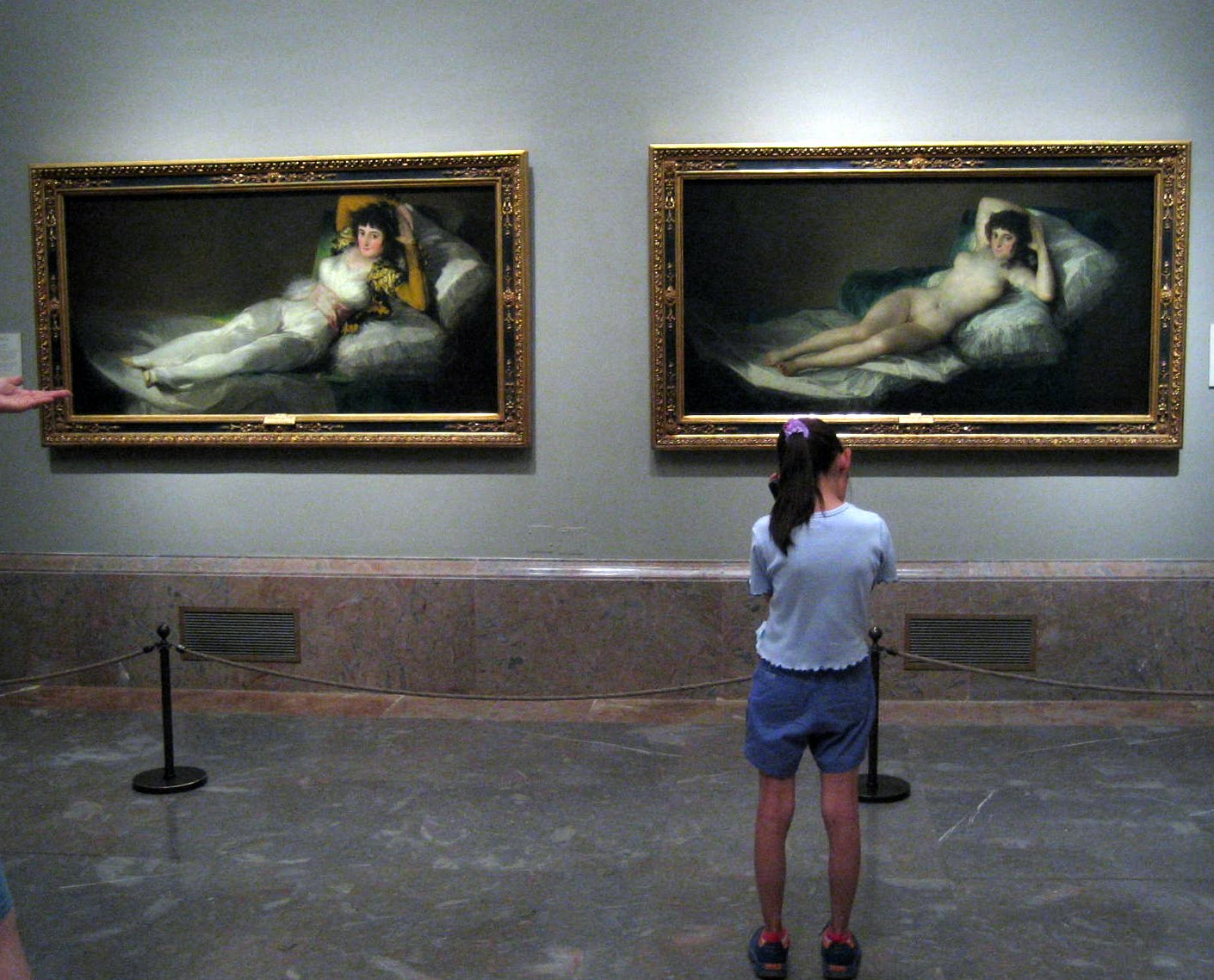
View of the two paintings side by side

La maja desnuda has always hung alongside, above, or before its companion. They were twice in the collection of the Royal Academy of Fine Arts of San Fernando, also in Madrid, being "sequestered" by the Inquisition between 1814 and 1836 before being returned. They have been in the Prado since 1901.

It is not known if the two works were intended to be hung together. One early account gives the Clothed Maja placed in front of the current work; the pull of a cord revealed the nude version. Today they are hung side by side, although others have suggested that they were intended to be spaced apart, and seen in succession.

== Identity of the model ==
It has been conjectured that the woman depicted was Prime Minister Godoy's young mistress Pepita Tudó, who became ultimately his second wife. It has also been suggested that the woman was María del Pilar Teresa Cayetana de Silva y Álvarez de Toledo, 13th Duchess of Alba, with whom Goya is rumored to have been romantically involved and whose portrait he painted twice (in 1795 and 1797). However, many scholars have rejected this possibility, including Australian art critic Robert Hughes in his 2003 biography Goya. Many agree that Pepita Tudó is a more likely candidate. Others believe that the woman is a composite of several different models.

The word maja is the feminine form of majo, a low-class Spaniard of the 18th and 19th century.

== Influence ==
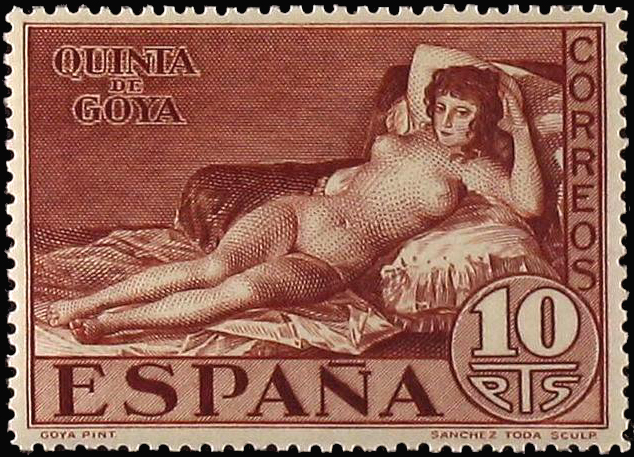
1930 Spanish stamp

The work has inspired other artists. Jeffrey Meyers, in his book Impressionist Quartet: The Intimate Genius of Manet and Morisot, Degas and Cassatt, opines that Manet's Olympia "boldly alluded to another masterpiece, Goya's Naked Maja."

Two sets of stamps depicting La maja desnuda in commemoration of Goya's work were privately produced in 1930 and later approved by the Spanish Postal Authority.

The novel The Naked Maja (by Samuel Edwards, 1959) is based on Goya's affairs with the duchess. Later that same year, an Italian-French-American co-production film based on this novel (sharing the same name) was made by S.G.C., Titanus Films, and United Artists.

The painting figures into the plot of film Toto in Madrid, an Italian comedy film from 1959, directed by Steno, written by Vittorio Metz, starring Totò and Louis de Funès.

In the 1982 comedy film The Toy, U.S. Bates has a portrait of his young wife posed in imitation of La maja vestida. A hidden switch on Bates' desk causes the figure's clothes to slide away, making it now resemble La maja desnuda.

In the 2013 thriller film Trance, La maja desnuda is discussed by the male and female leads (Simon and Elizabeth), with Simon telling Elizabeth that he prefers the old aesthetic of paintings before La maja desnuda that did not depict women's pubic hair. Elizabeth then takes this as a cue to remove her own pubic hair.

== See also ==
- List of works by Francisco Goya
- 100 Great Paintings, 1980 BBC series

== Sources ==
- Connell, Evan S. Francisco Goya: A Life. New York: Counterpoint, 2004. ISBN 1-58243-307-0
- Hughes, Robert. Goya. New York: Alfred A. Knopf, 2004. ISBN 0-394-58028-1
- Portús, Javier. Nudes and Knights: A Context for Venus, in Carr, Dawson W. Velázquez. Ed. Dawson W. Carr; also Xavier Bray, Javier Portús and others. National Gallery London, 2006. ISBN 1-85709-303-8
- Tomlinson, Janis A. Goya in the Twilight of Enlightenment. Yale University Press, 1992. ISBN 0-300-05462-9
- Updike, John (3 November 2003). "An Obstinate Survivor". The New Yorker.
