= Prince of the Peace (title) =

Honorary title of Manuel Godoy

Principality of the Peace
- Creation date: 1795
- Created by: Charles IV
- Peerage: Peerage of Spain
- First holder: Manuel Godoy y Álvarez de Faria Rios, Prince of the Peace
- Extinction date: 1808

Prince of the Peace (Spanish: Príncipe de la Paz) was a life title in the Peerage of Spain, granted in 1795 by Charles IV to Manuel Godoy, his favourite and Secretary of State. The title is a reference to the Peace of Basel which Godoy successfully managed, putting an end to the War of the Pyrenees in July 1795.

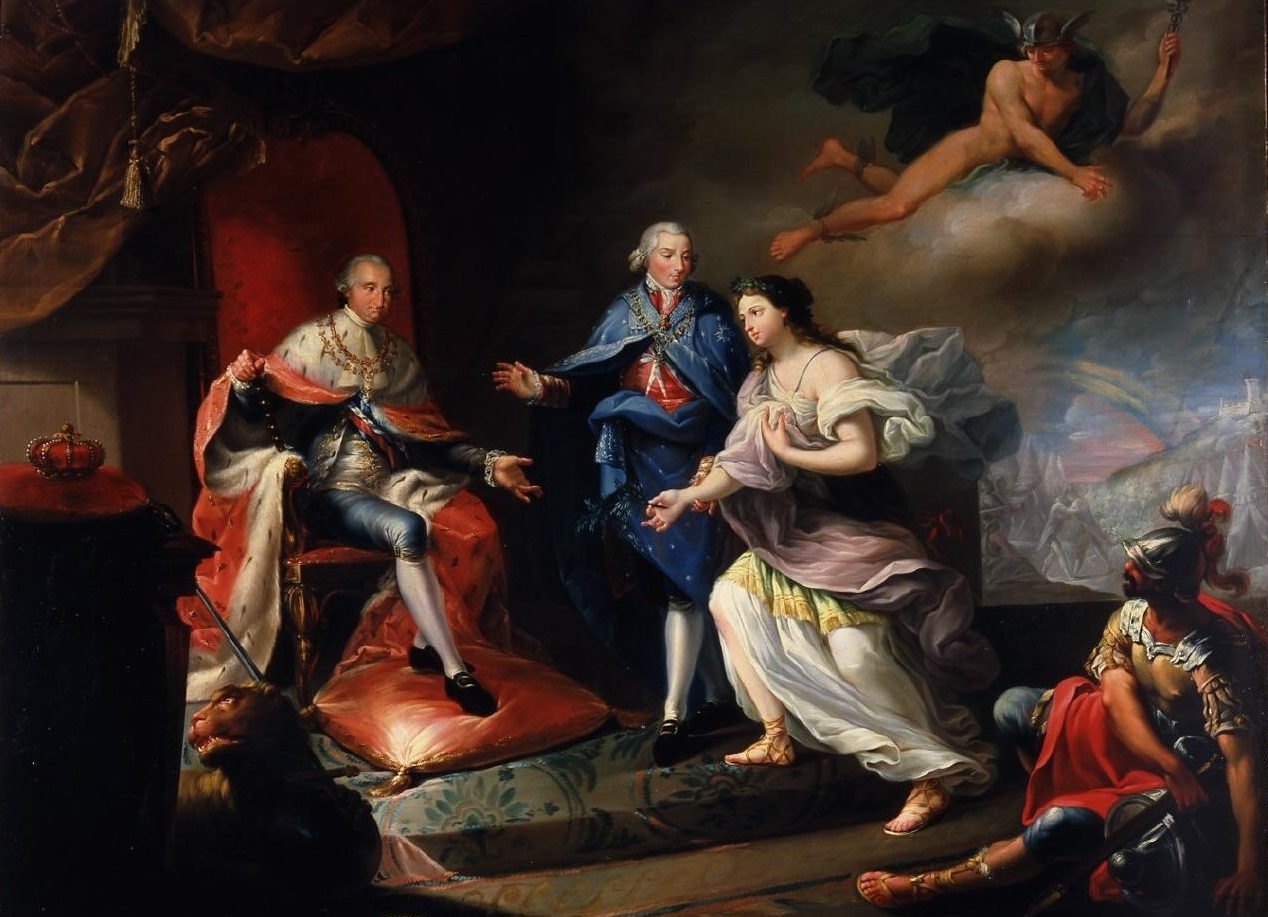
Charles IV (left) is presented with the peace on behalf of Godoy (right), 1796

== History ==
Despite being originally created by Charles IV as hereditary, his son Ferdinand VII quickly revoked all of Godoy's titles as soon as he became king in 1808. The general's unpopularity amongst the population as well as Spanish customs not allowing any prince titles (a dignity exclusively reserved for the heir to the throne) were some of the reasons that fuelled this. Years later, Isabella II rehabilitated all of his titles by Royal Decree of 31 May 1847, with the exception of Prince of the Peace, considering it alien to Spanish peerage tradition.

As a general rule, the law in Spanish nobility states that the title of "prince" is reserved for the Prince of Asturias, heir to the throne of Spain. Throughout history, there have only been two exceptions, namely Prince of the Peace and Prince of Vergara.

Other exceptions are found in the princely titles granted by the monarchs of Spain in their capacity as sovereigns of other European territories: Netherlands, Milan, Naples, Sicily, etc. Some of these titles were rehabilitated in Spain with the denomination of dukedoms or marquessates.

== Princes of the Peace (1795) ==
- Manuel Godoy y Álvarez de Faria, Prince of the Peace (1767–1851, revoked in 1808)

== See also ==
- Prince of Vergara
- Duke of Alcudia
- Duke of Sueca
