= Manuel Godoy =

First Secretary of State of Spain

His Highness The Most Excellent and Most Serene The Prince of the Peace GE OM
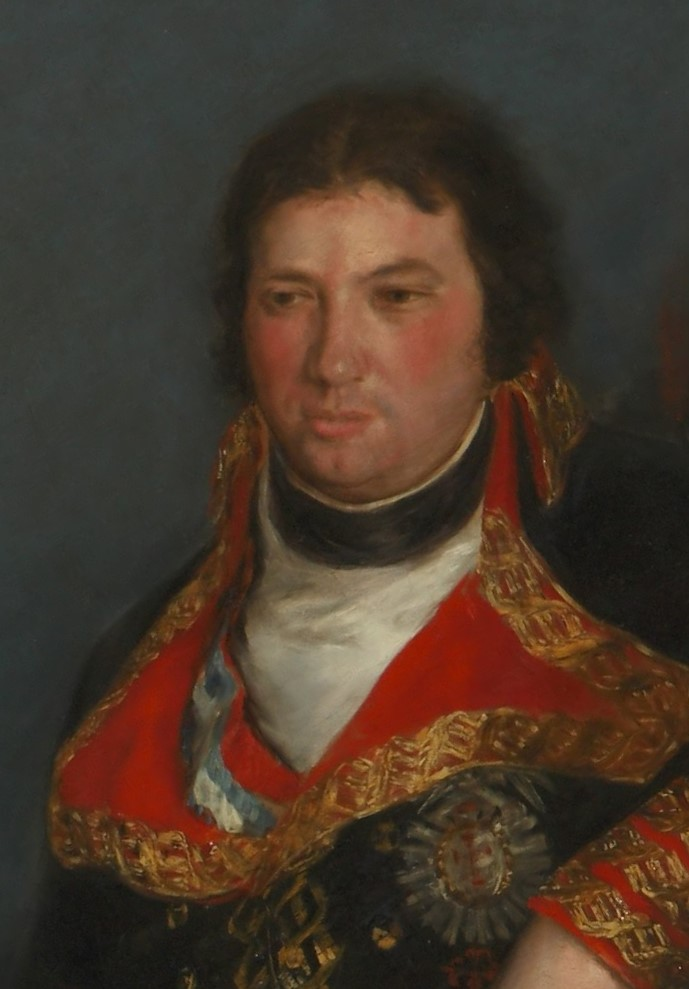
- Goya: Detail of the Portrait of Manuel Godoy, 1801

First Secretary of State
- In office 15 November 1792 – 28 March 1798
- Monarch: Charles IV
- Preceded by: Pedro Pablo Abarca de Bolea
- Succeeded by: Francisco Saavedra de Sangronis

Personal details
- Born: 12 May 1767 Badajoz, Spain
- Died: 4 October 1851 (aged 84) Paris, France
- Resting place: Père Lachaise Cemetery
- Spouses: Doña María Teresa Carolina de Borbón y Vallabriga (m. 1797; div. 1808) Josefa de Tudó (m. 1829)
- Children: Carlota de Godoy, 2nd Duchess of Sueca; Manuel de Godoy y Tudó; Luis de Godoy y Tudó

Manuel de Godoy y Álvarez de Faria Ríos, 1st Prince of the Peace (12 May 1767 – 4 October 1851) was First Secretary of State of the Kingdom of Spain from 1792 to 1797 and from 1801 to 1808. He was one of the central Spanish political figures during the rise of Napoleon and his invasion of Spain. Godoy came to power at a young age as the favourite of King Charles IV and Queen Maria Luisa, with whom he had a sexual relationship. He has been partly blamed for the Anglo-Spanish War of 1796–1808 that weakened the Spanish Empire. Godoy's unmatched power ended in 1808 with the Tumult of Aranjuez, which forced him into long exile. He died in Paris in 1851.

== Birth and family ==
Godoy was born in Badajoz as the youngest child of José de Godoy Cáceres Ovando y Ríos, regidor of Badajoz for the "estado noble", and Antonia Álvarez de Faria, of noble Portuguese extraction. Much is known about his family and the documented nobility of his four grandparents, mainly due to the reports presented by his brothers Luis and Diego for their respective memberships to the Order of Santiago, and Order of Calatrava, as well as his mother's brothers, José and Juan Manuel Álvarez de Faria for the Order of Santiago. The Godoy family of Badajoz came originally from Galicia, claiming descent from Pedro Muñiz de Godoy, master of the orders of Santiago and Calatrava, Adelantado-Mayor and Capitán-General of the border with Portugal, who distinguished himself during the reign of Henry II of Castile, and died in 1385 at the Battle of Valverde.

His siblings were:

- José (Badajoz), canon of Badajoz and of Mojacar.
- Luis, field-marshal and captain-general of Extremadura, knight of the Order of Santiago (1787). Married (1792) Juana de Armendáriz, 7th Vicountess of La Armería, daughter of Juan Esteban de Armendáriz, 2nd Marquis of Castelfuerte, and Donata de Samaniego, 6th Vicountess of La Armería.
- Diego, 1st Duke of Almodóvar del Campo, knight of the Order of Calatrava (1794), first married Pascuala Paes, with no issue, and secondly Josefa Joaquina de Olazábal y Murguía, 25th Noble Dame of the Royal Order of Queen María Luisa.
- María Antonia, 21st Noble Dame of the Royal Order of Queen María Luisa, married (1790) to Miguel de la Grúa Talamanca, 1st Marquis of Branciforte, Viceroy of New Spain, son of Vincenzo La Grua Talamanca, 5th Prince of Carini, Duke of Villanova, and Lucrezia Branciforte di Butera.
- Ramona de las Mercedes, 87th Noble Dame of the Royal Order of Queen María Luisa, married to Manuel José Cándido de Moreno Cidoncha, 1st Count of Fuente Blanca.

== Early life and royal favourite ==
In 1784, at the age of 17, Godoy moved to Madrid where he entered the Guardia de Corps (guards of the Royal Family). When he went to court in Madrid, his singing and guitar playing set him apart (although he denied this in his Memoirs) and led him to royal favour, where by his intelligence and audacity (and according to some, the favors of María Luisa) he obtained Charles, Prince of Asturias' trust. In 1788 he met the heir to the Spanish throne, who later that year acceded as King Charles IV.

Godoy quickly became a favourite of Charles IV and of his wife, Queen Maria Luisa. On 30 December 1788 he was given the office of Cadete supernumerario in the royal palace and in May 1789 he was promoted to the rank of colonel. In November 1789 he was named a knight of the Order of Santiago and in August 1790 he advanced to the rank of commander in the same order. In 1791 he was Adjutant-General (Ajudante-General) of the Bodyguard, in February he was named Field-Marshal (Mariscal de Campo), in March Gentleman of the Chamber (Gentilhombre de la Cámara), and in July Lieutenant-General (Teniente-General) and a Knight Grand Cross of the Order of Charles III in 1791.

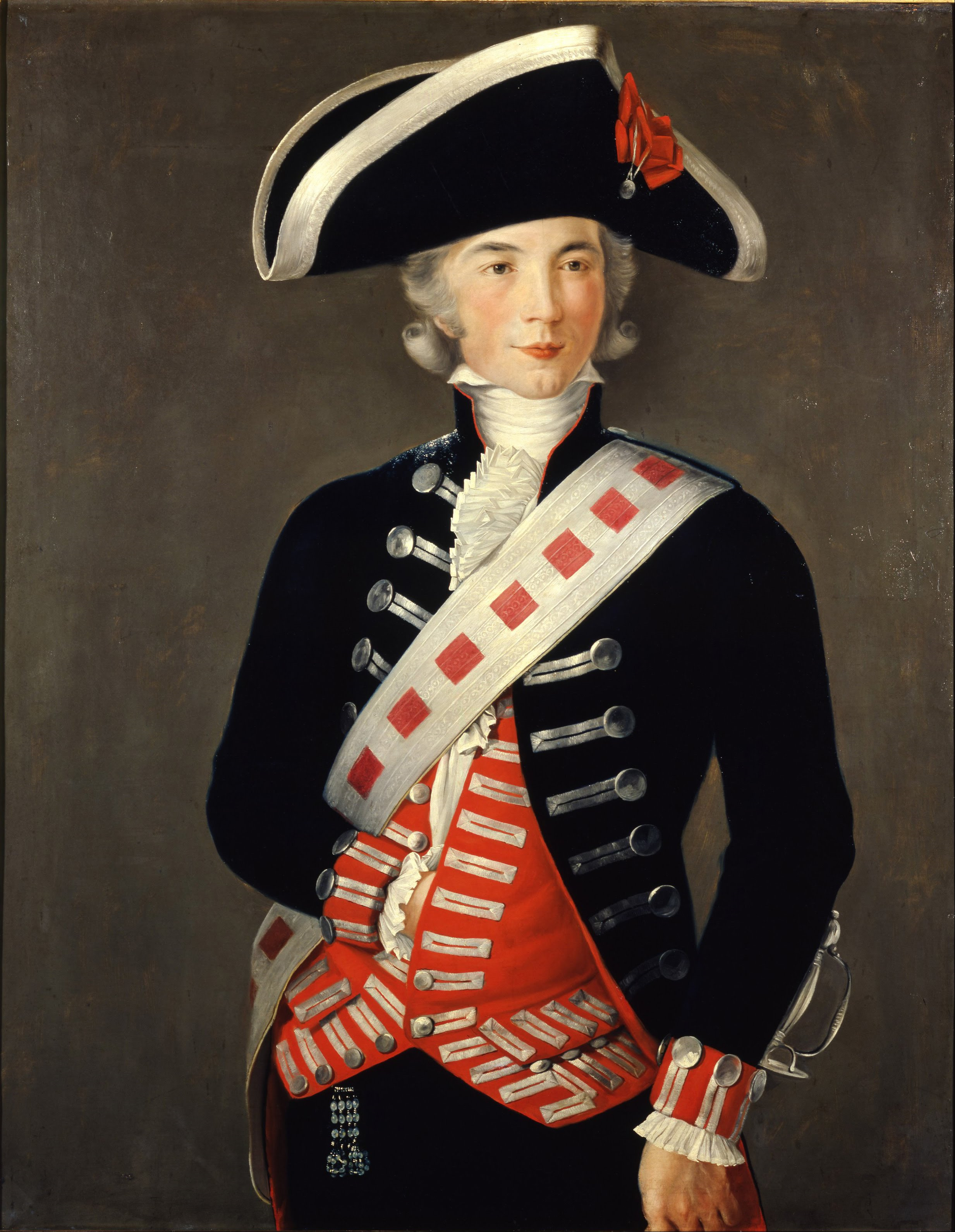
Godoy in 1788 as a Guardia de Corps, by Francisco Folch de Cardona

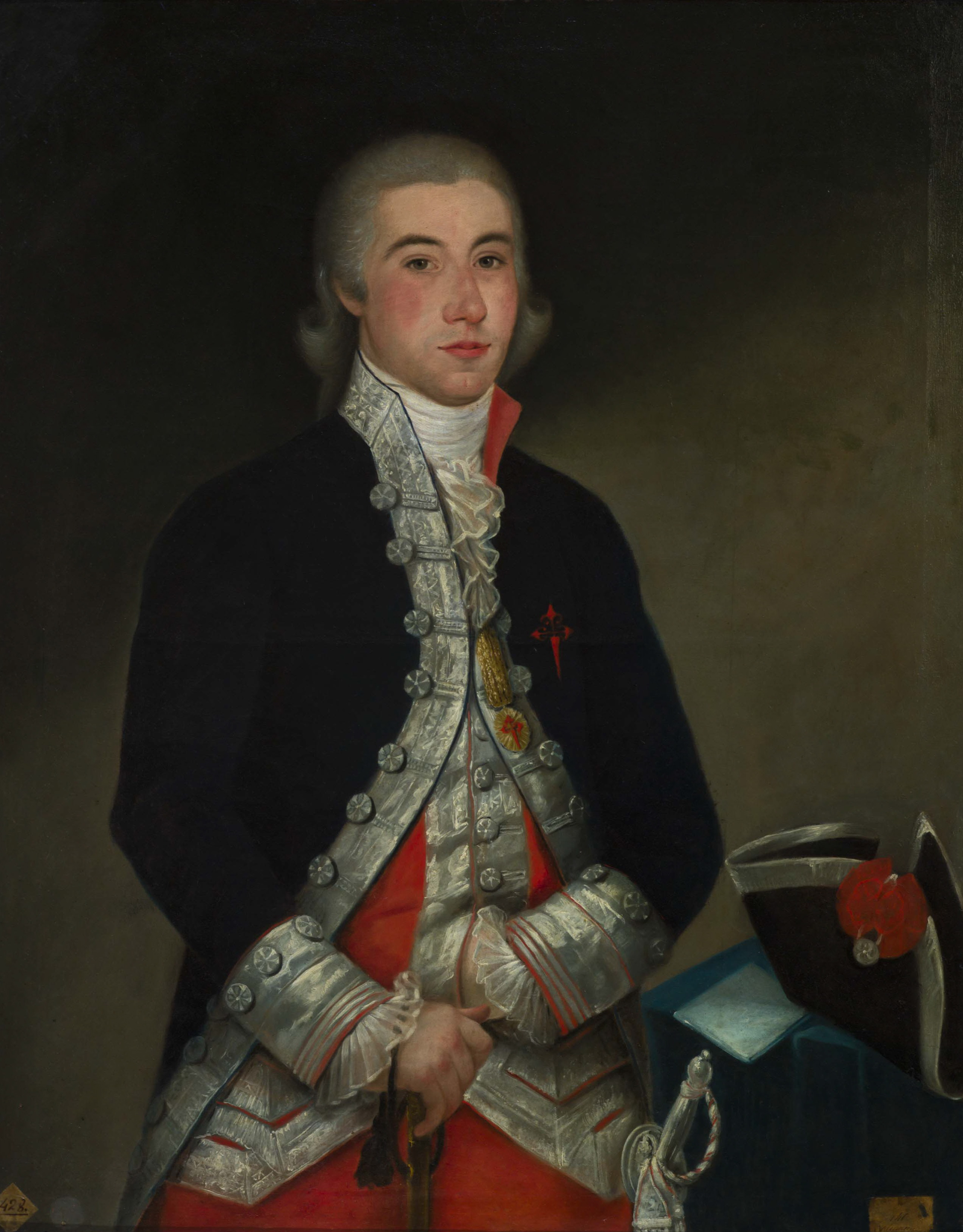
Godoy wearing the cross of the Order of Santiago (c. 1790, anonymous)

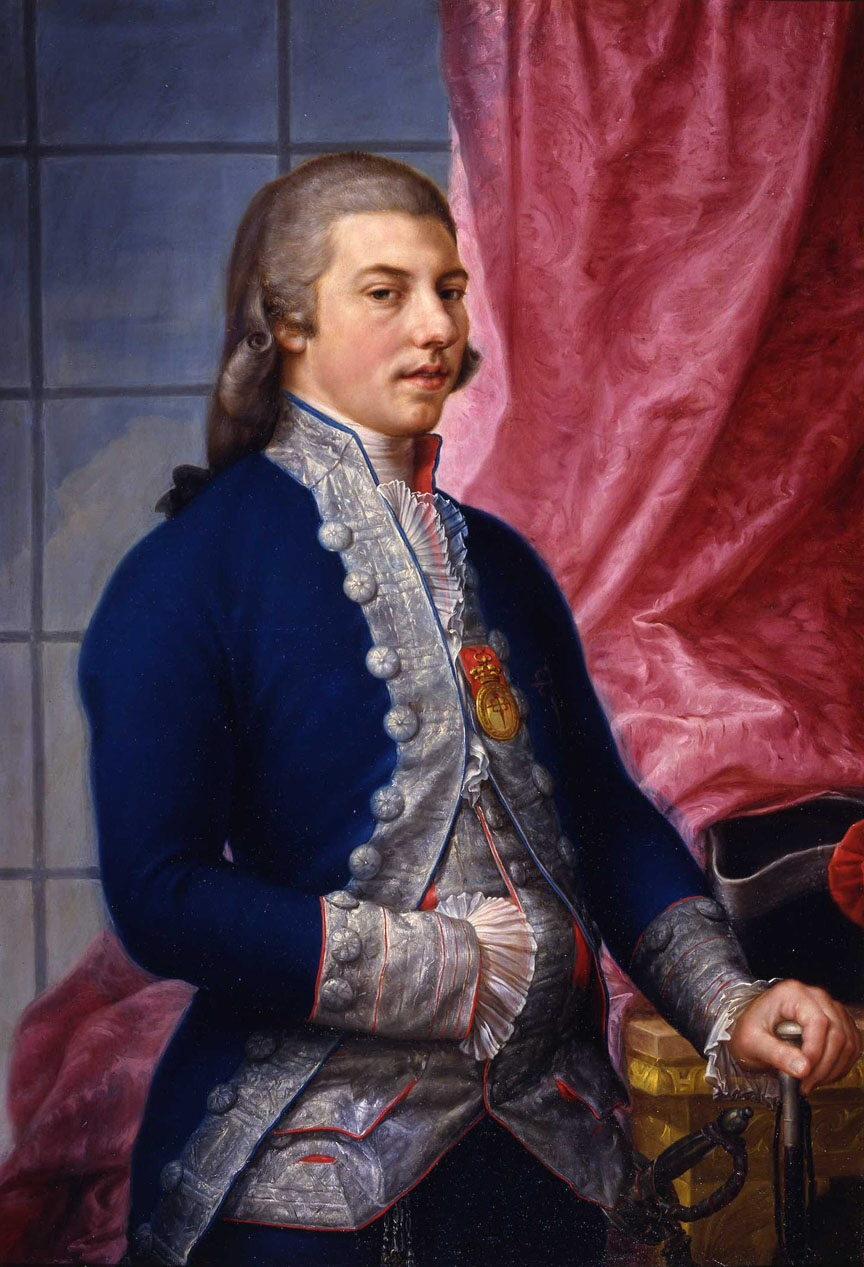
Godoy by Francisco Bayeu (1790)

== Prime Minister of Spain ==
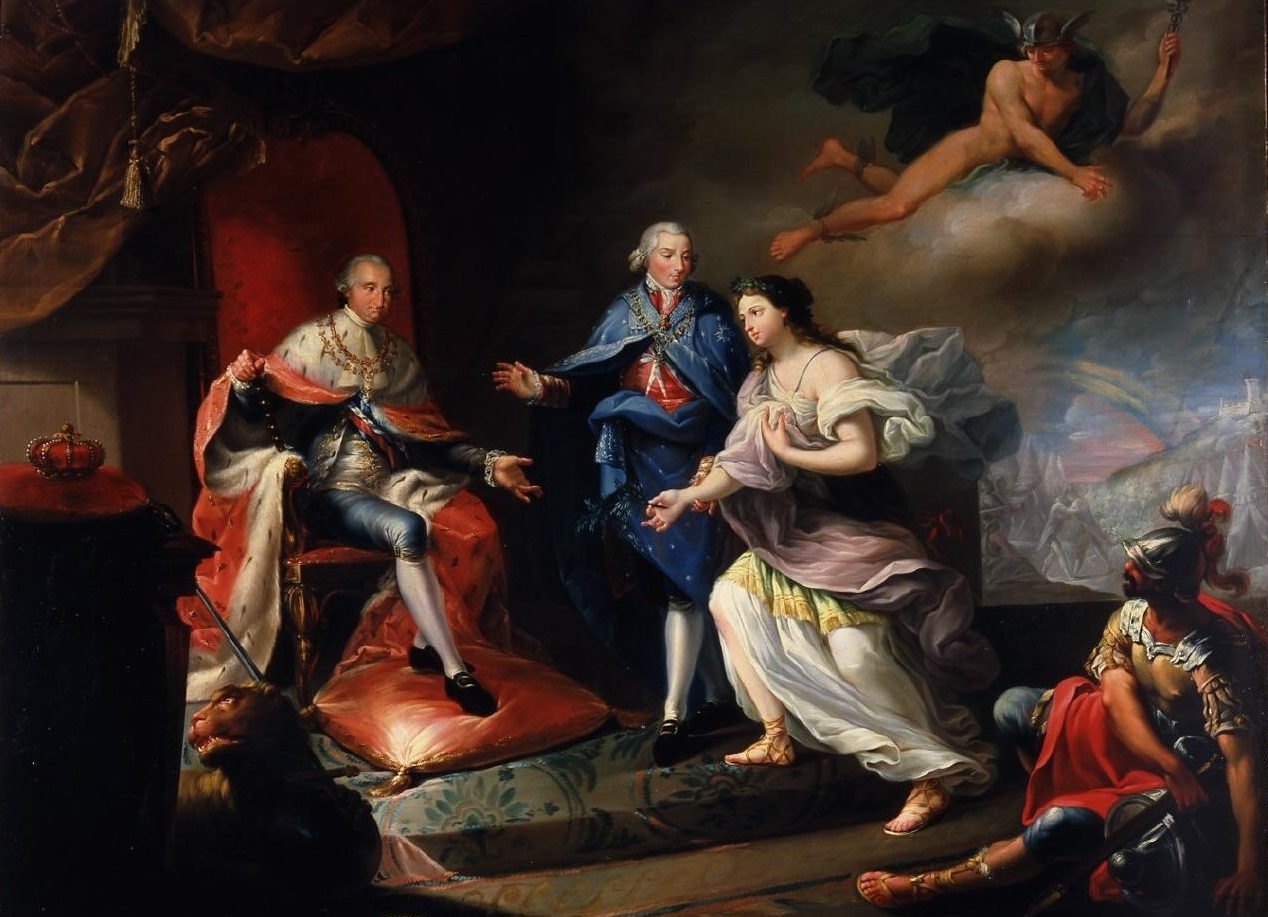
Godoy presenting Charles IV with peace (1796) by Pau Montaña

Godoy's frequent promotions were signs of his increasing influence over the King and Queen. In 1791 Prime Minister Floridablanca, accused Godoy of an adulterous relationship with the Queen. In January 1792 Floridablanca fell from office on account of Spain's relationship with the emerging French Republic. His successor Pedro Pablo Abarca de Bolea, 10th Count of Aranda fell from office the following November, and Queen Maria Luisa arranged for Godoy to be prime minister. Godoy's appointment seems to have been accomplished with the full acceptance of King Charles IV who, lacking talent for governing, was happy to employ a competent and trustworthy stand-in.

In 1792 Godoy was made Duke of la Alcudia with grandeeship and a Knight of the Order of the Golden Fleece the following year. Another year later, he was made Captain General and Duke of Sueca, Marquis of Alvarez, and Lord of Soto de Roma. He was also made the 15th Minister for Foreign Affairs of Spain on 15 November 1792.

== Wars ==
Godoy continued Spain's neutral policy towards the French Republic. In 1793 he failed to save King Louis XVI from the guillotine. Spain's protest against Louis' execution and its joining the alliance against the French Republic unleashed the War of the Pyrenees. The French armies managed to advance into the Basque districts in Spain by the west, and by the east (Catalonia).

In July 1795, Godoy negotiated the Peace of Basel with France, by which Spain's frontier was restored, but its portion of the island of Hispaniola was ceded to the French. Although Godoy was widely criticized for the treaty, he received after its conclusion the title of "Prince of the Peace" (Príncipe de la Paz) and the grandeeship of Spain. In August 1796 Godoy negotiated and signed the Second Treaty of San Ildefonso with France, which required that Spain declare war on Great Britain. This placed its ally Portugal in a difficult position, as Portugal was allied to Great Britain.

== Honours ==
In 1797, Godoy had Charles IV grant the titles of 1st Condesa de Castillo Fiel with a coat of arms of de Tudó and 1st Vizcondesa de Rocafuerte (Letters of 14 July 1807) to Godoy's mistress, Josefa (Pepita) de Tudó, born in Cádiz on 19 May 1779, Dame of Her Royal Majesty the Queen and 385th Noble Dame of the Royal Order of Queen María Luisa. She was the daughter of Antonio de Tudó y Alemany, Brigadier of the Royal Spanish Armies, Governor of the Royal Buen Retiro Palace, and his wife Catalina Cathalán y Luecia. Some sources mention a secret marriage between Godoy and Pepita, supposedly celebrated 22 June 1797 in the Prado. Pepita had lived in Godoy's household for several years with her mother and two sisters.

In 1797 Queen Maria Luisa arranged a marriage for Godoy, which she hoped would draw him from his mistress and at the same time obscure her own relationship with Godoy. Doña María Teresa Carolina de Borbón, born at Velada on 6 March 1779 (some say 26 January 1780), Charles IV's cousin and the daughter of his exiled and disgraced uncle Luis de Borbón y Farnesio, 13th Count of Chinchón, was chosen to be Godoy's wife. Although she had not met Godoy, Maria Teresa acquiesced in the marriage, which ensured the restoration of her family's fortunes. They married on 11 September or 2 October in the Escorial, Madrid. Godoy received a financial settlement as part of the marriage agreement, but his mistress continued to live in the same house as his wife.

Godoy was removed from the office of prime minister in 1797 and elevated to the position of Captain-General (Capitán-General). His position had been compromised by ongoing relationship struggles both with the French Republic and with Queen Maria Luisa, and he ceased to be Minister for Foreign Affairs on 30 March 1798. In October 1800 Godoy's wife Maria Teresa, previously made 1st Marquesa de Boadilla del Monte (Letter of 4 August 1799), bore a daughter Carlota Luisa Manuela, an only daughter who later inherited her mother's titles and/or representations and all of her father's Spanish and Portuguese titles and/or representations. She was baptised at the Escorial with Charles IV and Maria Luisa standing as godparents. The same day, along with her daughter and sister, she was made the 96th Noble Dame of the Royal Order of Queen María Luisa, on 10 October 1800.

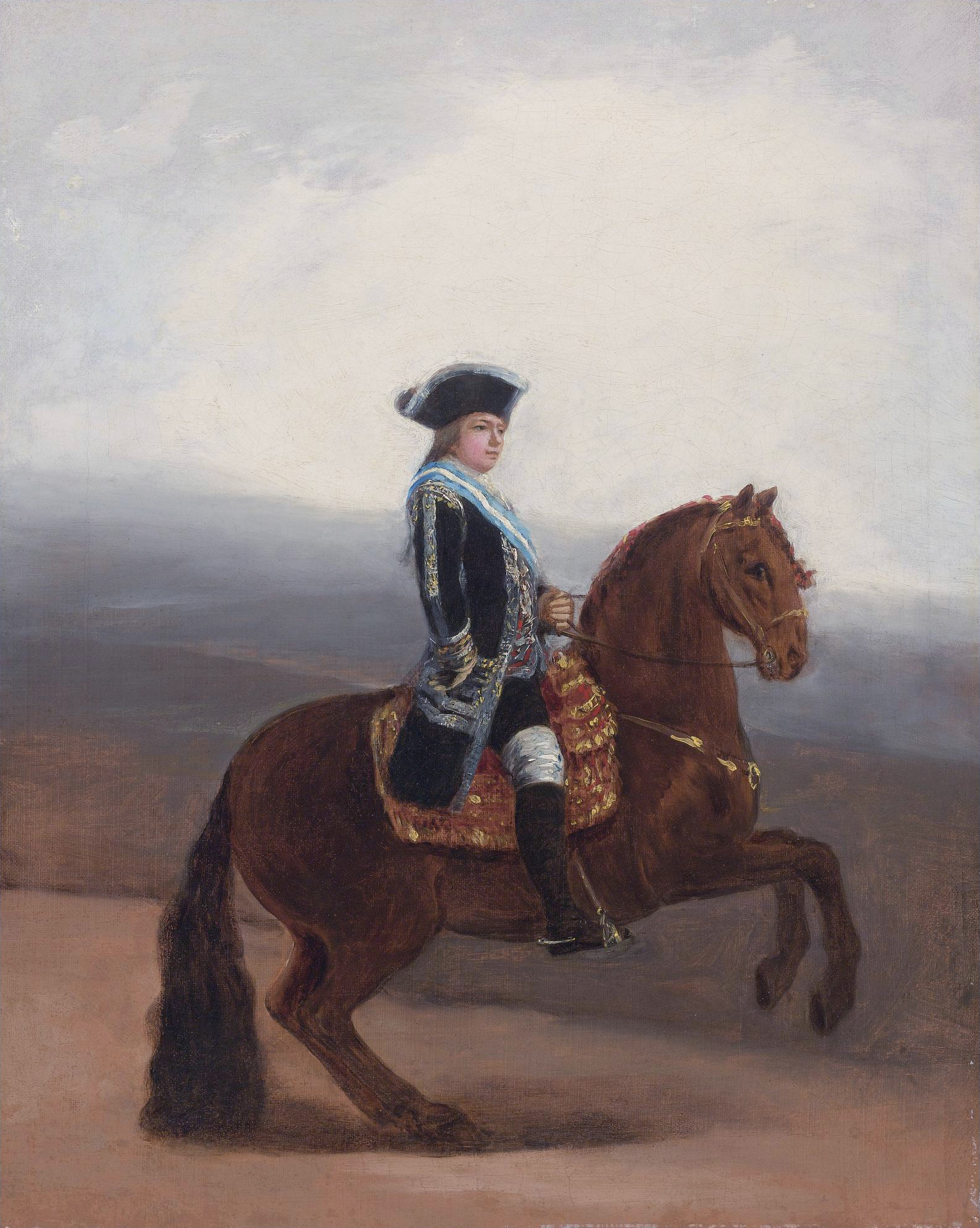
Equestrian portrait of Godoy by Francisco de Goya, (1794)

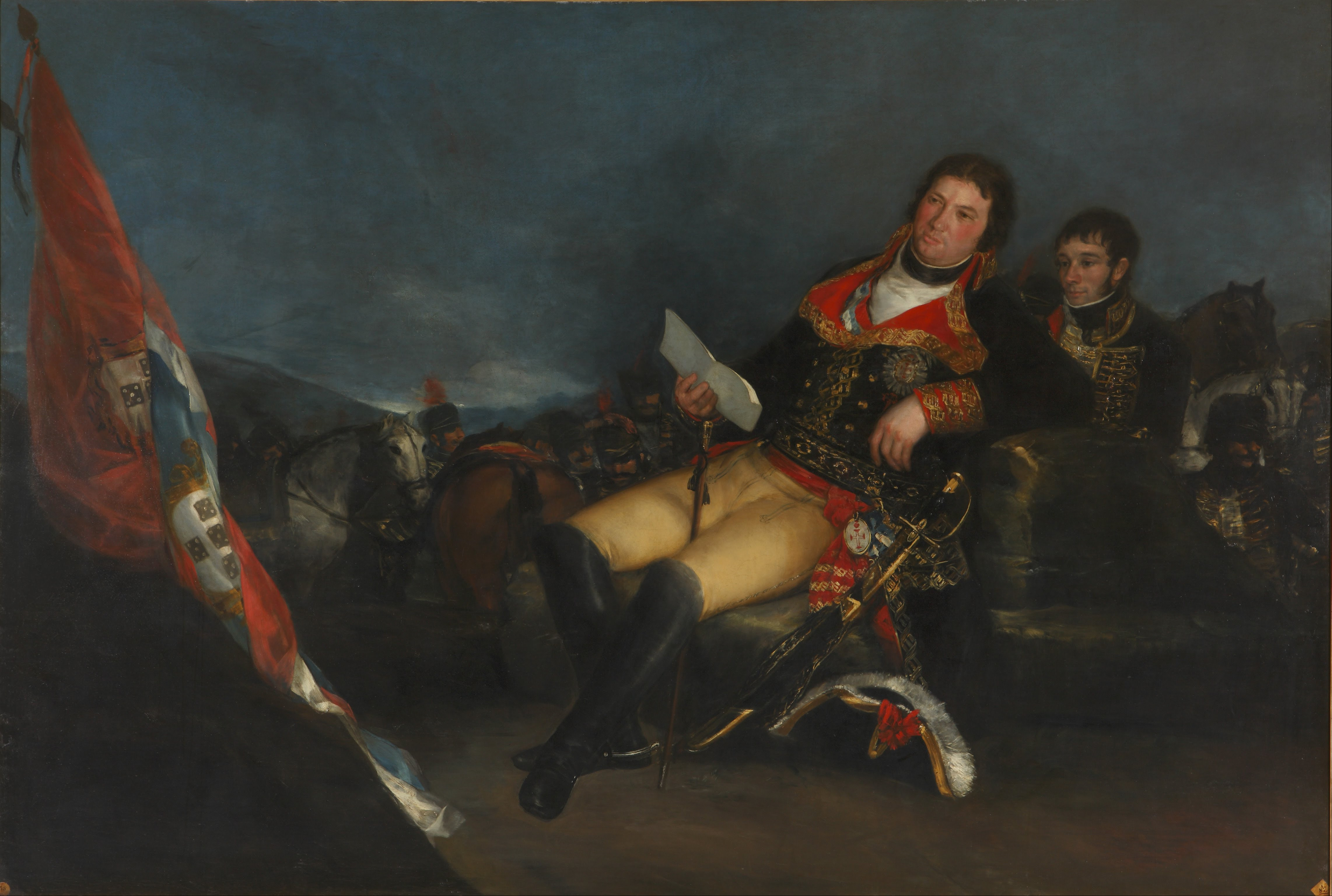
Godoy by Francisco de Goya (1801)

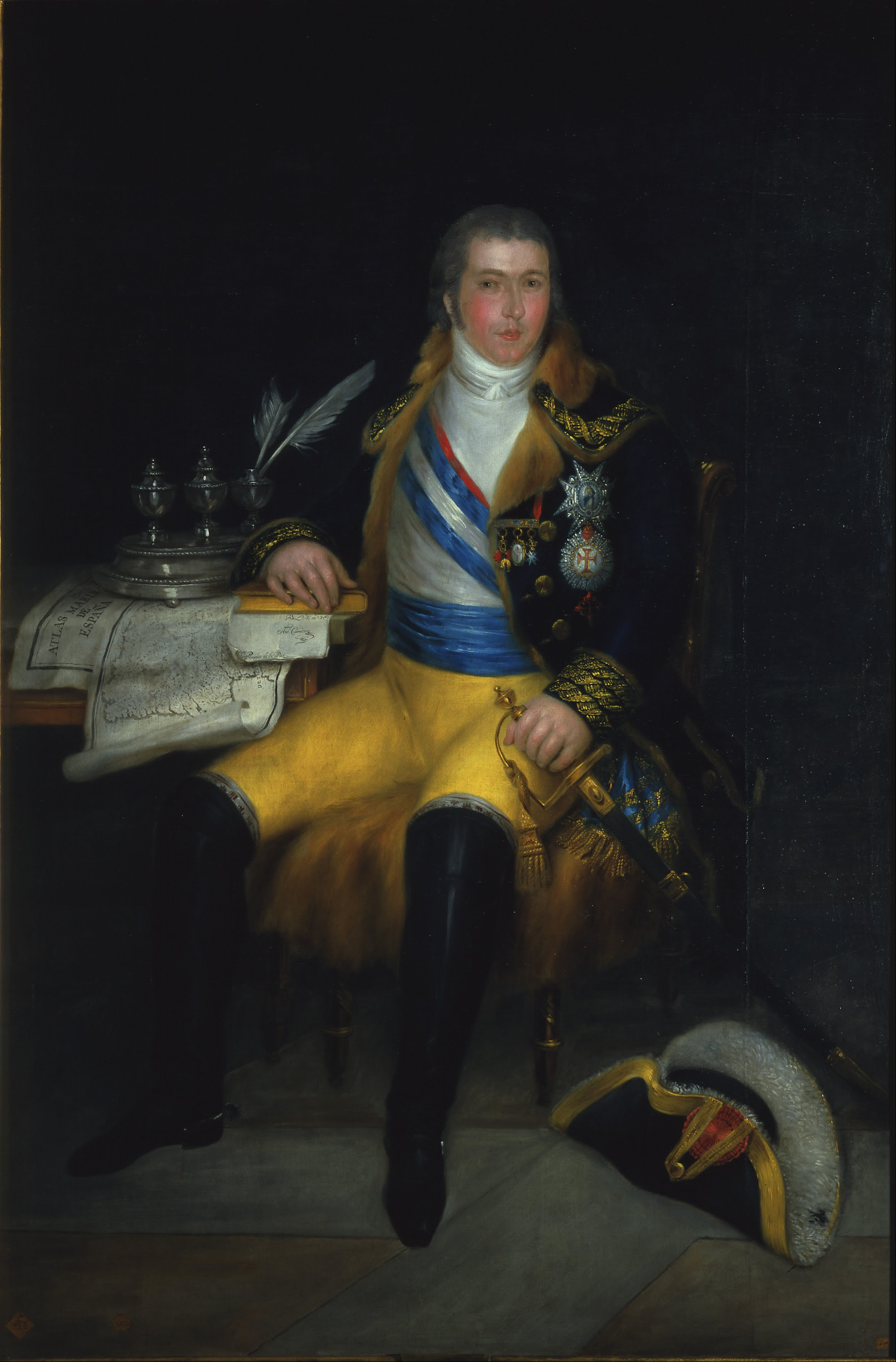
Godoy by Antonio Carnicero (1807)

== Return to power (1801–1808) ==
Godoy's cousin, Pedro Cevallos became prime minister on 13 December 1799, allowing Godoy to assume de facto control of Spain as generalissimo of her armed forces. With support from France, he declared war on Portugal. Using his post of Captain-General, he led the army in the 1801 invasion of Portugal in the successful campaign that the Spanish authors call War of the Oranges (Guerra de las Naranjas or Guerra das Laranjas). His army left Badajoz on 20 May. A writ of rendition he made to Elvas was energetically repealed by the Governor, Dom Francisco José Xavier de Noronha e Meneses, Marques de Marialva Condes de Cantanhede, who maintained the fortified place until the end of the campaign. Even without a siege, Olivença and Juromenha surrendered without resistance, as did Arronches, Portalegre, Castelo de Vide, Barbacena and Ouguela. Campo Maior capitulated, after a siege of seventeen days, on the night of 6 June, when the Peace of Badajoz (6 June 1801) had already been signed. Portugal lost Olivença.

In 1802 he negotiated the Treaty of Amiens with Great Britain; Spain ceded the island of Trinidad to Britain but recovered Menorca. The same year. Napoleon wrote to King Charles IV telling him that Godoy was the de facto King of Spain and that he was also Maria Luisa's lover. The letter was intercepted by Godoy's staff, but he still allowed the letter to be delivered.

Elevated to the position of Generalissimo of the Army of Land and Sea of Spain (1804), he was granted a private bodyguard. Meanwhile, his wife became heiress to her brother's House with his entry to the clergy, and thus became 15th Condesa de Chinchón and Grandee of Spain First Class with a Coat of Arms of Bourbon in 1803 (Letter of 7 March 1804) and 1st Duquesa de Sueca and Grandee of Spain First Class (Letter of 7 March 1804).

In 1804 Godoy was elected a member of the American Philosophical Society in Philadelphia, Pennsylvania.

In 1804 a British squadron engaged and defeated a Spanish force sailing from Peru to Spain, causing Godoy to again declare war on Britain. On 21 October 1805, the French and Spanish fleets suffered a humiliating defeat at the Battle of Trafalgar, ending Spain's last bid to be a world power.

In 1805 his mistress bore him a son, Manuel, and in 1807 another son, Luis. Some genealogies hold that they had an only son, who inherited his mother's titles/representations and his father's Italian title, which could only be acquired through the male line, named Manuel Luis.

Between 1804 and 1806, Godoy proposed to address many of the problems of the Spanish Empire by turning it into a union of kingdoms, ruled by members of the royal family, but it was discarded.

=== 1807: Treaty of Fontainebleau ===
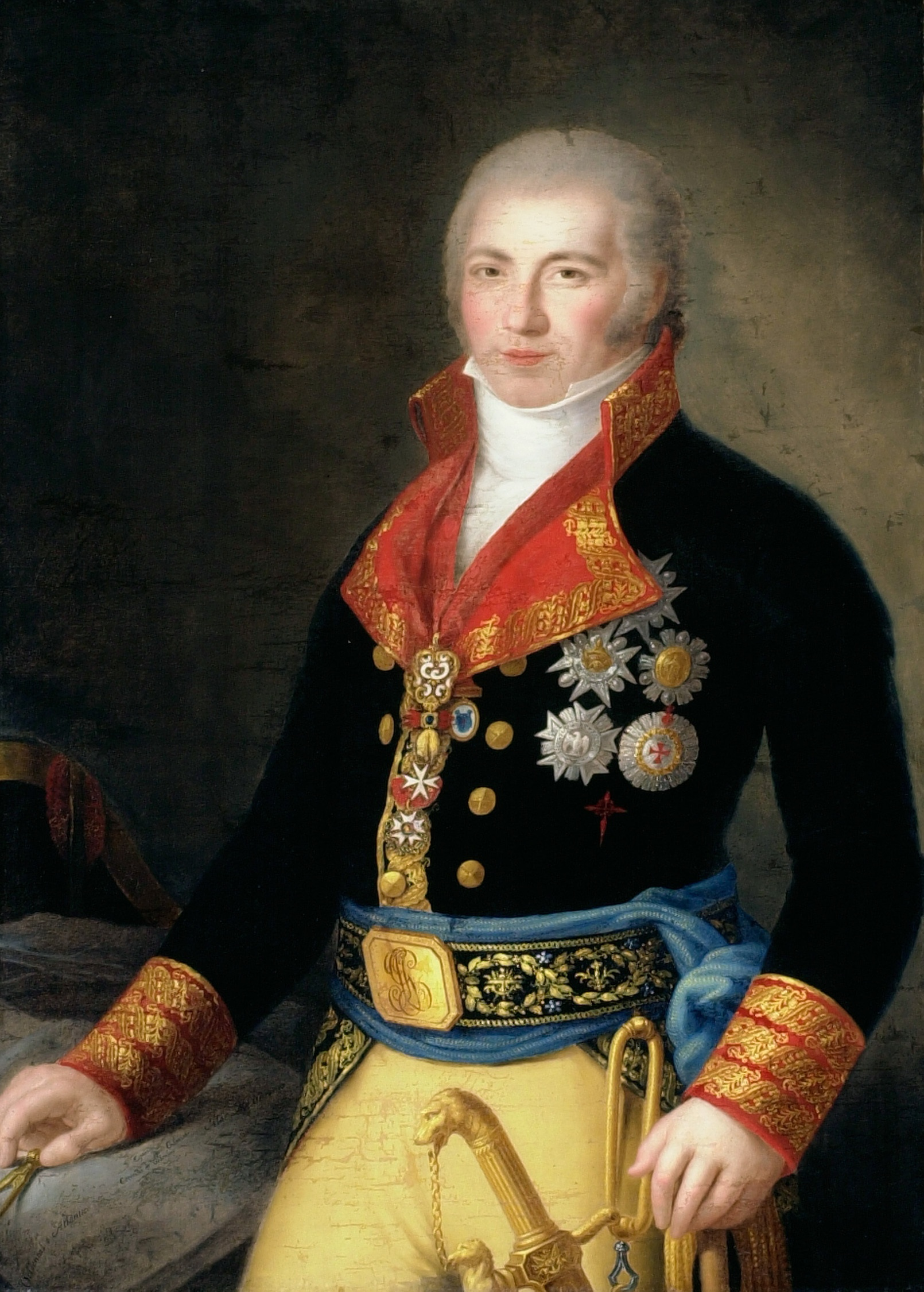
Portrait of Godoy, by Agustín Esteve, 19th century

In 1807 he received the title of Most Serene Highness. Later that year, Godoy negotiated the Treaty of Fontainebleau with Napoleon, which partitioned the Kingdom of Portugal. Godoy was awarded the "Principality of the Algarves", with Alentejo and Algarve, under the protectorate of the Spanish king. This treaty preceded the first French invasion of Portugal. Article 2 of the treaty promised the southern half of Portugal to Godoy as "Prince of the Algarves"; this would have ensured Godoy's future. That future was already uncertain in Spain, because he was hated by the heir to the throne, the future Ferdinand VII.

But the promises of the Treaty of Fontainebleau were not fulfilled, as Napoleon had already begun to consider making Joseph Bonaparte king of Spain. In December, Godoy allowed French troops in Spain as allies to assist in the partition of Portugal. The revolt against the French spread through Spain and Portugal. In March 1808, Godoy, Charles IV, Maria Luisa, and the rest of the court abandoned the Escorial and fled to Aranjuez with the intention of escaping to New Spain.

Supporters of Ferdinand (who had for some time been considering a coup d'état against his father) spread the story that Godoy had sold Spain to Napoleon. On 18 March a popular uprising known as the Tumult of Aranjuez took place. A mob stormed Godoy's residence, where at first they only found his mistress Pepita. Two days later, Godoy was found; Charles had Godoy's property confiscated and then imprisoned him in the Castle of Villaviciosa de Odón, a property owned by his wife Maria Teresa. To end the uprising and to save Godoy's life, Charles IV abdicated in favour of his son Ferdinand VII.

Inspired by elements from outside its ranks, the royal guard had sought to impose its views upon the body politic by 'pronouncing' against the regime. Challenged by this call of arms, Godoy and his royal patrons found that they had few defenders. The officer corps as a whole was disgruntled by the failure of reforms to make any difference in its situation, and his orders to resist the French were already widely disobeyed; much of the upper nobility and the Church was hostile; reformist circles had long since lost all faith in Godoy's political credentials; and the common people were in a state of open revolt. As for Ferdinand, he was seen as a saviour, the reception that he received when he rode into Madrid on 24 March.

The new king was popular, but his security was not certain. Joachim Murat had occupied the city only the day before, and, despite increasingly abject attempts to win France's favour, refused to recognize Ferdinand. Charles IV protested his abdication and appealed to Napoleon for assistance. With the two rivals openly craving his mediation, the Emperor was placed in an ideal position to control events. He summoned Charles, María Luisa, and Ferdinand to meet him for a conference at Bayonne (Godoy was rescued from captivity and transported to France). With all the contestants united in his presence, Napoleon demanded that the rival kings renounce the throne and hand it to him. Charles assented, and on 5 May Ferdinand's defiance was overcome and the throne was formally signed over to Napoleon in exchange for generous pensions for the royal family and guarantees of territorial and religious integrity for Spain. With the whole of the Peninsula subjugated, Napoleon appeared to have achieved his every objective. However, even as the Bourbons departed into exile - Charles, María Luisa and Godoy to Italy, and Ferdinand, his brother, Charles, and uncle, Antonio, to Talleyrand's Château de Valençay - the Peninsula remained restive.

== Exile ==
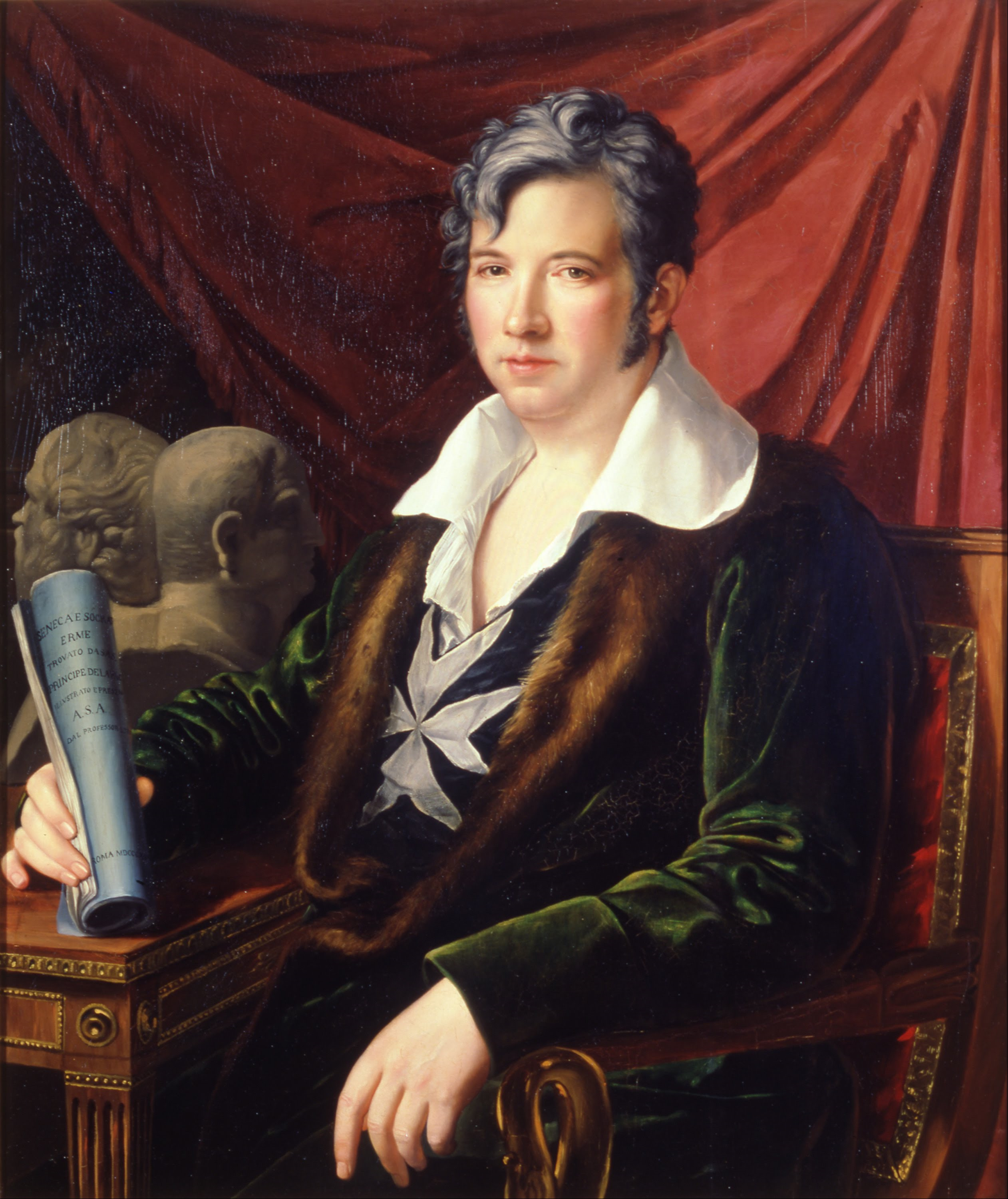
Godoy in exile, by José de Madrazo (1816)

Godoy spent the next few years living in exile with Charles, Maria Luisa, his daughter Carlota Luisa, his mistress Pepita, and their sons (Maria Teresa had divorced him in 1808). They lived for several months at Fontainebleau, then at Compiègne, and then at Aix-en-Provence. In October 1808, they arrived in Marseille, where they spent four years. In July 1812, they moved to Rome, where they lived in the Palazzo Barberini.

In April 1814, Ferdinand VII was restored as King of Spain (he had lived for six years in France). He refused to allow his parents or Godoy to return to Spain and had Pope Pius VII exile Godoy and his mistress to Pesaro. During the Hundred Days, Charles IV and Maria Luisa fled from France to Verona, where they were joined by Godoy and Pepita. Godoy petitioned the Emperor Francis I of Austria for asylum in Vienna, but Ferdinand forbade it.

After Napoleon's final defeat, Charles IV, Maria Luisa and Pepita returned to Rome, but the Pope required Godoy to stay at Pesaro. In September 1815, Charles and Maria Luisa asked the Pope to annul the marriage between Godoy and Maria Teresa. Godoy was allowed to return to Rome, but to preserve appearances, Pepita and her sons moved to Genoa. Ferdinand then bribed the police to expel Pepita and her family from Genoa; and again from Livorno. Finally, she found a home in Pisa.

In March 1818 Godoy's younger son Luis died. In October, Godoy became ill with malaria; he received the last rites, but recovered. At the end of the year, Maria Luisa caught pneumonia; Charles IV was absent in Naples at the time, but Godoy stayed by her bedside until she died, on 2 January 1819. Five days later, Charles IV wrote to Godoy asking him to vacate the Palazzo Barberini in Rome, only weeks before Charles himself died in Naples.

Ferdinand VII continued to forbid Godoy to return to Spain and ensured that he did not receive any state pension. He also did not allow Godoy's daughter Carlota to marry into a sovereign house, but did agree to her marriage in 1821 to Don Camillo Ruspoli, the younger son of a Roman princely family.

On 24 November 1828 Maria Teresa died in Paris. The following year or still in December of that year, Godoy married Pepita. The Pope made him 1st Principe di Paserano, but Godoy went to live in Paris in 1832, where they lived in somewhat straitened circumstances. Louis Philippe I later gave him a pension.

In 1836 and 1839 Godoy published Memórias del Príncipe de la Paz, his memoirs. Charles IV had asked that he not do this until after the death of his son Ferdinand VII (who had died in 1833). Pepita returned to Spain in hopes of reclaiming the family properties. She died in Madrid on 20 September 1869.

In 1844 he was authorized to return to Spain. In 1847 the Spanish government returned to Godoy part of his confiscated property and restored his titles. He died in Paris in 1851. His body was buried first in the Church of Saint-Roch, but the following year was transferred to the Père Lachaise Cemetery, where it rests today.

The painting La maja desnuda by Francisco de Goya, which depicts a fully nude reclining woman, was once in Godoy's personal collection. It is variously claimed to portray Josefa, Countess of Castillo Fiel or Cayetana, Duchess of Alba, who were Godoy's mistresses.

== Offices and titles ==
Besides receiving many decorations, in Spain he carried many titles and offices:

- 1th Marquess of Alcúdia with the previous title of ?th Viscount of Alto Castillo (titles dated 1722) (Royal Cedule of 10 June 1792).
- 1st Duke of la Alcudia and Grandee of Spain First Class with a Coat of Arms of Godoy (Letter of 4 July 1792)
- Prince of the Peace (Letter of 27 September 1795), 1st Duke of Sueca and Grandee of Spain First Class (Letter of 7 March 1804)
- 1st Barón of Mascalbó, in Catalonia, with a Coat of Arms of Godoy (Letter of 23 June 1806) for being the Perpetual Decane Regidor (Rector) of Reus
- Most Serene Highness (1807)
- Señor de los Estados de la Campana de Albalat y la Serena, de Lago de Albufera (Valencia), and of the villages of Huetor de Santillan y Veas
- Señor de los Sotos de Roma y Aldovea
- Perpetual Regidor (Rector) of the Villages of Madrid, Nava del Rey and Reus, and the Cities of Burgos, Segovia, Valencia, Murcia, Ronda, Manresa, Guadalajara, Gerona, Barcelona, Peñíscola, Sanlúcar de Barrameda, Lérida, Toledo, Toro, Zamora, Asunción de Paraguay, Buenos Aires and México;
- Preeminent Veinte y Quatro (Twenty-Four) of Jerez de la Frontera, Sevilla and Jerez de los Caballeros
- Almerante-Mayor (Admiral-Major) of Spain and the Indies
- Captain-General of the Royal Armies
- Captain of the Body Guards
- Hermano Mayor (Greater Brother) and Perpetual Alcalde of the Holy and Royal Old Brotherhood of Toledo, with voice, vote and Presidency;
- President of the Royal Colegial Body of the Hidalgos of the Nobility of Madrid (1804)
- Gentleman of the Chamber of His Catholic Majesty, with exercise
- Counselor of State
- Prime-Minister of King Carlos IV of Spain
- Commander of Valencia del Ventoso, Ribera and Aceuchal in the Order of Santiago
- Knight of the Order of Santiago (1790)
- Knight of the Renowned Order of the Golden Fleece
- Grand Cross of the Order of Charles III
- Bailiff of the Knights of Malta
- 1st Conde de Évora Monte (Village of the Province of Alentejo, former Council of Vimieiro Administrative District of Évora) in Portugal, with Honours of Relative and the Prerogative, unique in that country, of the title being de Juro e Herdade, with a perpetual dispensation from the Mental Law (Letter of Queen Maria I of Portugal through John, Prince Regent of 2 October 1797), and Grand Cross of the Real Ordem dos Cavaleiros de Nosso Senhor Jesus Cristo.
- 1st Principe de Godoy di Bassano and Grand Cross of the Order of Saint Januarius and Order of Saint Ferdinand and of Merit of Naples (Italy)
- Grand Sash (Grand Cordon) of the Legion of Honour (France)

== Legacy ==
Lord Byron mentions Godoy in his Childe Harold's Pilgrimage (Canto the First, XLVIII), where a Spanish lusty muleteer... chants "Viva el Rey" / And check his song to execrate Godoy, / The royal wittol Charles... etc. and in the note to these lines he explains that it is to this man that the Spaniards universally impute the ruin of their country.

== See also ==
- Prime Ministers of Spain

== Books referred to ==
- Hilt, Douglas. "Manuel Godoy: Prince of Peace." History Today (Dec. 1971), Vol. 21 Issue 12, pp. 833–841, online.
- Chastenet, Jacques (August 2011). Godoy Master of Spain 1792 1808. BiblioBazaar. ISBN 978-1-178-80415-7.
- "Godoy, Alvarez de Faria, Rios Sanchez y Zarzosa, Manuel de" . Encyclopædia Britannica. Vol. 12 (11th ed.). 1911. pp. 175–176.
- Esdaile, Charles (14 June 2003). The Peninsular War: A New History. Palgrave Macmillan. p. 34. ISBN 978-1-4039-6231-7.
- Herr, Richard (1965). "Good, Evil, and Spain's Rising Against Napoleon". In Gottschalk, Louis (ed.). Ideas in History: Essays Presented to Louis Gottschalk by His Former Students. Books on Demand. pp. 157–181. ISBN 978-0-8357-9107-6.
- Hilt, Douglas (1987). The Troubled Trinity: Godoy and the Spanish Monarchs. University of Alabama Press. ISBN 978-0-8173-0320-4.
- D'Auvergne, Edmund Basil (1912). Godoy: The Queen's Favourite. Stanley Paul & Company.
