= Isabelle Gebhard Neilson =

American socialite (1857–1928)

- Born: Mary Isabelle Gebhard; May 29, 1858; New York City, New York, U.S.
- Died: May 14, 1928 (aged 69); New York City, New York, U.S.
- Spouse: Frederick Neilson (m. 1873; div. 1887)
- Parent(s): Frederick Charles Gebhard; Catherine Davis Gebhard
- Relatives: Thomas E. Davis (grandfather); Frederick Gebhard (brother)

Mary Isabelle Gebhard Neilson (May 29, 1857 – May 14, 1928) was an American society leader during the Gilded Age in New York City.

== Early life ==
Isabelle "Belle" was born on May 29, 1857, at the family mansion at 100 Fifth Avenue in New York City. She was one of three children born to Frederick Charles Gebhard (1825–1865) and Catherine "Kate" (née Davis) Gebhard (1829–1870), who had married in 1850. Her father joined the family firm in 1845, by which time they had expanded their mercantile business and developed interests in banking and rail-road stocks. By 1865, her father had died, and by 1870, her mother had died, leaving the children orphaned and to be raised by their uncle. Her brother, Frederick Gebhard was known for his relationship with Lillie Langtry, a society beauty previously known for her affair with Edward, Prince of Wales. Another brother, Henry Gebhard Jr. died in 1871, aged 10, of scarlet fever.

Gebhard's paternal grandfather had come from Holland to New York in 1800. He worked as an agent for a Dutch company, eventually starting a business importing gin. Between 1830 and 1832, he adopted three children (all siblings), (Note: The three children were Frederick Charles Bruce (1825–1865), William Henry Bruce (1827–1905) and Mary Elizabeth Bruce (1830–1883).) whose surnames were changed by legal enactment from Bruce to Gebhard.

=== Inheritance ===
Her maternal grandfather, Thomas E. Davis, was a wealthy New York property developer who made provisions in his will for Isabelle and her brother to receive incomes from his estate until they were 30, at which time the title of the investment would be transferred to them. In 1893, her brother took legal action on behalf of himself and her to enforce this clause. Their grandfather's estate included properties in New York City. They were each entitled to 1/24th part of this estate plus a part of their aunt Nora's share due to her death in 1874.

Her brother Frederick found himself in reduced circumstances, eventually starting an unsuccessful venture selling fine wines, and needed to borrow money from Isabel. She eventually took court action against him to recover the money (over $65,000).

== Society life ==
Isabelle and her brother inherited wealth, and the family mansion, from the estates of their parents and their grandfather. They were well connected in New York society, being related to many of the old and wealthy American families including Vanderbilt, Stuyvesant, Livingston, Remsen, Neilson, Hunter, Delafleld, Lawrence, Wells and Leverich. Her granduncle was Father John Power, Vicar General of New York; another uncle was John F. A. Sanford, the frontiersman, who via his first marriage had family links to the Pierre Chouteau family of St Louis.

In 1892, the widowed Neilson was included in Ward McAllister's "Four Hundred", purported to be an index of New York's best families, published in The New York Times. Conveniently, 400 was the number of people that could fit into Mrs. Astor's ballroom. According to her obituary in The New York Times, "Mrs. Neilson was noted for her originality. Many years ago, she was the first woman to wear unmatched earrings. She appeared in Newport with a diamond in one ear, and a pearl in the other, and established a vogue for this type of ornamentation." In Newport, Neilson rented Arleigh, the imposing 1893 Queen Anne mansion on Bellevue Avenue at Parker Avenue, that was later occupied by Harry Lehr and his wife, Elizabeth Wharton Drexel.

== Personal life ==
In 1873, Isabelle was married to the "strikingly handsome" Frederick William Hude Neilson (1849–1887). Frederick was the son of William Hude Neilson and Caroline Kane (née Mills) Neilson. His first cousin, Edith (née May) Randolph, (Note: Frederick William Hude Neilson (1849–1887) and Edith (née May) Randolph Whitney (1854–1899) were first cousins as their mother's (Caroline Kane (née Mills) Neilson and Sarah Maria (née Mills) May) were sisters and daughters of Philo L. Mills.) was the second wife of Secretary of the Navy William Collins Whitney. Together, they were the parents of:

- Frederick Gebhard Neilson (1875–1875), who died young.
- Mary Isabelle Neilson (1878–1924), who married Arthur Tryon Kemp (1871–1945) in 1897. They divorced and she remarried to Hollis Horatio Hunnewell (1868–1922), nephew of Frederic Bronson and grandson of H. H. Hunnewell, in 1903.
- Jules Blanc Neilson (1879–1945), who married Marguerite Wall (1881–1936), the daughter of Frank Taylor Wall and Annie Clarke (née Meldrum) Wall, in 1904.
- Cathleen Gebhard Neilson (1885–1927), who married Reginald Claypoole Vanderbilt, the youngest son of Cornelius Vanderbilt II and Alice Claypoole Vanderbilt, in Newport in 1903. After their divorce in 1920, she married Sidney Jones Colford (1885–1951) in 1921.

Around 1884, the Neilson's separated and in March 1887, she sued him for divorce in Newport. She claimed he deserted her and their three children, and the divorce was "speedily granted." He died several months later in July 1887 of Bright's disease while staying at the home of his father in Far Rockaway on Long Island.

Isabelle, who did not remarry, died of cerebral hemorrhage at her apartment in the Plaza Hotel on May 14, 1928, and her funeral was held at St. Patrick's Cathedral and she was buried in the family vault in St Mark's Church in Manhattan.

=== Descendants ===
Through her daughter Mary, she was the grandmother of Mary Isabelle Chiffon Kemp (1900–1965) and Hollis Horatio Hunnewell (1905–1982).

Through her son Jules, she was the grandmother of Frederic William Gebhard Neilson (1904–1937), a Princeton University graduate who was an executive in the press department of the Bank of New York; Alexander Meldrum Neilson (1906–1938); and Isabelle Neilson (1909–1982).

Through her youngest daughter Cathleen, she was the grandmother of Cathleen Vanderbilt (1904–1944), (Note: Cathleen Vanderbilt (1904–1944) was the older half-sister of Gloria Vanderbilt (b. 1924), the fashion designer who married Pasquale DiCicco (1909–1978) in 1941. They divorced in 1945 and that same year she married Leopold Anthony Stokowski (1882–1977). They divorced in 1955 and a year later, in 1956, she married Sidney Arthur Lumet (1924–2011). In 1963, they also divorced and, that same year, she married Wyatt Emory Cooper (1927–1978).) who married Henry Cooke Cushing III in 1923. After their divorce in 1932, she married Lawrence Wise Lowman in 1932. They divorced that same year and in 1940, she married for the third and final time to Martin Arostegui.
