= Jules de Mun =

Julius "Jules" de Mun (1782–1843) was a 19th-century French-American fur trader.

== Early life ==
De Mun was born in Port-au-Prince, Saint-Domingue to an aristocratic family originating from the Southwest of France. He was educated in Paris, before moving to St. Louis in 1800.

== Trading career ==
In September 1815, de Mun went with Auguste Pierre Chouteau and his brother Pierre Chouteau Jr. to the Rocky Mountains on an expedition, to trade horses with the Arapahos and Comanche tribes. After a while, however, the trade began to dwindle and they ceased operations. While trading in Mexico, de Mun was imprisoned alongside A. P. Chouteau for 48 days in Santa Fe, leading the group to file a claim against the Mexican government for confiscated goods worth $30,000. Payment for the claim was not obtained until 1851, through an act of Congress.

In 1817, de Mun opened a trading business with Auguste Pierre Chouteau in St. Louis, known as A. P. Chouteau, de Mun & Co., or Chouteau, De Mun & Sarpy. On 14 September 1818, de Mun dropped out of the business.

== Post-trading career and death ==
In 1820, de Mun moved with his family to Cuba, where he had purchased a large coffee plantation. They returned to St. Louis in 1831 and De Mun was made recorder of deeds for the county. De Mun died in 1843, leaving his property to his wife.

== Family ==
In 1812, de Mun married Isabella Gratiot, the daughter of Charles Gratiot Sr. and Victoire Chouteau and the granddaughter of Pierre Laclède, the founder of Saint Louis (Missouri); they had three daughters.
