= Frederick Gebhard =

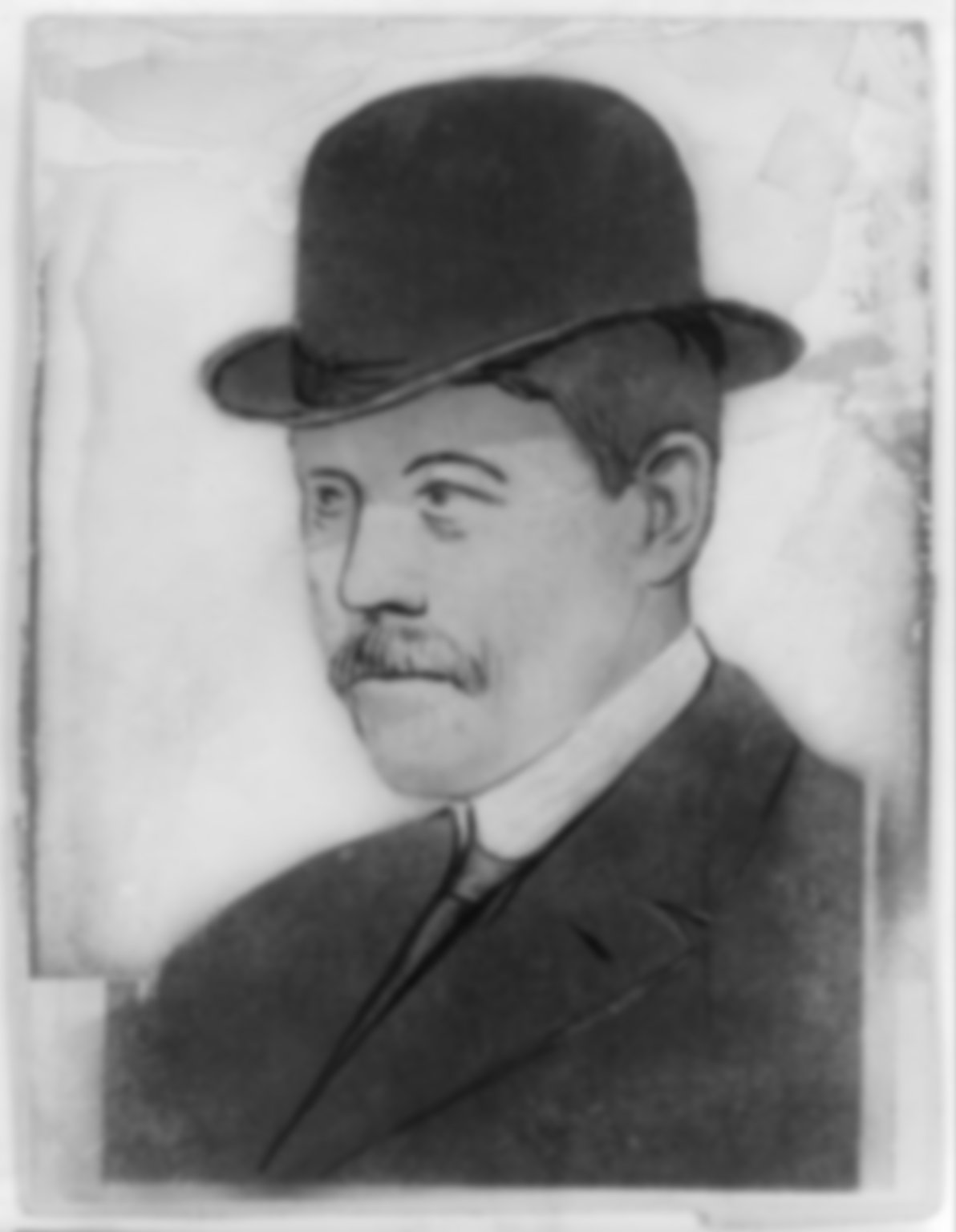
- Frederick Gebhard, retouched photograph
- Born: July 11, 1860; New York City, U.S.
- Died: September 5, 1910 (aged 50); Garden City, New York, U.S.
- Spouses: Louise Hollingsworth Morris (m. 1894; div. 1901) Marie Louise Gamble (m. 1907)
- Relatives: Thomas E. Davis (grandfather); Isabelle Gebhard Neilson (sister)

Frederick Gebhard (July 11, 1860 – September 5, 1910) was a wealthy New Yorker who at the age of 22 became infatuated with Lillie Langtry, a renowned beauty, who had been elevated to celebrity status following her affair with Edward, Prince of Wales. A relationship developed between Gebhard and Langtry that lasted nine years. There was speculation that they would one day marry but this never materialized.

== Early life ==
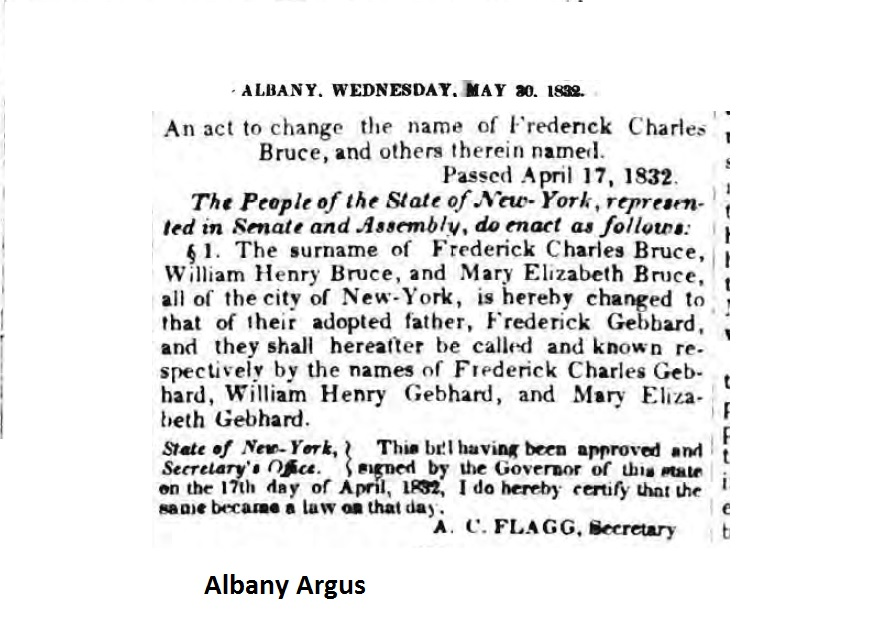
Adoption of three children

Gebhard was born on July 11, 1860. He was one of three children born to Frederick Charles Gebhard (1825–1865) and Catherine "Kate" (née Davis) Gebhard (1829–1870), who had married in 1850. His father joined the family firm in 1845, by which time they had expanded their mercantile business and developed interests in banking and rail-road stocks. By 1865, his father had died, and by 1870, his mother had died, leaving the children orphaned and to be raised by their uncle. His elder sister, Isabelle "Belle" Gebhard, married Frederick Neilson in 1873 and they had three children. Gebhard's niece, Cathleen Neilson, married Reginald Claypoole Vanderbilt in 1903 in Newport. His younger brother, Henry Gebhard Jr. died in 1871 aged 10.

Gebhard's grandfather had come from Holland to New York in 1800. He worked as an agent for a Dutch company, eventually starting a business importing gin. Later his nephew, Frederick Schuchardt and son-in-law, Frederick Favre, became partners. Between 1830 and 1832, he adopted three children (all siblings), (Note: The three children were Frederick Charles Bruce (1825–1865), William Henry Bruce (1827–1905) and Mary Elizabeth Bruce (1830–1883).) whose surnames were changed by legal enactment from Bruce to Gebhard.

Gebhard's maternal grandfather, Thomas E. Davis, a wealthy New York property developer, made provisions in his will for Gebhard and his sister to receive incomes from his estate until they were 30, at which time the title of the investment would be transferred to them. In 1893, Gebhard took legal action on behalf of himself and his sister to enforce this clause. His grandfather's estate included properties in New York City, some in the vicinity of Broadway, Nassau, and William streets, and others uptown. Gebhard and his sister were each entitled to one twenty-fourth part of this estate plus a contested part of their aunt Nora's share due to her death in 1874.

== Society life ==
Gebhard and his sister inherited wealth, and the family mansion at 100 Fifth Avenue, from the estates of their parents and their grandfather. By the time he was 22, Gebhard was described as a young clubman, sportsman, horse owner, and admirer of feminine beauty, both on and off the stage. His interests included breeding race horses, dog breeding, and yachting. He was also a collector of books, ephemera, prints, engravings and autographs. His collection included signed letters of Abraham Lincoln, George Washington and musical scores signed by Verdi and Mendelssohn.

He was well connected in New York society, being related to many of the old and wealthy American families including Vanderbilt, Stuyvesant, Livingston, Remsen, Neilson, Hunter, Delafleld, Lawrence, Wells and Leverich. Other uncles and cousins included bankers such as Frederich Schuchardt and Thomas A. Vyse Jr. His granduncle was Father John Power, Vicar General of New York; he was also related to several European aristocrats, a British admiral and an Irish Member of the British Parliament. Another uncle was John F. A. Sanford, the frontiersman, who via his first marriage had family links to the Pierre Chouteau family of St Louis.

== Personal life ==
In 1882, at the age of 22, Gebhard met Langtry during one of her early stage appearances in New York. She was born on the island of Jersey in 1853, daughter of Dean William le Breton, leader of the island's Church of England. She married in 1874 and moved to London. Her beauty and charm attracted interest in London society including the attention of Edward, Prince of Wales. They began an affair that lasted from about 1877 to 1880. When this relationship cooled, Langtry found herself in financial difficulties and a friend suggested she try acting as a means of raising funds. After an initial try out in London and a successful tour, she was invited to appear in the United States, arriving in New York in 1882. Although still married, she began an affair with Gebhard and the publicity that this generated guaranteed that her stateside tour would be a sell out.

He traveled with Langtry during her stage tours, sometimes being referred to as her “manager”. In the United States a train was adapted for her with a specially designed carriage. The couple purchased adjoining ranches in California, plus Langtry was provided with a house in New York. Langtry also shared Gebhard's interests in horse racing. He owned one of the great distance race horses of the time called Eole, that he shipped to England for the 1885 season. The horse failed to perform, but was also unfortunate to be matched against St. Gatien in the Gold Cup at Ascot. 15 years later, Langtry, who by this time ran her own string of race horses, won the Gold Cup with her horse Merman. During the later years of his relationship with Langtry, Gebhard took little interest in his Guenoc, California ranch, leaving the running to his manager Charles W. Aby, who also ran Langtry's adjacent ranch. In 1893 Gebhard visited his property after an absence of “several years” and claimed that he found the place run down. He dismissed Aby and took court action against him.

Although Eole had failed him in 1885, Gebhard had some success during the English racing season that year with a steeplechaser called Jolly Sir John. He ran him again in 1886 and entered him for the Grand National steeplechase but the horse fell at Valentine's. Gebhard was later involved with the National Steeplechase Association in America. Tom Cannon trained Gebhard's English based horses at his Danebury stables. George Alexander Baird, who would later figure in Langtry's life, had horses in training at the same stable. Several of Gebhard's horses were killed in 1887 when they were being transported by rail in America. The train, en route to California, de-railed and the carriages tumbled down an embankment and caught fire. Another fire in 1900 destroyed the stables in his country home at Westbury, Long Island but the animals were rescued.

Their relationship continued until 1892, despite disapproval from some in their milieu. During the time that they were together it was often rumoured that they would marry, but Langtry's husband refused to give her a divorce. She eventually obtained one in 1897, but by then it was too late for her and Gebhard.

=== Treatment for alcoholism ===
In 1892, Gebhard took treatment at the Keeley Institutes, White Plains, for alcoholism. This was a fashionable treatment that involved injections of bichloride of gold. Later that year, Gebhard's cousin William E. D. Vyse opened a branch of the institute in Babylon, Long Island, with funding reportedly from Gebhard.

=== Marriages ===
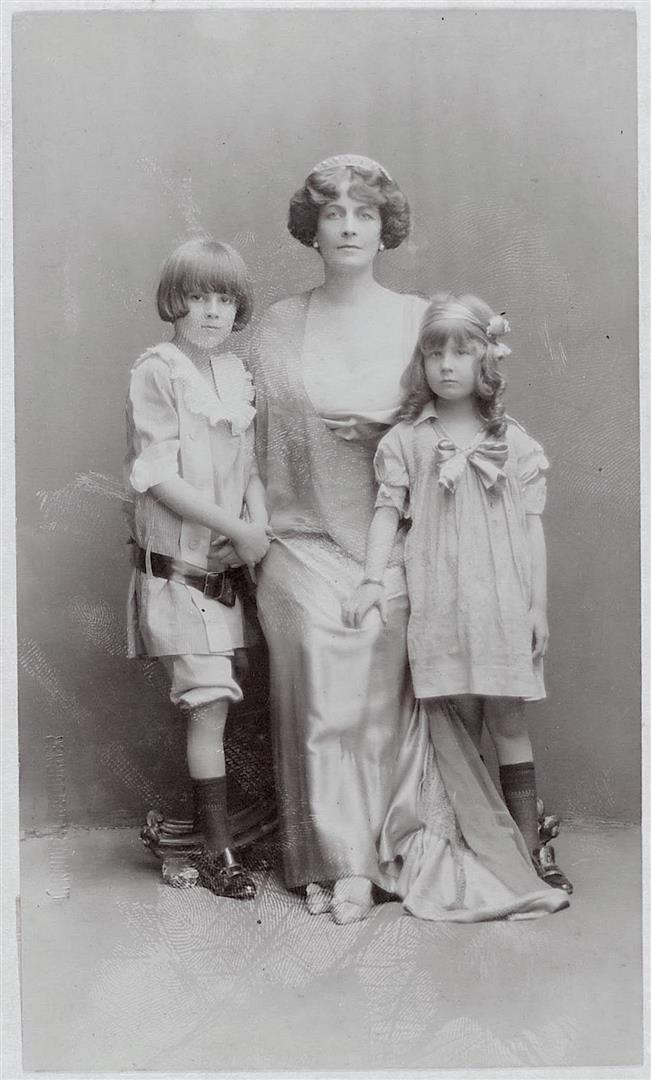
His first wife, Louise Hollingsworth Morris

In 1894, Gebhard married Louise Hollingsworth Morris (1877–1936) of Baltimore; the ceremony was held in the home of her parents and officiated by Maltbie Davenport Babcock a Presbyterian minister. The couple divorced in 1901, he claiming desertion and she claiming he sent her away; the divorce was granted in her favor. Soon after the divorce Louise married Henry Clews Jr., the American-born artist.

Gebhard next married Marie Louise Gamble (1880–1974), an actress known as Marie Wilson, who had been a member of a sextet called the Florodora. The wedding was a secret affair carried out in 1907 by the Baptist minister Rev Harry Marsh Warren, but the details leaked out months later. Warren was known as the "Hotel Parson" because he held services in hotel lobbies and was available at all hour to marry couples on demand. He was also the founder of the National Save a Life League, formed to prevent suicides. Although they parted, Marie returned to nurse Gebhard in his final illness. Following his death in 1910, Marie disputed his will that named his sister Isabelle as sole beneficiary. Marie claimed that a new will had been made before he died; she also claimed that the value of the estate was much higher than the figure declared in the probate.

== Reduced circumstances ==
In later years Gebhard found himself in reduced circumstances. He went into an unsuccessful venture selling fine wines, he also found it necessary to borrow money from his sister. She eventually took court action against him to recover the money (over $65,000).

Gebhard was from a devout Roman Catholic family; his funeral was held at the Catholic Church, Westbury, Long Island, and he was buried in the family vault in St Mark's Church, Manhattan.
