= Alessandro Ruspoli, 9th Prince of Cerveteri =

Italian aristocrat (1924–2005)

Alessandro Ruspoli
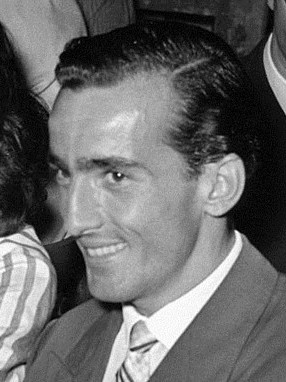

9th Prince of Cerveteri
- Tenure: 1989–2005
- Predecessor: Prince Francesco Ruspoli
- Successor: Prince Francesco Ruspoli
- Born: 9 December 1924; Rome, Kingdom of Italy
- Died: 11 January 2005 (aged 80); Rome, Italy
- Spouse: Francesca dei Baroni Blanc (m. 1947; div. 1953) Nancy de Girard de Charbonnières (m. 1964; div. 1974) Theresa Patricia Genest (m. 1993)
- Issue: Prince Francesco Ruspoli; Princess Melusine Ruspoli; Prince Theodore Ruspoli; Tao Ruspoli; Bartolomeo Ruspoli
- House: Ruspoli
- Father: Prince Francesco Ruspoli
- Mother: Countess Claudia Matarazzo

Alessandro "Dado" Ruspoli, 9th Prince of Cerveteri (Italian pronunciation: [alesˈsandro ˈdaːdo ˈruspoli]; 9 December 1924 – 11 January 2005) was an occasional actor and legendary figure of Rome's dolce vita era in the 1950s and '60s. Known for his eccentric lifestyle and charismatic personality, he was the 9th Prince of Cerveteri, 9th Marquess of Riano, 14th Count of Vignanello and Prince of the Roman Papal States. Dado was famous for his flamboyant walks along Via Veneto, often with a parrot perched on his shoulder, and served as inspiration for Federico Fellini's iconic film La Dolce Vita. Dado descends from a brother of Cardinal Bartolomeo Ruspoli.

== Early life ==
Dado was born in Rome in 1924. His mother, his father's first wife Claudia dei Conti Matarazzo, who died when he was 9, was heiress to one of the largest fortunes in Brazil as daughter of Count Francesco Matarazzo. His father Francesco Ruspoli, 8th Prince of Cerveteri, later a poet, fought in both World Wars.

== Cultural impact and lifestyle ==
Ruspoli became known as a notable figure of the Italian dolce vita, recognized for his presence during the 1950s and 60s. He was known for walking along Via Veneto, often accompanied by a parrot on his shoulder.

Dado's flamboyant lifestyle and magnetic personality served as inspiration for Federico Fellini's iconic 1960 film "La Dolce Vita." His wife Patricia described him as "an alchemist of life, transforming the everyday into the marvelous."

In addition to his social prominence, Dado was a patron of the arts who supported the creation of the Ballets de Paris by Roland Petit and lived through the golden age of dance with Rudolf Nureyev and Margot Fonteyn.

Dado became known for his extravagant lifestyle in the 1950s and 60s. His magnetic presence attracted a constellation of luminaries from the worlds of art, literature, and cinema, including Brigitte Bardot, Salvador Dalí, Truman Capote, Roger Vadim, Roman Polanski, and Emmanuelle Arsan.

== Personal life ==
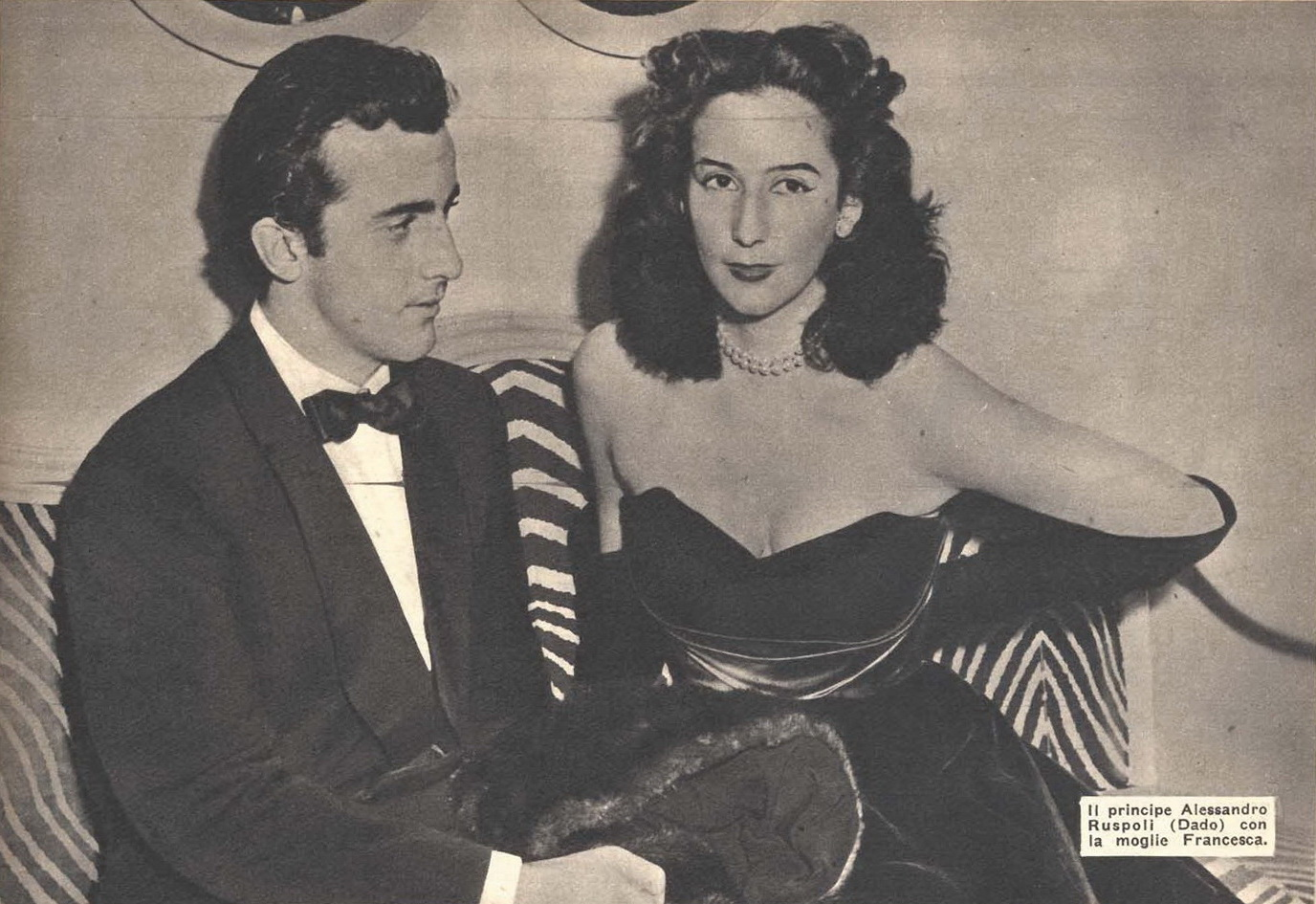
Alessandro Ruspoli, 9th Prince of Cerveteri and his wife, Francesca dei Baroni Blanc

Ruspoli's first marriage, in Rome on 8 December 1947, was to Nobile Francesca dei Baroni Blanc (1920–1962), daughter of Nobile Mario dei Baroni Blanc and wife Anita Felici. She died in Milan on 27 February 1962. They had no children.

=== Second marriage ===
Ruspoli's second marriage was on 5 May 1964 at Vignanello, the location of the ancestral residence, Castello Ruspoli, to French aristocrat Nancy de Girard de Charbonnières (b. 1939), daughter of Roger Jean de Girard de Charbonnières and wife Andrée Marie Pommarède. Before their divorce in 1974, they were the parents of one son:

- Don Francesco, Principe Ruspoli (b. 1967), being 10th Prince of Cerveteri and head of the Ruspoli family since the death of his father in 2005. He married Donna Angelica Visconti di Ozzano (granddaughter of Salvatore Ferragamo), they had a son and a daughter.

=== Relationship with Debra Berger ===
Following his divorce from Nancy, he had a relationship with actress Debra Berger (b. 1957), a daughter of William Berger. They never married but were the parents of two sons:

- Tao dei Principi Ruspoli (b. 1975), who married actress Olivia Wilde in 2003; they divorced in 2011 without issue.
- Bartolomeo dei Principi Ruspoli (b. 1978), who married Aileen Getty, a daughter of John Paul Getty Jr. and first wife Abigail "Gail" Harris, in November 2004; without issue.

=== Third marriage ===
Ruspoli's third marriage was also in Rome, on 20 November 1993, to Theresa Patricia Genest. This marriage produced a daughter and a son:

- Donna Mathilde Mélusine dei Principi Ruspoli (b. 1994), a socialite.
- Don Théodore Alexandre dei Principi Ruspoli (b. 1997)

== Legacy and centenary ==
In December 2024, Rome celebrated the centenary of Dado's birth with events honoring his contribution to Italian culture and cinema. His widow Patricia Ruspoli organized commemorative events, with his son Théodore reading excerpts from Dado's poetry collection "Le pulsazioni del silenzio" (The Pulsations of Silence). Plans were made for additional commemorative events in Vignanello, the ancestral seat that Dado considered his "place of the heart."

== Filmography ==
- Identification of a Woman (1982) - Mavi's father
- Les italiens (1989) - un inquisitore
- The Godfather Part III (1990) - Vanni
- Faccione (1991)
- La casa del sorriso aka The House of Smiles (1991) - Andrea
- Il giardino dei ciliegi aka The Cherry Orchard (1992)
- The Young Indiana Jones Chronicles (1 episode, "Florence, May 1908", 1993) - Professor Reale
- Just Say Know (2002) - Himself
- The Adventures of Young Indiana Jones: The Perils of Cupid (2007) (V) - Professor Reale
- Marco Ferreri, il regista che venne dal futuro (2007) - Himself

== Ancestry ==
Ancestors of Alessandro Ruspoli, 9th Prince of Cerveteri

16. Don Giovanni Nepomucene Ruspoli, 5th Prince of Cerveteri
8. Don Francesco Maria Ruspoli, 6th Prince of Cerveteri
17. Donna Barbara dei Principi Massimo
4. Don Alessandro Ruspoli, 7th Prince of Cerveteri
18. Luigi, Count Franchesi
9. Egle dei Conti Franchesi
19. Donna Laura Boncompagni Ludovisi dei Principi di Piombino
2. Don Francesco Ruspoli, 8th Prince of Cerveteri
20. Don Pietro Lante Montefeltro della Rovere
10. Don Antonio Lante Montefeltro della Rovere, Duke Lante Montefeltro della Rovere, Prince of Cantalupo
21. Donna Angela Lante Montefeltro della Rovere
5. Donna Marianita dei Duchi Lante Montefeltro della Rovere
22. Thomas E. Davis
11. Mathilde Davis
23. Anne Power
1. Alessandro Ruspoli, 9th Prince of Cerveteri, 9th Marquess of Riano and 14th Count of Vignanello
24. Francesco Antonio Matarazzo
12. Doctor Costabile Matarazzo
25. Giuseppa Ronzio
6. Francesco, 1st Count Matarazzo
26. Luigi Jovane
13. Mariangela Jovane
27. Donna Anna Bignami
3. Claudia dei Conti Matarazzo
14. Donato Sansivieri
7. Filomena Sansivieri
15. Irene Aniello

== See also ==
- Tao Ruspoli
- Ruspoli

Italian nobility
Preceded by Francesco Ruspoli, 8th Prince of Cerveteri	Prince of Cerveteri; 1989–2005	Succeeded by Francesco Ruspoli, 10th Prince of Cerveteri
