= Nothing Left Unsaid: Gloria Vanderbilt & Anderson Cooper =

Nothing Left Unsaid: Gloria Vanderbilt & Anderson Cooper is a 2016 documentary film about Gloria Vanderbilt and Anderson Cooper.
