= Little Gloria... Happy at Last =

1982 television miniseries directed by Waris Hussein

- Based on: Little Gloria...Happy at Last by Barbara Goldsmith
- Written by: William Hanley
- Directed by: Waris Hussein
- Starring: Lucy Gutteridge; Angela Lansbury; Bette Davis; Christopher Plummer; Maureen Stapleton; Martin Balsam; Barnard Hughes; Glynis Johns; John Hillerman; Michael Gross; Joseph Maher
- Composer: Berthold Carrière
- Countries of origin: United States; United Kingdom
- Original language: English
- No. of episodes: 2

Production
- Executive producers: Edgar Scherick; Scott Rudin
- Producers: David Nicksay; Justine Héroux
- Cinematography: Tony Imi
- Editor: Malcolm Cooke
- Running time: 180 minutes
- Production companies: Cine-Gloria; Edgar J. Scherick Associates; Metromedia Producers Corporation; London Films Productions

Original release
- Network: NBC
- Release: October 24 – October 25, 1982

Little Gloria...Happy at Last is a 1982 American-British biographical drama television miniseries directed by Waris Hussein and written by William Hanley, based on the 1980 book of the same name by Barbara Goldsmith. It stars Lucy Gutteridge as socialite Gloria Morgan Vanderbilt and Angela Lansbury as her sister-in-law, Gertrude Vanderbilt Whitney, with Bette Davis, Christopher Plummer, Maureen Stapleton, Martin Balsam, Barnard Hughes, Glynis Johns, John Hillerman, Michael Gross, and Joseph Maher in supporting roles.

The miniseries received generally positive reviews from critics and six Primetime Emmy Award nominations, including Outstanding Drama Special and acting nods for Lansbury and Davis. It also earned Gutteridge a Golden Globe Award nomination for Best Actress in a Miniseries or Television Film.

== Plot ==
Based on the book by Barbara Goldsmith, it tells the story of the real-life heiress Gloria Vanderbilt and how her parents met and married. Gloria Vanderbilt was left a very rich girl at the age of eighteen months when her father died. When Gloria was ten, her mother, Gloria Morgan Vanderbilt, contested the child's custody with little Gloria's aunt, launching one of the most notorious court cases of the last century.

== Cast ==
- Lucy Gutteridge as Gloria Morgan Vanderbilt
- Angela Lansbury as Gertrude Vanderbilt Whitney
- Bette Davis as Alice Gwynne Vanderbilt
- Maureen Stapleton as Nurse Emma Kieslich
- Martin Balsam as Nathan Burkan
- Glynis Johns as Laura Fitzpatrick Morgan
- John Hillerman as Maury Paul
- Michael Gross as Gilchrist
- Jennifer Dundas as Little Gloria
- Rosalyn Landor as Thelma Morgan
- Leueen Willoughby as Consuelo Morgan
- Christopher Plummer as Reginald Claypoole Vanderbilt
- Ken Pogue as Judge James Aloycious Foley
- Barnard Hughes as Judge John Francis Carew
- Joseph Maher as Smythe

== Release ==
Little Gloria...Happy at Last aired on NBC on October 24 and 25, 1982.

== Awards and nominations ==
Year	Award	Category	Nominee(s)	Result	Ref.
1983	40th Golden Globe Awards	Best Actress in a Miniseries or Television Film	Lucy Gutteridge	Nominated	
1983	35th Primetime Emmy Awards	Outstanding Drama Special	Justine Héroux; David Nicksay; Scott Rudin; Edgar Scherick	Nominated	
1983	35th Primetime Emmy Awards	Outstanding Lead Actress in a Limited Series or a Special	Angela Lansbury	Nominated	
1983	35th Primetime Emmy Awards	Outstanding Supporting Actress in a Limited Series or a Special	Bette Davis	Nominated	
1983	35th Primetime Emmy Awards	Outstanding Writing in a Limited Series or a Special	William Hanley	Nominated	
1983	35th Primetime Emmy Awards	Outstanding Art Direction for a Limited Series or a Special	Enrico Campana; Guy J. Comtois; Doug Kraner; Maurice Leblanc; Stuart Wurtzel	Nominated	
1983	35th Primetime Emmy Awards	Outstanding Costume Design for a Limited Series or a Special	Julie Weiss	Nominated	
