= Melusine (disambiguation) =

Melusine is a figure of European legends and folklore.

Melusine or Melusina may also refer to:

- 373 Melusina, a main-belt asteroid
- Melusina, Countess of Walsingham (1693-1778)
- Melusine (company), an animation company based in Luxembourg
- Mélusine (comics), a Belgian comic book series first published by Dupuis in 1995
- Mélusine (novel), a fantasy novel by Sarah Monette
- Melusine (Reimann), a 1971 opera
- Mélusine, a French magazine founded by Henri Gaidoz and E. Rolland
- "Mélusine", a 2005 song by Nolwenn Leroy from Histoires Naturelles
- Mélusine (album), 2023 album by Cécile McLorin Salvant

== People ==
- Melusine von der Schulenburg, Duchess of Kendal (1667–1743), mistress to George I
- Melusina von der Schulenburg, Countess of Walsingham (1693–1778), daughter of George I
- Mélusine Mayance (born 1999), French actress
- Mélusine Ruspoli (born 1994), Italian model and aristocrat
- Melusine Sparkle, Brazilian drag queen
