= Francesco Ruspoli, 8th Prince of Cerveteri =

Prince of Cerveteri (1899–1989)

Francesco Ruspoli
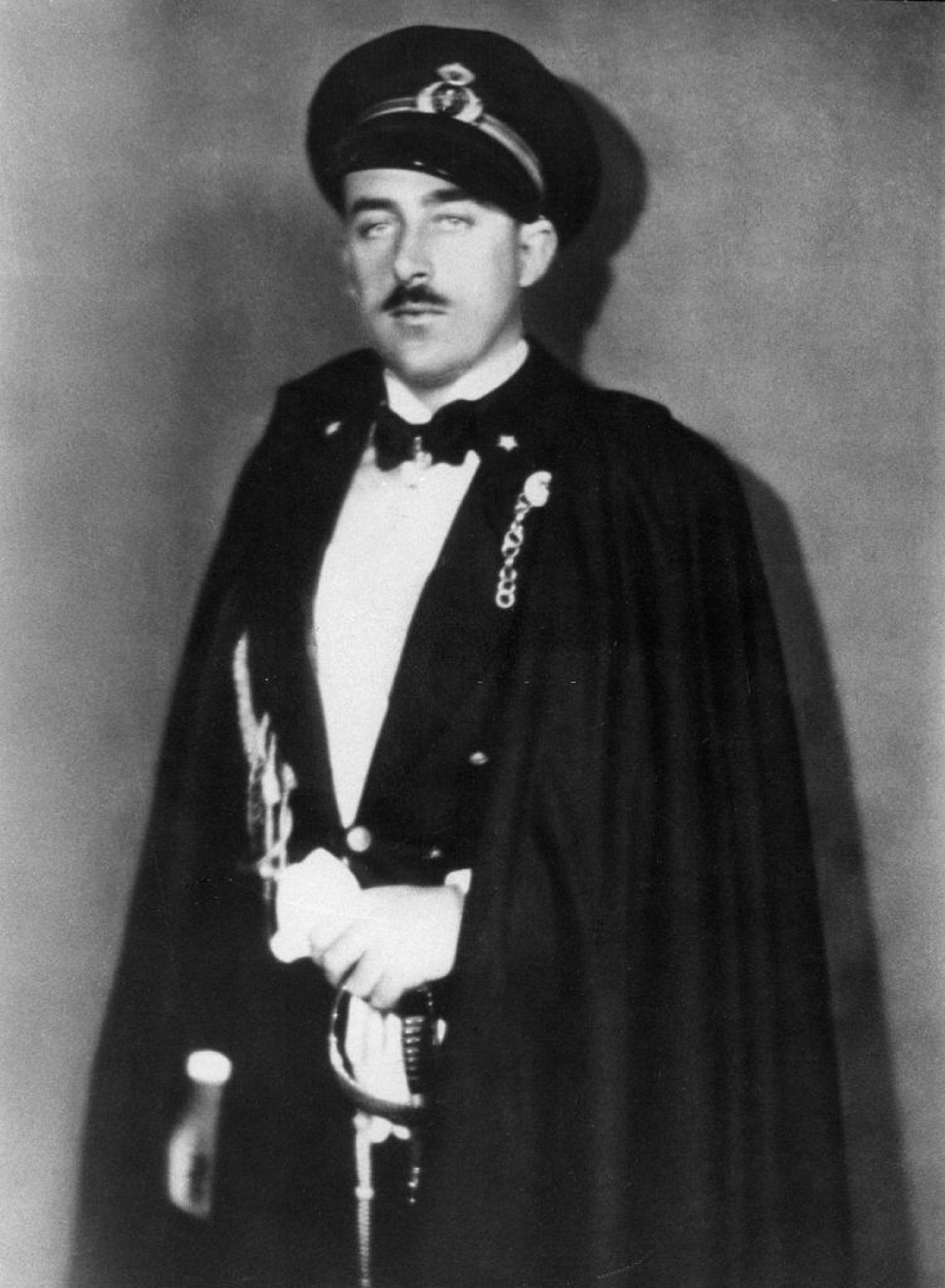

8th Prince of Cerveteri
- Tenure: 1952–1989
- Predecessor: Prince Alessandro Ruspoli
- Successor: Prince Alessandro Ruspoli
- Born: 23 February 1899; Rome, Kingdom of Italy
- Died: 2 October 1989 (aged 90); Rome, Italy
- Spouse: Countess Claudia Matarazzo; Maria Celeste Rossi
- Issue: 2, including Prince Alessandro Ruspoli
- House: Ruspoli
- Father: Prince Alessandro Ruspoli

Francesco, Principe Ruspoli (23 February 1899 – 27 October 1989) was the 8th Principe di Cerveteri, 8th Marchese di Riano, 13th Conte di Vignanello and Prince of the Holy Roman Empire. He was also Noble Guard.

Son of Alessandro Ruspoli, 7th Prince of Cerveteri and wife Marianita dei Duchi Lante Montefeltro della Rovere. His maternal grandmother was an American heiress from New York City, New York.

== Marriages and children ==
He married firstly in São Paulo, São Paulo, on 28 February 1924, Claudia dei Conti Matarazzo (Castellabate, 12 March 1899 – Rome, 30 October 1935), daughter of Francesco, 1st Conte Matarazzo, Italian-Brazilian industrialist and tycoon, and wife Filomena Sansivieri, and grandaunt of Brazilian television and film director Jayme Monjardim, heiress to one of the largest fortunes in Brazil, by whom he had two sons:

- Alessandro Ruspoli, 9th Prince of Cerveteri.
- Don Sforza Marescotto dei Principi Ruspoli (Rome, 23 January 1927 –), married firstly at Migliarino on 30 November 1946 and divorced in 1983 Flavia Domitilla dei Duchi Salviati (Rome, 28 April 1925 – Migliarino Pisano, 6 April 2007), and had two daughters. And married secondly at Vignanello on 15 October 1983 Pia Giancaro (Palermo, 12 March 1950, and had one daughter:
  - Donna Claudia dei Principi Ruspoli (São Paulo, São Paulo, 30 August 1947 –), unmarried and without issue.
  - Donna Giada dei Principi Ruspoli (Rome, 8 March 1949 –), married firstly Giovanni Angelo Theodoli di San Vito e Pisoniano, 6th Duke of Nemi (Bologna, 1 May 1942). Se has two sons with Luiz Misasi: Marco and Paulo Misasi.
  - Giacinta Ortensia Rosa Maria dei Principi Ruspoli (Paris, 3 March 1988 –), married Alessio Rossi.

He married secondly, on 4 May 1946, Maria Celeste Rossi (3 October 1916 – Rome, 12 February 1997), without issue.

== Ancestry ==
Ancestors of Francesco Ruspoli, 8th Prince of Cerveteri

16. Don Alessandro Ruspoli, 4th Prince of Cerveteri
8. Don Giovanni Nepomucene Ruspoli, 5th Prince of Cerveteri
17. Countess Mariana Esterházy de Galántha
4. Don Francesco Maria Ruspoli, 6th Prince of Cerveteri
18. Don Camillo Massimo, 1st Prince of Arsoli
9. Donna Barbara dei Principi Massimo
19. Countess Maria Christina von der Lausitz (daughter of Prince Francis Xavier of Saxony)
2. Don Alessandro Ruspoli, 7th Prince of Cerveteri
20. Pier Girolamo, Count Franchesi
10. Luigi, Count Franchesi
21. Luisa Gatteschi
5. Egle dei Conti Franchesi
22. Don Giuseppe Boncompagni-Ludovisi dei Principi di Piombino
11. Donna Laura Boncompagni-Ludovisi dei Principi di Piombino
23. Maria Celeste Gervasi
1. Francesco Ruspoli, 8th Prince of Cerveteri, 8th Marquess of Riano and 13th Count of Vignanello
24. Don Filippo Lante Montefeltro della Rovere, 4th Duke of Bomarzo, 3rd Prince of Belmonte (grandson of Antonio Lante Montefeltro della Rovere)
12. Don Pietro Lante Montefeltro della Rovere
25. Faustina dei Marchesi Capranaica
6. Don Antonio Lante Montefeltro della Rovere, Duke Lante Montefeltro della Rovere, Prince of Cantalupo
26. Don Vincenzo Lante Montefeltro della Rovere, 6th Duke of Bomarzo, Prince of Cantalupo
13. Donna Angela Lante Montefeltro della Rovere
27. Margherita dei Conti Marescotti
3. Donna Marianita dei Duchi Lante Montefeltro della Rovere
14. Thomas E. Davis
7. Mathilde Davis
30. Andrew Power
15. Anne Power

== See also ==
- Ruspoli

Italian nobility
Preceded by Alessandro Ruspoli, 7th Prince of Cerveteri	Prince of Cerveteri; 1952–1989	Succeeded by Alessandro Ruspoli, 9th Prince of Cerveteri
