= Gloria Morgan Vanderbilt =

American socialite (1904–1965)

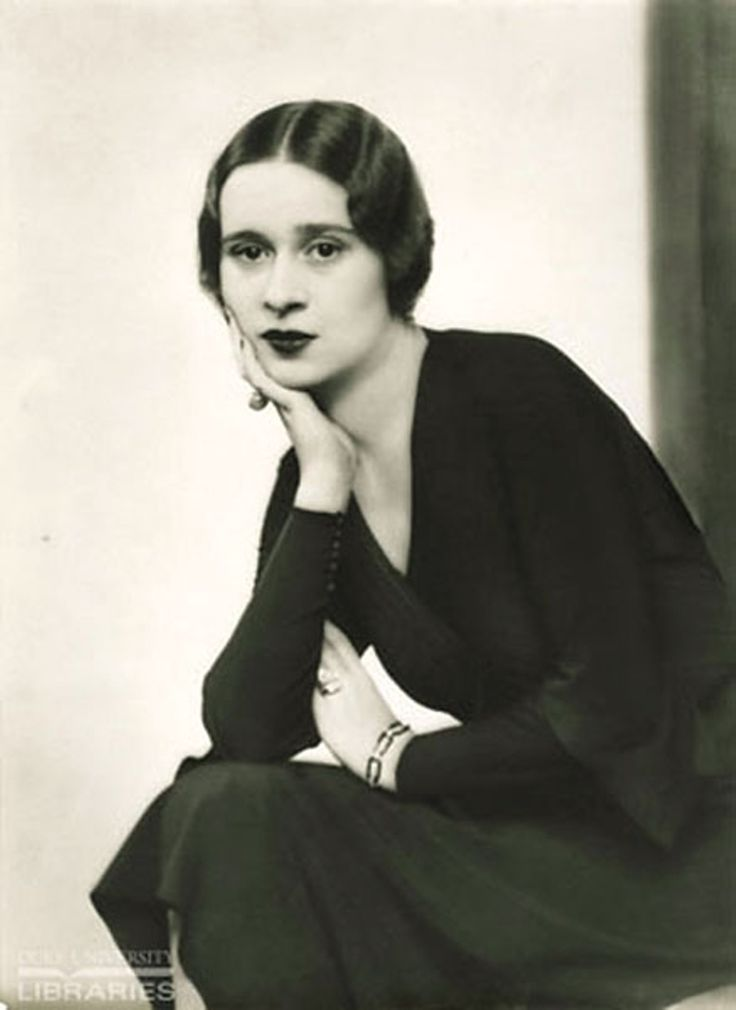
- Vanderbilt in 1933
- Born: Maria Mercedes Morgan; 23 August 1904; Grand Hotel National, Lucerne, Switzerland
- Died: 13 February 1965 (aged 60); Los Angeles County, California, U.S.
- Burial place: Holy Cross Cemetery, Culver City, California
- Education: Strathalan House, Scotland; Convent schools in Spain and Switzerland; Convent of the Sacred Heart; Skerton Finishing School; Miss Nightingale's School
- Occupation: Socialite
- Spouse: Reginald Claypoole Vanderbilt (m. 1923; died 1925)
- Children: Gloria Laura Vanderbilt
- Relatives: Vanderbilt family (by marriage)

Gloria Morgan Vanderbilt (born Maria Mercedes Morgan; 23 August 1904 – 13 February 1965) was an American socialite. Vanderbilt was the mother of fashion designer and artist Gloria Vanderbilt and maternal grandmother of television journalist Anderson Cooper. She was a central figure in Vanderbilt vs. Whitney, one of the most sensational American custody trials in the 20th century.

== Early life and family ==
Born at the Grand Hotel National in Lucerne, Switzerland, as Maria Mercedes Morgan, she was a daughter of Henry Hays Morgan, Sr. (1860–1933), an American diplomat who served as U.S. consul general in Buenos Aires, Argentina; Berlin, Germany; Amsterdam, Netherlands; Havana, Cuba; and Brussels, Belgium. Her mother was his second wife, the former Laura Delphine Kilpatrick (1877–1956); the couple married in 1894 and divorced in 1927.

Her maternal grandfather, Hugh Judson Kilpatrick (1836–1881), was a Union Army general during the American Civil War, who also served as the U.S. minister to Chile. Her maternal grandmother, Luisa Kilpatrick, née Valdivieso Araoz, was a member of a wealthy Chilean family that had emigrated from Spain in the 17th century.

Morgan, who adopted the name Gloria as a teenager, had five siblings:

- Laura Consuelo Morgan (17 December 1901 – 26 August 1979), aka Tamar. She married Count Jean de Maupas du Juglart, Ambassador Benjamin Thaw Jr., and Alfons B. Landa (né Alfonso Beaumont Howard Landa).
- Thelma Morgan (1904–1970), her identical twin. She became a mistress of Edward, Prince of Wales and married James Vail Converse and Marmaduke Furness, 1st Viscount Furness.
- Harry Hays Morgan Jr. (1898–1983), who became a film actor. He was married to Ivor Elizabeth O'Connor, Edith Churchill Gordon, and Sybil Robertina "Robin" Boyce Willys.
- Constance Morgan (1887–1892), a half sister, a child of her father's first marriage to Mary E. Edgerton.
- Gladys Morgan (14 September 1889 – 15 August 1958), another half sister from her father's first marriage; she was known as Margaret and married Lieut. John W. Henderson in 1919 in New York.

Gloria Morgan was educated by governesses and in convents in Europe as well as New York City, where she attended the Catholic Convent of the Sacred Heart, the Skerton Finishing School, and Miss Nightingale's School. In October 1921, with their father's permission, Morgan and her sister Thelma, both reportedly 16 years of age, ended their schooling and moved by themselves into an apartment at 40 Fifth Avenue, a private townhouse. The sisters had some minor roles in silent movies, using the names Gloria and Thelma Rochelle. Their debuts were as extras in the 1922 Marion Davies vehicle The Young Diana.

Known as "The Magnificent Morgans", Gloria and Thelma Morgan were popular fixtures in the American high society, even as teenagers. British photographer Cecil Beaton described them as "alike as two magnolias, and with their marble complexions, raven tresses, and flowing dresses, with their slight lisps and foreign accents, they diffuse a Ouida atmosphere of hothouse elegance and lacy femininity. ... Their noses are like begonias, with full-blown nostrils, their lips richly carved, and they should have been painted by Sargent, with arrogant heads and affected hands, in white satin with a bowl of white peonies near by."

== Marriage and widowhood ==
On 6 March 1923, in New York City, at the townhouse of friends, Gloria Morgan — then 18 years of age and having received the legal consent of her father to wed — became the second wife of Reginald Claypoole Vanderbilt, age 42, an heir to the Vanderbilt railroad fortune.

On 20 February 1924, their only child, Gloria Laura, was born in New York City.

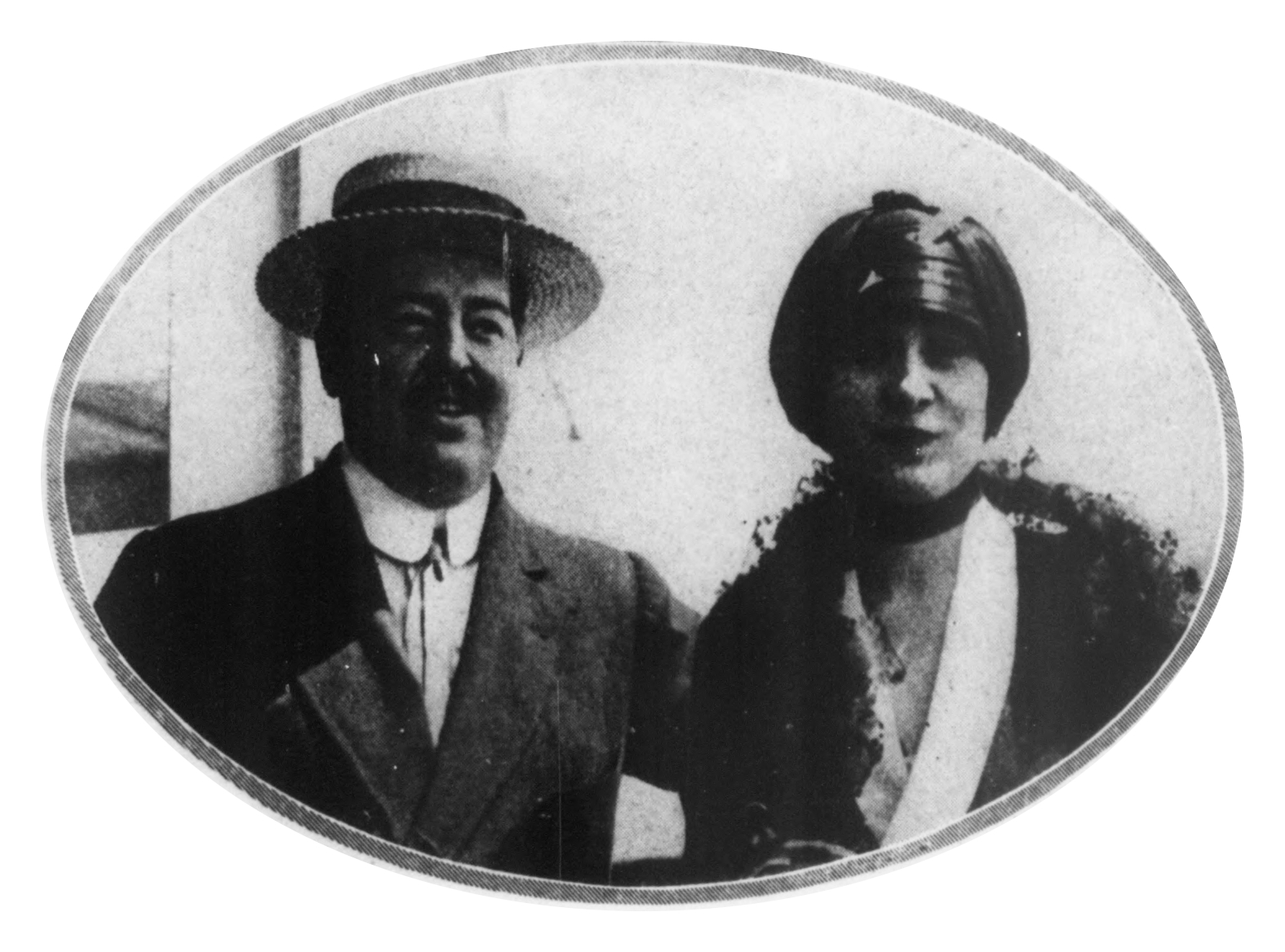
The recently wed Vanderbilts returning from their European honeymoon

Reginald Vanderbilt died on 4 September 1925 of what was described in news reports as "a throat infection which had caused internal hemorrhages" or cirrhosis due to alcoholism. Following his death, his young widow became the administrator of a $2.5 million trust left to their daughter, Gloria, and spent the better part of the next six years living in Paris, Biarritz, and London, with her mother and child and often in the company of her sisters and brother, all of whom lived in France and England with their respective spouses.

However, the conditions of Vanderbilt's will and the custody of their child were complicated by the general belief that his widow had not reached the legal age of majority, which meant that she required a guardian. Gloria Morgan Vanderbilt believed that she was 20, rather than 21, because her mother had long declared the twins' birth year as 1905 rather than 1904. The discrepancy was discovered upon an examination of the Morgan twins' childhood passports and their birth certificates during the Vanderbilt custody trial in 1934. No reason, however, was given as to the change of birth years. As Gloria Morgan Vanderbilt wrote in her 1936 memoirs, Without Prejudice (E P Dutton), "Had I not thought myself a minor at this time ... there would have been no necessity for a guardian for myself ... [or] for a legal guardian for my child's person .... On this untruth—irrevocable and irremediable—hinged the currents of my child's life and my own."

== Custody trial ==
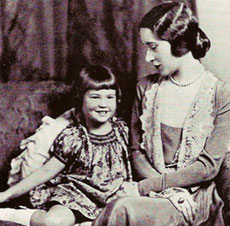
Vanderbilt with her daughter "Little Gloria"

Influenced by reports from private detectives as well as family servants and Laura Morgan (who appears by all published accounts to have been somewhat emotionally and mentally unbalanced and who testified on Mrs. Whitney's side at the trial), members of the Vanderbilt family came to believe that Gloria Morgan Vanderbilt was a bad influence and neglectful of her daughter. A custody battle erupted that made national headlines in 1934. As a result of a great deal of hearsay evidence admitted at trial, the scandalous allegations of Vanderbilt's lifestyle—including a purported lesbian relationship with Nadezhda de Torby, the Marchioness of Milford Haven, and a brief engagement to Gottfried, Prince of Hohenlohe-Langenburg—led to a new standard in tabloid newspaper sensationalism.

Vanderbilt lost custody of her daughter to her sister-in-law Gertrude Vanderbilt Whitney. Granted limited parental rights, Vanderbilt was allowed to see young Gloria on weekends in New York. The court also removed Vanderbilt as administrator of her daughter's trust fund, whose annual investment income had been her only source of support. Two years later, the custody issue was re-opened, giving her another chance to re-gain guardianship of her daughter. This time, the case was brought before the Supreme Court of the United States. The court declined to hear the matter and it once again came before the State of New York's Supreme Court. The result was an agreement that Gloria would spend more time with her mother than was previously granted. In 1946, the widow was once more in the news when her daughter announced she would no longer be paying her mother an annual $21,000 allowance. Saying that her mother was able to work and had done so in the past, Gloria Vanderbilt stated the annual allowance would now be given to a charity for blind and starving children.

== Later years ==
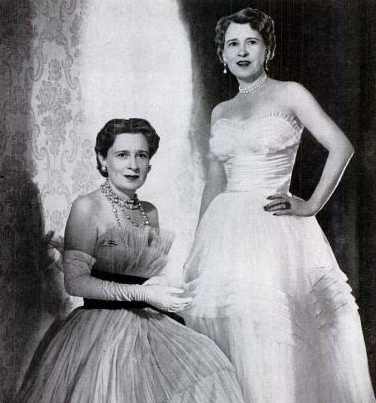
Gloria Morgan Vanderbilt (left) with her identical twin, Thelma, Viscountess Furness, in 1955

From the 1940s until their deaths, Gloria and her sister Thelma Furness, Viscountess Furness lived together in New York City and in Los Angeles, California. They wrote a dual memoir called Double Exposure: A Twin Autobiography, published in 1958.

Vanderbilt died in 1965 of cancer and was interred at Holy Cross Cemetery in Culver City, California. She and her siblings were Catholic; her stepdaughter Cathleen was baptized also as Catholic.

== Personal life ==
Regarding her mother's relationship with Nada, Lady Milford-Haven, Vanderbilt's daughter later wrote:

I was at school, at Farmington, when I realized for the first time that what those boys had done to each other, what I had with my friend, had something in common with my mother and the energetic Lady Milford-Haven. The realization terrified me. [...] A scarlett letter - Lesbian - publicly branded on my mother would hover as a shadow over me, and the humiliation she experienced haunted me for years. It took me a long time to resolve the feelings I had about her bisexuality, and until I did, there was the hovering fear that I might be like her. In my head I knew there would be nothing wrong in that, but knowing and believing are two different things.

== Portrayals ==
- In 1978, a New York City socialite and writer, Philip Van Rensselaer, wrote a book about Gloria Morgan Vanderbilt titled That Vanderbilt Woman.
- Gloria Morgan Vanderbilt was portrayed by British actress Lucy Gutteridge in the 1982 television miniseries Little Gloria ... Happy at Last.

== Sources ==
- Gloria Morgan Vanderbilt, with Palma Wayne, Without Prejudice (E P Dutton, 1936)
- Gloria Morgan Vanderbilt and Thelma, Lady Furness, Double Exposure: A Twin Autobiography (D McKay, 1958)
