= Gitano Group Inc. =

Fashion apparel company

Gitano Group Inc. was a company that manufactured jeans. They filed for bankruptcy protection in 1994.

== History ==
An Israeli immigrant family, the Dabahs began the business in the late 1960s, expanded with help from another such family in the early 1970s, and in 1977 added use of the Spanish word Gitano (gypsy) as a brand name. Marketing and funding were key; they used Crazy Eddie's stockbroker.

They tried their hand at retail: by 1992 Gitano was operating 100 stores., in addition to selling to Walmart and running a separately managed 130-store chain, Children's Place. Actual manufacturing was being done in 40 countries, and some import/export laws were violated, at least twice. By then, rights to the Gloria Vanderbilt name had been purchased.

Beginning early 1993 an outsider CEO truncated the company's staff, 3,600 staff at its high point, to 150 employees, and likewise some of Gitano's debt. Fruit of the Loom bought the firm, but for less than Gitano's outstanding debt. By then, more than a year had passed since the founding family had filed for bankruptcy.

Marketing had been an important part of their operation, and it was important to the industry and the era. One competitor headlined

We Believe People Should be Price Conscious.
They Should Remain Conscious After They See The Price.

Looking back after Gitano's downfall, The New York Times described them as "once the largest manufacturer in the United States of moderately priced women's jeans."
