= Mohan Murjani =

Indian businessman

- Born: 1946 (age 79–80); Sindh, India
- Citizenship: Indian
- Occupations: Businessman, fashion entrepreneur
- Years active: 1960s–present
- Known for: Developing and launching international designer brands
- Notable work: Gloria Vanderbilt, Tommy Hilfiger, Coca-Cola Clothing
- Title: Chairman of the Murjani Group
- Children: 1 Malini Murjani
- Family: Murjani family (business)

Mohan "Mike" Murjani is a Hong Kong based Indian fashion entrepreneur and the chairman of the Murjani Group, a global brand-development company best known for launching and building several designer lifestyle labels.

Murjani is particularly known for creating the Gloria Vanderbilt designer jeans in the 1970s, the first major designer-label denim line for women, in partnership with American heiress Gloria Vanderbilt. The debut “Gloria Vanderbilt by Murjani” jeans, featuring her signature and swan icon, became a commercial success.

Under his leadership, the Murjani Group later launched and developed other major brands, including Tommy Hilfiger, which the group helped bring to market in 1985. The group also expanded into luxury retail and real estate projects, including the Vanderbilt Estate. As of 2008, Murjani continued to oversee brand-building efforts while residing in Phuket, remaining active in international fashion and luxury markets.

== Early life ==
Murjani was born in Hyderabad, Sindh, in British India, to a Sindhi Hindu family and was raised in Hong Kong and educated in the United Kingdom and the United States. His late father B.K.Murjani founded The Murjani Group in 1930. He joined his family business in 1966 and played a major role in transforming it into a designer-branding enterprise.

== Career ==
Murjani joined the family business in 1966, founded by his father, the late B.K. Murjani. In 1930, the Murjani Group moved from retailing in Shanghai, to being one of the largest apparel producer in the World. In 1966, the Group launched its first brand in the United States, "Marco Polo", culminating in 1975 with the launch of the First Designer Jeans in the World, Gloria Vanderbilt, followed by Tommy Hilfiger in 1985.

In 2004, the Murjani group launched the First International Designer Brand in India, Tommy Hilfiger. Murjani then continued launching further brands in India including Gucci, Jimmy Choo, Bottega Veneta, Calvin Klein and French Connection.

In 2007, the Murjani group built India’s first luxury mall, The Galleria, in Mumbai. In 2015, Murjani commenced building The Vanderbilt Estate in Phuket. This was completed in 2022.
