= Malini Murjani =

American fashion designer

Malini Murjani is a Manhattan-based accessories designer. Her handbags and belts are sold by Bergdorf Goodman, Saks, and Bloomingdale's.

== Early life ==
Malini Murjani was born in Hong Kong to Sindhi Indian fashion entrepreneur Mohan Murjani and Turkish mother Guni Murjani. She attended boarding school in England.
