= Cathleen Vanderbilt =

American heiress (1904–1944)

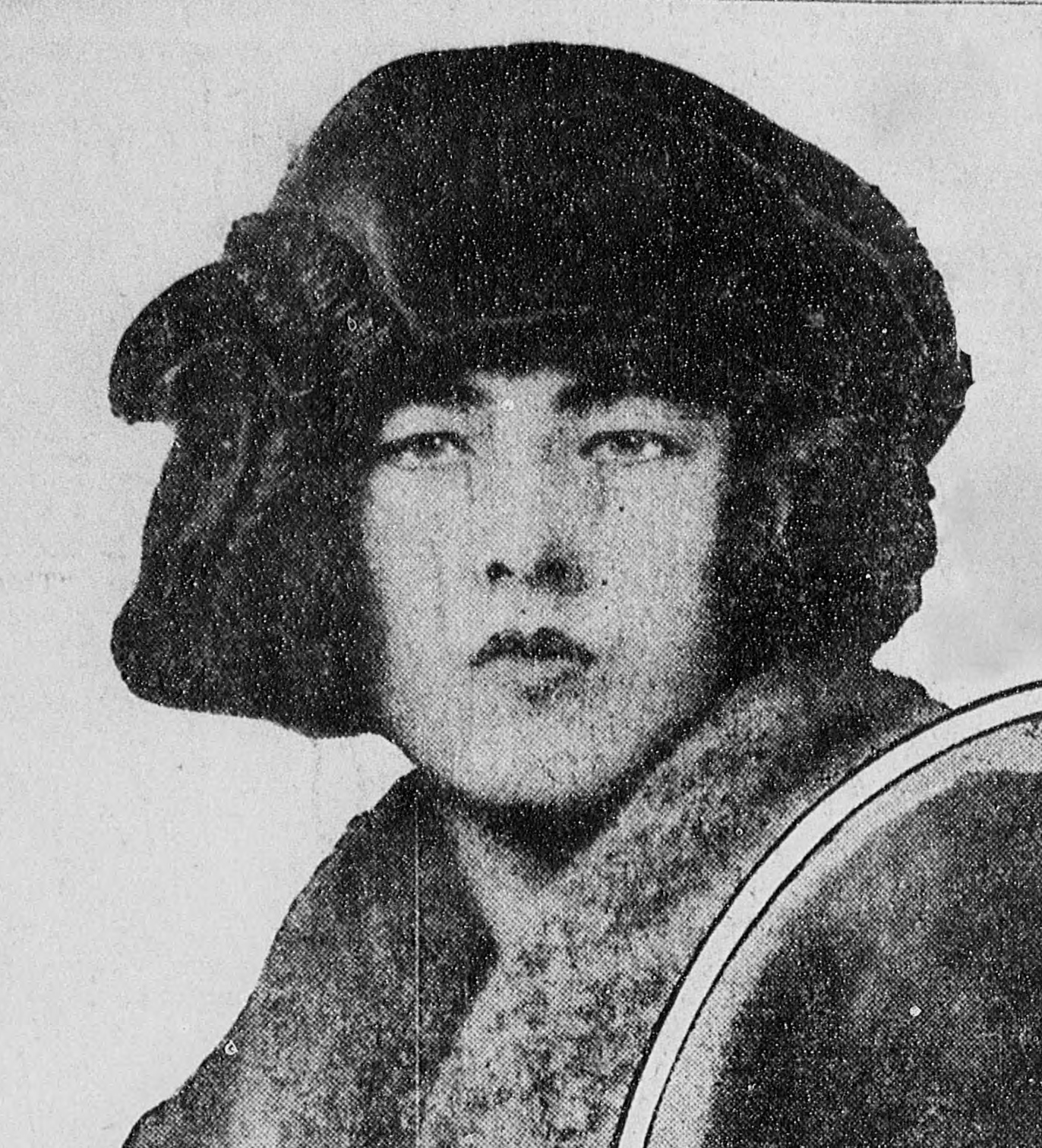
- Vanderbilt c. 1922
- Born: January 23, 1904; New York City, U.S.
- Died: January 25, 1944 (aged 40); Havana, Cuba
- Spouses: Henry Cooke Cushing III (m. 1923; div. 1932) Lawrence Wise Lowman (m. 1932; div. 1940) Antonio Martin Arostegui (m. 1940)
- Children: 1
- Parent(s): Reginald Claypoole Vanderbilt; Cathleen Neilson
- Family: Vanderbilt family

Cathleen Vanderbilt Arostegui (January 23, 1904 – January 25, 1944) was an American heiress and member of the Vanderbilt family.

== Early life ==
Cathleen was born on January 23, 1904, in Manhattan, New York City. She was the only child of Reginald Claypoole Vanderbilt (1880–1925) and his first wife, Cathleen (née Neilson; 1885–1927). Her father had a country home known as Sandy Point Farm in Portsmouth, Rhode Island. Before her parents' eventual divorce in 1920, they separated and she continued to live with her mother. After the divorce, her mother remarried to Sidney Jones Colford Jr. in 1921, and her father remarried to Gloria Morgan, with whom he had one more daughter, Gloria Vanderbilt.

Her maternal grandparents were Frederick Neilson and Isabelle Gebhard Neilson. Her paternal grandparents were Cornelius Vanderbilt II and Alice Claypoole Vanderbilt. Among her large family was uncle Cornelius Vanderbilt III, aunt Gertrude Vanderbilt Whitney, who married Harry Payne Whitney and founded the Whitney Museum, uncle Alfred Gwynne Vanderbilt, who died on the RMS Lusitania, and aunt Gladys Vanderbilt Széchenyi, who married Count László Széchenyi.

After her father's death in September 1925, Cathleen and her half-sister Gloria inherited the bulk of their father's estate, including a $5,000,000 trust established by Reginald's father, Cornelius II, in 1899.

== Personal life ==
In 1923, Cathleen was married to Henry "Harry" Cooke Cushing III (1895–1960) in the Italian Gardens of the Ambassador Hotel. Harry was the son of Harry Cooke Cushing Jr. and Adelaide Blanche Cohnfeld, and the nephew of illustrator Otho Cushing. Before their divorce in 1932, (Note: Harry later remarried to Frances Sarah Peters (1904–1975) in 1937.) they lived at 26 East 96th Street and were the parents of Henry Cooke Cushing IV (1924–2000), a polo player and investor who was married to Georgia Walters "Georgette Windsor" (born 1924), Ruth Swift Dunbar (1932–2010), Rosalba Neri (born 1938), and Laura Alvarez.

In August 1932, ten days after her divorce from Cushing, she married CBS radio executive Lawrence Wise Lowman (1900–1980) at the court house in Hempstead, Long Island. After their marriage, Lowman, a son of David and Amalia Lowman, made their home in New York City. Cathleen obtained a divorce from Lowman on June 7, 1940, in the Cuban courts. (Note: Lowman later remarried to the painter Eleanor Barry (1906–1983) in 1941.)

On October 9, 1940, she married for the third and final time to Antonio Martin Arostegui (1911–1986), the publisher of PM, the only English afternoon newspaper in Havana, Cuba. He was the son of Marquesa de Justiz de Santa Ana and Arturo Arostegui.

After a two month illness, Cathleen died at the Anglo-American Hospital in the Vedado district of Havana on January 25, 1944, aged 40. She was buried in the Aurelia Castillo family vault at Colon Cemetery, Havana.
