= Mélusine Ruspoli =

Italian socialite and social media influencer

Princess Mélusine
- Born: 25 July 1994 (age 31); Paris, France
Names
- Mathilda Mélusine dei Principi Ruspoli
- House: Ruspoli
- Father: Alessandro Ruspoli, 9th Prince of Cerveteri
- Mother: Theresa Patricia Genest
- Occupation: model fashion influencer socialite actress
- Education: Lycée français Chateaubriand; Istituto Marangoni

Donna Mathilda Mélusine dei Principi Ruspoli (born 25 July 1994), also known as Princess Melusine Ruspoli, is a French-born Italian socialite, model, voice actress, and fashion influencer. She is the daughter of Alessandro Ruspoli, 9th Prince of Cerveteri and a member of House of Ruspoli. Ruspoli made her modelling debut in 2014 as one of the faces of Salvatore Ferragamo S.p.A.'s Fiamma campaign. She made her runway debut walking for Dolce & Gabbana at Milan Fashion Week in 2017.

== Family, early life, and education ==
Donna Mathilda Mélusine dei Principi Ruspoli was born in Paris on 25 July 1994 to the Italian actor and aristocrat Alessandro Ruspoli, 9th Prince of Cerveteri and the French model Theresa Patricia Genest. She is a member of the Ruspoli family, an Italian noble family that are also part of the Papal nobility and Black aristocracy. Her father, who died in 2005, was the 9th Prince of Cerveteri, the 9th Marquess of Riano, the 14th Count of Vignanello, and a Prince of the Papal States. She is the half-sister of Francesco Ruspoli, 10th Prince of Cerveteri and Tao Ruspoli.

Ruspoli spent her childhood in Paris and at the family's palace in Rome, Palazzo Ruspoli, and at the family's castle in Vignanello, Castello Ruspoli. In 2013, she was presented to society during Le Bal des Débutantes at the Hôtel Raphael. She wore a pink floral tulle gown by Chanel for the occasion.

She received her Baccalauréat at Lycée français Chateaubriand in Rome. She studied fashion business at the Istituto Marangoni in London.

== Career ==
=== Acting ===
In 2018, Ruspoli voiced Princess Jasmine in the Italian version of the American animated comedy film Ralph Breaks the Internet produced by Walt Disney Animation Studios.

In 2020, she co-wrote and starred in Grey Constraint, a short fashion film directed by Peppe Tortora for Grey Magazine. The film's plot centered on a princess locked away in a castle, an artistic depiction of Ruspoli's time in quarantine at Castello Ruspoli during the COVID-19 pandemic in Italy.

=== Fashion ===
Ruspoli is represented by the talent management company Next Management. In May 2014, Ruspoli was one of the faces of the Fiamma campaign for Salvatore Ferragamo S.p.A. Later that year, she was photographed by Stefania Paparelli for W. Along with modelling, she was an intern at the Ferragamo advertising department. In 2017, Ruspoli made her runway modelling debut walking in the Dolce & Gabbana Spring/Summer show at Milan Fashion Week. She walked again for Dolce & Gabbana in the brand's Secret Show. She has also modelled for Chanel. In 2019, she modelled in a fashion spread for the magazine Mia Le Journal. In March 2020, during the COVID-19 pandemic, fashion photographer Peppe Tortora used WhatsApp to photograph Ruspoli in quarantine at Castello Ruspoli for a spread in Grey Magazine. Later that year, she was named European It Girl of the Summer by Tatler. Also in 2020, she modelled for Fendi in a campaign spread photographed by Leonardo Veloce.

She is a fashion influencer on social media. In 2017, she had 17,000 followers on Instagram, and later gained a larger following during the pandemic.

== Personal life ==
Ruspoli is a socialite and has sat at the front row during Milan Fashion Week and Paris Fashion Week at shows for Alberta Ferretti, Fendi, and Tod's. She is considered part of the European jet set and is friends with Lady Kitty Spencer, Lady Amelia Windsor, Flora Ogilvy Vesterberg, and Chiara di Carcaci.

In 2019, she attended the Animal Ball, a charity event in London that raises funds for conservation programmes in South Asia. In 2017, she attended the launch party for Chanel's perfume Gabrielle.

Ruspoli is Catholic.

== Filmography ==
Mélusine Ruspoli's film work
Year	Title	Role	Notes
2018	Ralph Breaks the Internet	Princess Jasmine (voice)	Italian version
2020	Grey Constraint	Herself	Short film
