= Reginald Claypoole Vanderbilt =

American equestrian and scion of the Vanderbilt fortune (1880–1925)

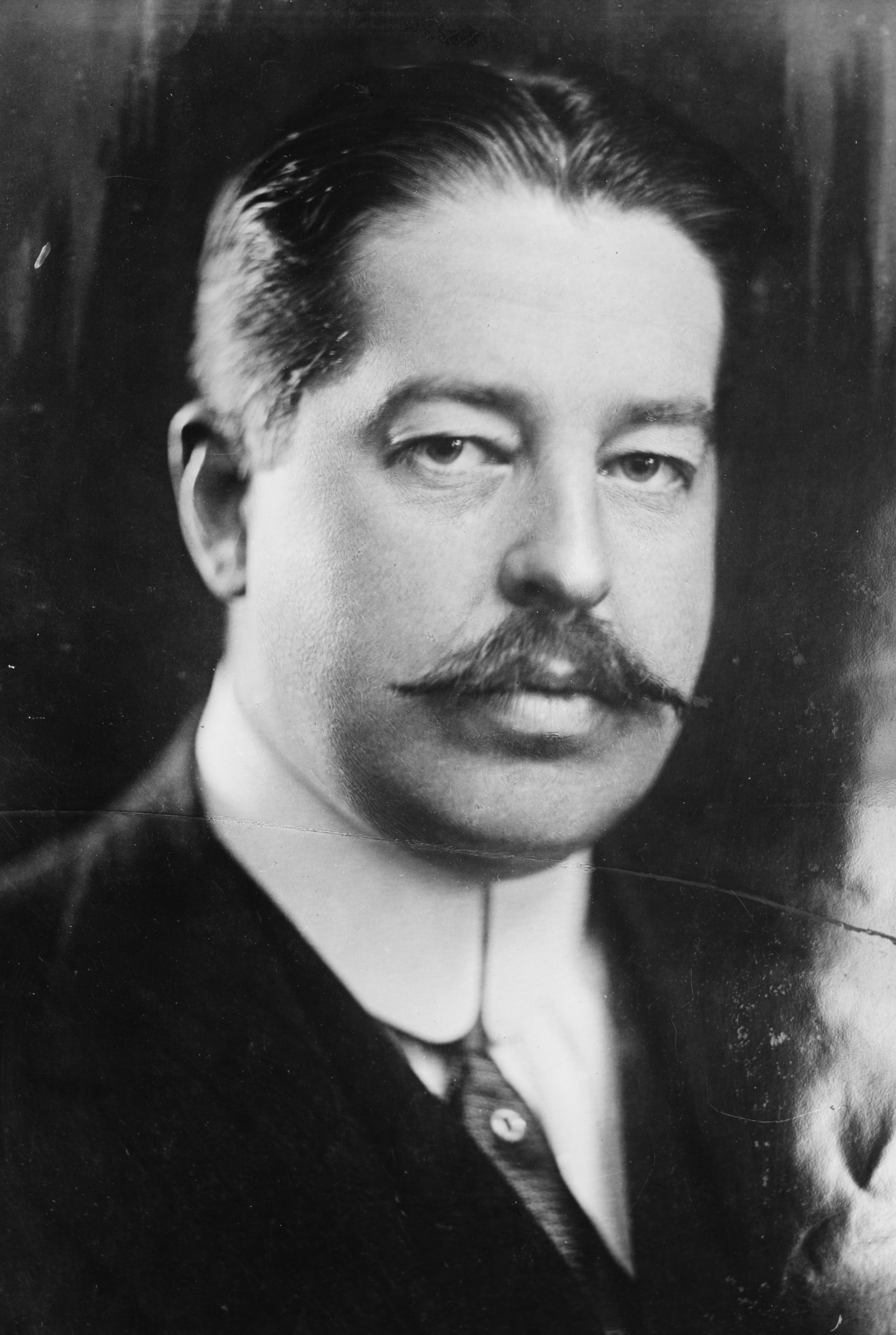
- Born: January 14, 1880; Manhattan, New York, U.S.
- Died: September 4, 1925 (aged 45); Portsmouth, Rhode Island, U.S.
- Burial place: Vanderbilt Family Cemetery and Mausoleum, Staten Island, New York, U.S.
- Education: Yale University
- Occupation: Equestrian
- Spouses: Cathleen Neilson (m. 1903; div. 1920) Gloria Morgan (m. 1923)
- Children: Cathleen Vanderbilt; Gloria Vanderbilt
- Parent(s): Cornelius Vanderbilt II; Alice Claypoole Gwynne
- Family: Vanderbilt family

Reginald Claypoole Vanderbilt (January 14, 1880 – September 4, 1925) was a member of the Vanderbilt family. He was the father of Gloria Vanderbilt and maternal grandfather of Anderson Cooper. An avid equestrian, Vanderbilt was the founder and president of many equestrian organizations. He gambled away most of his inheritance.

== Early life ==
Reginald Claypoole Vanderbilt was born on January 14, 1880, in Manhattan, New York. He was the youngest son of Cornelius Vanderbilt II and Alice Claypoole Gwynne. Through his father, Reginald was a grandson of William Henry Vanderbilt I, and great-grandson of Commodore Cornelius Vanderbilt, who was the founder of the family's extensive fortune.

He attended Yale University, but did not graduate.

== Inheritance ==
Following the death of his father's Cornelius Vanderbilt II in 1899, Reginald inherited a trust fund of $5,000,000, as well as a lump sum of $1,480,000. His interest in the trust fund was limited to the income for his lifetime, after which the Trust would devolve upon his children in shares appointed in Reginald's will, or failing this appointment, in equal shares.

The bulk of Cornerlius Vanderbilt II's $73,000,000 estate was bequeathed to Reginald's older brother Alfred G. Vanderbilt I. When Alfred died in 1915, Reginald received a bequest of $500,000 in his brother's will, although he reportedly gambled away the entirety of this amount within four years.

== Personal life ==
=== Gambling ===
Reginald's adult life was marred by a serious gambling addiction and, during his later years, chronic alcoholism. He frequented Richard Albert Canfield's illegal private gambling establishment at 5 East 44th Street on Manhattan's Upper East Side. During a police raid on Canfield's premises, officers discovered approximately $300,000 in Reginald Vanderbilt's IOU's in Canfield's safe, which Reginald's lawyers later settled for $130,000.

Reginald regularly spent the entirety of his annual trust income each year; by 1915 the value of his $5,000,000 trust fund had grown to approximately $6,500,000, from which he enjoyed a gross income of $217,000 annually.

=== Residences ===
In 1902 Reginald purchased a 113-acre country estate, Sandy Point Farm, near Portsmouth, Rhode Island; during the following years he enlarged the estate, which spanned approximlately 200 acres by the time he died.

In 1916 he purchased a large townhouse on Manhattan's Upper East Side at No. 12 East 77th Street.

== Marriages and children ==
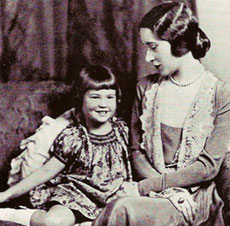
Vanderbilt's second wife, Gloria Mercedes Morgan, with his daughter, Gloria Vanderbilt

In 1903 Reginald married Cathleen Neilson at Parker Cottage in Newport, Rhode Island. Cathleen was the daughter of Frederick Neilson and heiress Isabelle Gebhard Neilson; through her mother she was connected to many of New York's "Old Money" families. Cathleen was also niece of prominent banker and socialite Frederick Gebhard, and a great-granddaughter of the wealthy New York real estate developer Thomas E. Davis. The marriage produced one child:

- Cathleen Vanderbilt (1904–1944) who married (1) Henry Cooke Cushing III in 1923, (2) Lawrence Wise Lowman in 1932, and (3) Martin Arostegui in 1940.

Cathleen eventually commenced divorce proceedings against Reggie in 1919 on the grounds of desertion. As per of her suit, Cathleen alledged that she and Reggie had effectively been separated since 1912 after a family holiday in Paris. Reggie had returned to the United States without informing Cathleen, nor leaving any funds to provide for her or their eight year old daughter; after Cathleen complained to the Vanderbilt family's agent in Paris, Reggie made arrangements for the return passage of his wife, daughter, and their daughter's nanny from Paris, but neglected to arrange for someone to collect them upon their arrival in New York. Reggie did not dispute Cathleen's suit, and the divorce was finalised in 1920..

On March 6, 1923, and after a short courtship, Reginald was married for a second time to Gloria Mercedes Morgan. At the time of the marriage, Reggie was aged 43, whilst his new bride was only 17. During their short marriage, they had one child:

- Gloria Laura Vanderbilt (1924–2019) who later became a noted fashion designer.

Despite the couple's substantial age difference, Reginald's mother Alice Claypoole Vanderbilt reportedly was very fond of her young daughter-in-law. Following the couple's engagement, during a dinner where both Alice and Gloria were present, the former noticed that Gloria was not wearing pearls; when she asked her son why his wife was not wearing any pearls, Reggie admitted that he could not afford to buy her a pearl necklace of such a quality which would be appropriate for a female member of the Vanderbilt family. Alice informed her son that "Vanderbilt women were expected to have pearls", requested that a waiter provide a pair of scissors, and proceeded to cut off one-third of her own $200,000 pearl necklace, which she then handed to Gloria.

=== Descendants ===
Through his eldest daughter, Vanderbilt was the grandfather of Henry Cooke Cushing IV (1924–2000), who was married to Georgia Walters "Georgette Windsor" (b. 1924), Ruth Swift Dunbar (1932–2010), Rosalba Neri (b. 1939), and Laura Alvarez.

Through his daughter Gloria, he is the maternal grandfather of Leopold Stanislaus Stokowski (b. 1950), who married Ivy Strick and Emily Goldstein (b 1964), Christopher Stokowski (b. 1952), Carter Vanderbilt Cooper (1965–1988), and Anderson Hays Cooper (b. 1967), the television news anchor.

== Death and estate ==
On 4 September 1925 Reginald died suddenly at his country home, Sandy Point Farm. He had suffered a series of violent internal haemorrhages, which were attributed to the cirrhosis he had developed from long-term alcoholism. His mother Alice was at his bedside when he died; however, despite rushing to be at his side, his wife Gloria arrived approximately three minutes after his death.

He was buried in the Vanderbilt Family Cemetery and Mausoleum in Staten Island, New York.

=== Estate ===
Reginald's personal estate, which included his New York townhouse at 12 East 77th Street and the Sandy Point Farm estate, was initially valued at $1,125,000. In his will he bequeathed the entirety of his personal estate to his second wife Gloria; however, after the payment of all outstanding debts and taxes, virtually no liquid assets remainded. In order to meet outstanding debts, the Probate Court of Newport County, Rhode Island ordered that Reggie's country estate, Sandy Point Farm, be sold. The sale was finalised in 1926, and Reggie's widow Gloria received approximately $45,000 from the $100,000 sale proceeds, and well as $30,000 from a later sale of the house's contents.

The Reginald C. Vanderbilt House at No 12 East 77th Street in Manhattan was valued at $200,000 for probate; his executors sold the property in May 1927.

The bulk of Reginald's wealth was held in the $5,000,000 trust fund he had received under the terms of his father's will. Reggie's creditors were unable to claim any funds held in this trust, as Reginald's right to the trust was limited to a life-interest in the trust income. Following his death, the trust was split between his two daughters Cathleen and Gloria.
