= Alessandro Ruspoli, 7th Prince of Cerveteri =

Prince of Cerveteri (1869–1952)

Alessandro Ruspoli
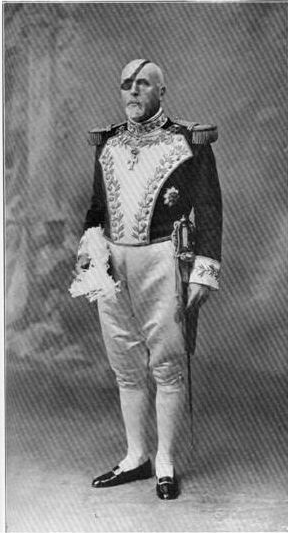

7th Prince of Cerveteri
- Tenure: 1907–1952
- Predecessor: Prince Francesco Ruspoli
- Successor: Prince Francesco Ruspoli
- Born: January 4, 1869; Rome, Papal States
- Died: September 28, 1952 (aged 83); Rome, Italy
- Spouse: Duchess Marianita Lante Montefeltro della Rovere (m. 1897)
- Issue: Princess Giacinta Ruspoli; Prince Francesco Ruspoli; Princess Egle Ruspoli; Prince Luigi Ruspoli
- House: Ruspoli
- Father: Prince Francesco Ruspoli
- Mother: Countess Egle Franchesi

Alessandro, Principe Ruspoli (January 14, 1869 – September 28, 1952), Grand Master of the Sacred Apostolic Hospice, was the 7th Principe di Cerveteri, 7th Marchese di Riano, 12th Conte di Vignanello and Prince of the Holy Roman Empire, son of Francesco Maria Ruspoli, 6th Prince of Cerveteri and wife Egle dei Conti Franchesi.

== Marriage and children ==
He married in Rome, July 5, 1897 Marianita dei Duchi Lante Montefeltro della Rovere (Rome, May 30, 1873 – Rome, February 22, 1971), granddaughter of wealthy Americans, Ann and Thomas E. Davis from New York City, New York, by whom he had four children:

- Donna Giacinta dei Principi Ruspoli (Rome, April 11, 1898 – Rome, September 4, 1982), married firstly in Rome, April 30, 1919 Clemente dei Principi del Drago Marchese di Rioffredo (Rome, September 9, 1897 – Rome, March 7, 1939), and had issue, and secondly in Rome, November 4, 1941 Conte Alvise Emo-Capodilista (Vicenza, July 17, 1898 – Rome, January 7, 1980), without issue
- Francesco Ruspoli, 8th Prince of Cerveteri
- Donna Egle dei Principi Ruspoli (Rome, April 21, 1902 – Rome, July 3, 2000), married in Rome, April 28, 1924 Alessandro Federici, Marchese della Costa (Chieri, August 5, 1899 – Rome, March 16, 1989), and had issue
- Don Luigi dei Principi Ruspoli (Rome, March 14, 1908 –), married in Rome, April 23, 1938 Eleonora Berlingieri dei Marchesi di Valle Perrotta (Rome, August 25, 1913 – Rome, October, 1989), and had two sons:
  - Don Giulio dei Principi Ruspoli (Rome, September 23, 1939 –), married firstly in Rome, June 2, 1974 Paola Murri, without issue, and secondly Patrizia Memmo, without issue
  - Don Pietro dei Principi Ruspoli (Rome, October 27, 1940 –), married at Cerveteri, October 3, 1970 Letizia Ciancarelli, and had a daughter and a son:
    - Donna Marianita dei Principi Ruspoli (1976/1977 –), married at the Villa Papale della Suvera, near Siena, September 23, 2006 Luca Pirri Ardizzone (Milan, April 18, 1973 –)
    - Don Alessandro dei Principi Ruspoli (1980); married 20 June 2015 Guja Randaccio dei conti del Timavo

== See also ==
- Ruspoli

Italian nobility
Preceded by Francesco Maria Ruspoli, 6th Prince of Cerveteri	Prince of Cerveteri; 1907–1952	Succeeded by Francesco Ruspoli, 8th Prince of Cerveteri
