= Auguste Pierre Chouteau =

American businessman (1786–1838)

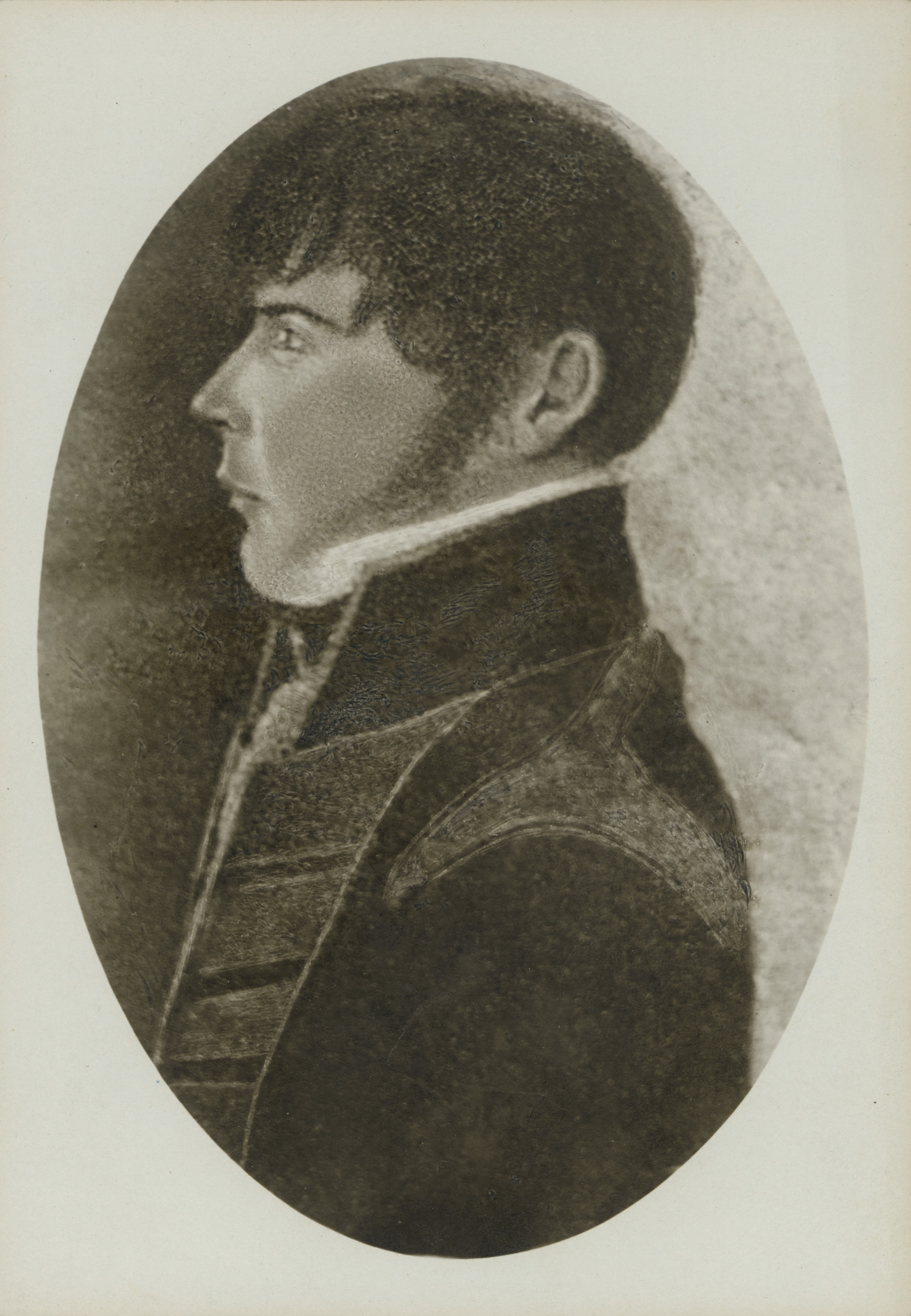
- Born: 9 May 1786; St. Louis (Spanish Empire)
- Died: 25 December 1838 (aged 52); Fort Gibson (United States)
- Resting place: Fort Gibson National Cemetery
- Alma mater: United States Military Academy
- Parent(s): Jean-Pierre Chouteau
- Relatives: Pierre Chouteau Jr.

Auguste Pierre Chouteau (9 May 1786 – 25 December 1838) was a member of the Chouteau fur-trading family who established trading posts in what is now the U.S. state of Oklahoma.

Chouteau was born in St. Louis, then part of Spanish colonial Upper Louisiana. His father was Jean Pierre Chouteau, one of the first settlers in St. Louis. His mother was Pelagie Kiersereau (1767-1793). One of his brothers was Pierre Chouteau Jr. (who founded Fort Pierre in South Dakota). A half-brother (born after his father married Brigitte Saucier) was François Chouteau, who established a trading post and was one of the first settlers of Kansas City, Missouri.

Auguste Chouteau was among the first young men from Missouri to be appointed to West Point by Thomas Jefferson. After graduating in 1806, he resigned the Army in 1807. He entered the family fur trading business, but he later served as captain of the territorial militia during the War of 1812.

After the war, Chouteau was arrested in 1817 by the Spanish during a trading expedition on the upper Arkansas River, as they considered that area under their control and excluded others from its lucrative trading. He was imprisoned in Santa Fe, New Mexico.

After being released, Chouteau continued the family trade among the Osage. He established his home in present-day Salina, Oklahoma, part of the western extent of their territory. In 1832, Washington Irving visited the post and described it in Tour of the Prairies.

Chouteau had children by at least four women who were at least partly Osage, fathering at least seven children by these women. He also married Sophie Labbadie, a cousin of French descent, whom he kept in St. Louis while he kept the other women on the frontier. He had at least nine children with his wife Sophie Chouteau.

The two other women he was most closely associated with were Rosalie Lambert, who he had two children by, and her sister Masina Lambert, with whom he had three children. The Lamberts' mother was Osage and their father was Metis. Rosalie was born in 1809, was living with Chouteau by 1825, and she continued to live with him until his death at Fort Gibson, Indian Territory, in 1838.

== Legacy and honors ==
- Chouteau, Oklahoma, is named for him.
