= Thomas E. Davis =

American real estate developer (d. 1878)

- Born: Thomas Edward Davis c. 1785 or 1795 (Note: Note that 1850 New York census indicates Davis was born 1785, however 1860 census conflicts and indicates Davis was born in 1795.); England
- Died: March 16, 1878 (age 83 or 93); Florence, Italy
- Occupation: Real estate developer
- Spouse: Anne Power
- Children: 8
- Relatives: Frederick Gebhard (grandson); Isabelle Gebhard Neilson (granddaughter); Harry La Montagne (grandson); John F. A. Sanford (son-in-law)

Thomas Edward Davis or Davies (c. 1785 or 1795 – March 16, 1878) was a prolific real estate developer who built residential properties in New York between 1830 and 1860.

== Early life ==
Davis emigrated from England to New Brunswick, New Jersey, early in the 19th century, with the intention of setting up a whiskey distilling business. When the distillery failed, he moved to New York City in 1830.

== Property development ==
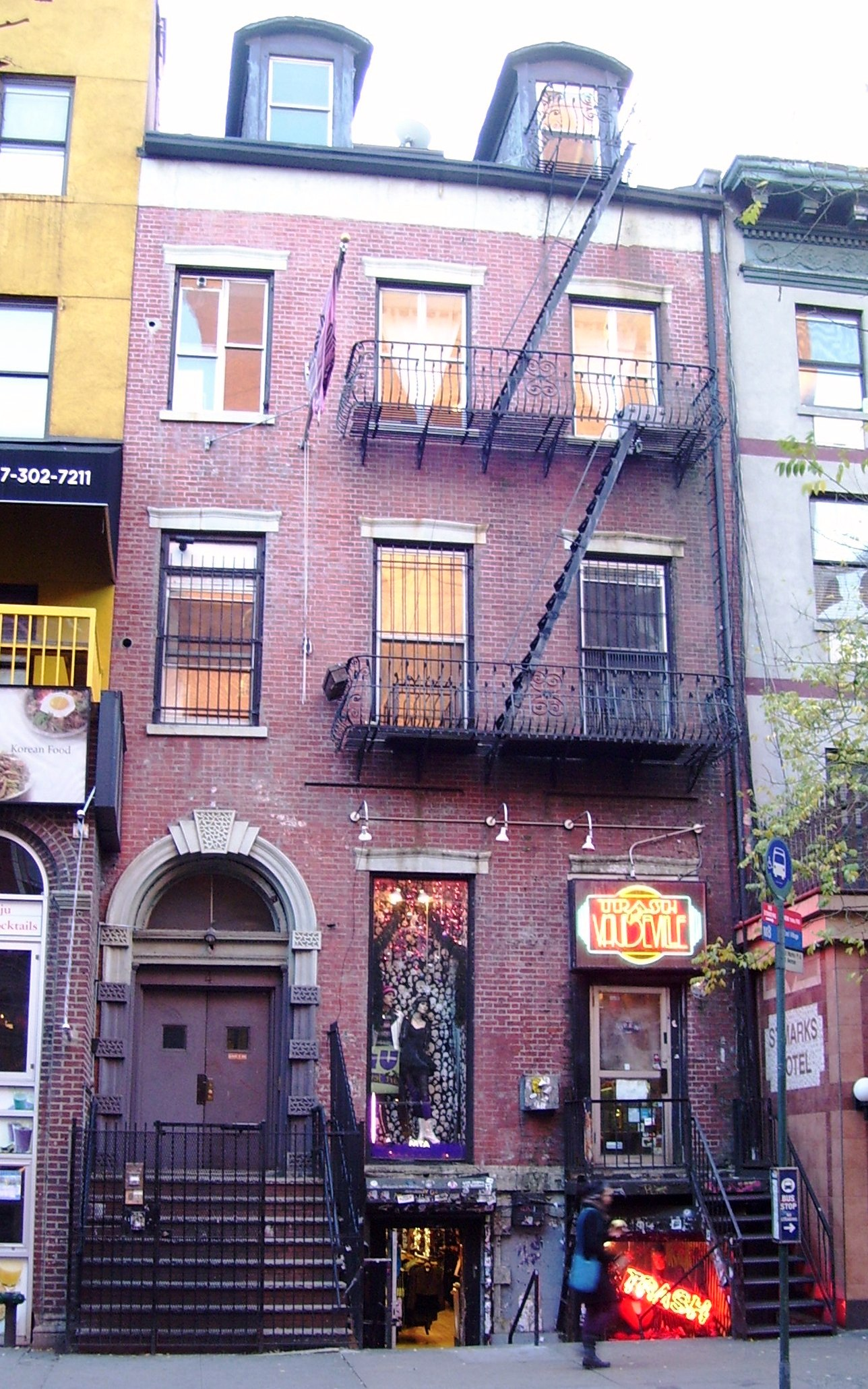
Hamilton-Holly House; developer: Thomas E. Davis

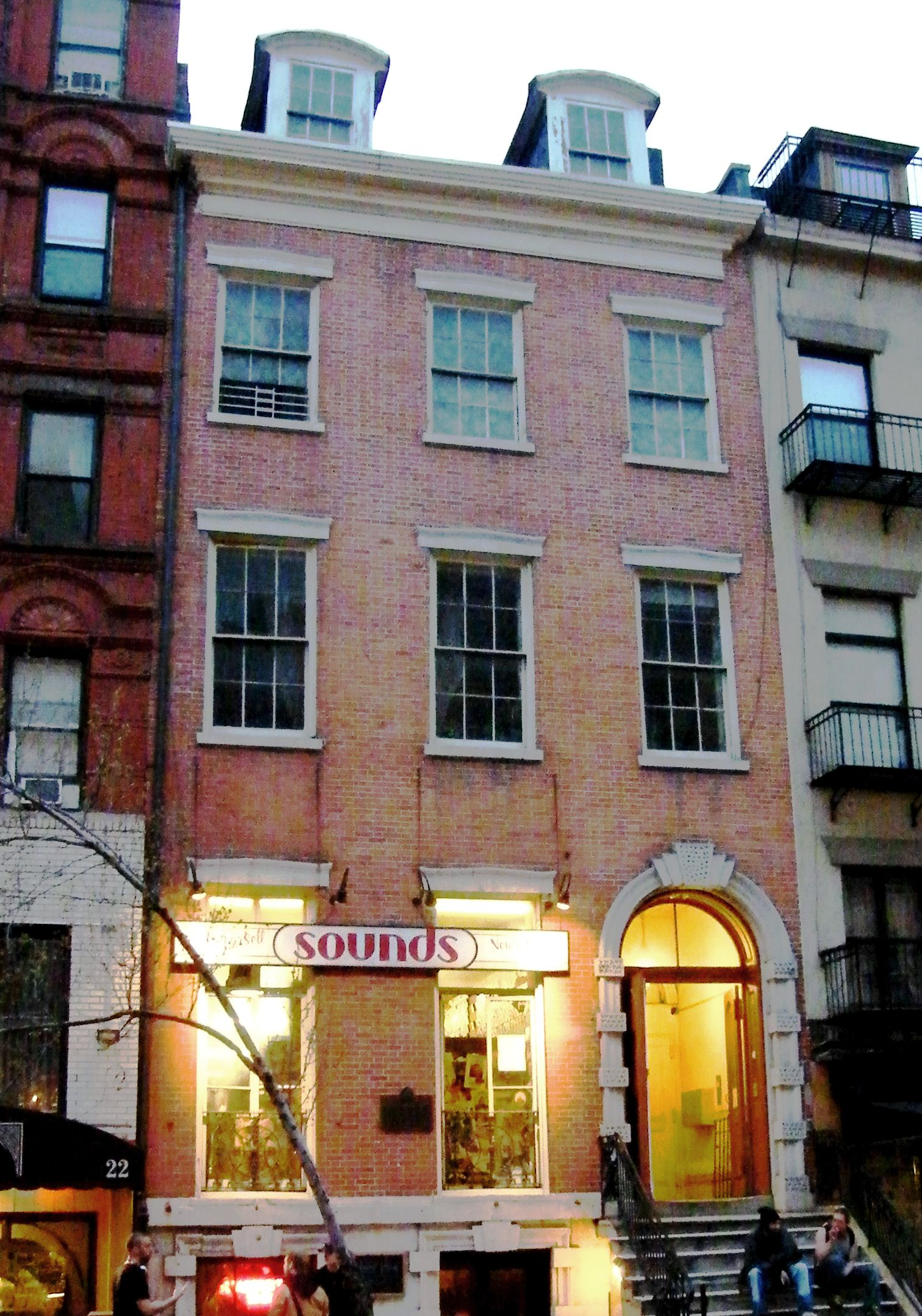
Daniel LeRoy House; developer: Thomas E. Davis

=== Manhattan ===
Davis began his career in property speculation in New York with financial backing from the banking house of J.L. & S. Joseph & Co. The Joseph were a major firm of securities brokers and had the agency for the Rothschilds but became overextended and was a casualty of the crash of 1837.

In 1831, Davis built Federal style townhouses in red brick on both sides of East 8th Street, between Third & Second Avenues, developing the entire block known as St. Mark's Place. The townhouses originally stood "virtually alone in the meadows and marshland of the Stuyvesant family's farm", heightening "the grandeur of these two rows". There remain three surviving townhouses from this development: the Hamilton-Holly House at 4 St. Mark's Place, the building at 25 St. Mark's Place, and the best preserved of the three, the Daniel LeRoy House at 20 St. Mark's Place.

Further developments by Davis in the area include Carroll Place, on the block from Thompson Place to LaGuardia Place.

Toward the end of the recession that followed the Panic of 1837, which lasted until the mid-1840s, Davis was able to purchase 400 plots on Fifth Avenue (north of Twentieth Street) for a few hundred dollars each and built a complete block of fine dwellings between East 31st and East 32nd Street.

=== Staten Island ===
Between 1834 and 1835, Davis bought land on Staten Island that ran from the quarantine station to Sailors' Snug Harbor, or nearly the whole of northern Staten Island. He called the area New Brighton (after a coastal resort in England), and built Greek revival style houses on the shoreline. An association of wealthy entrepreneurs was set up to further develop the land and promote the area as a suburb, with easy access to New York via steam ferries. However, almost immediately, the financial crisis known as the Panic of 1837 resulted in foreclosure of the association.

Davis, with co-partners, re-acquired the development and managed to ride out the recession. Davis lost a substantial amount of money during this period but survived the crash, while the bankers who had initially provided support for Davis, J.L. & S. Joseph, failed.

=== Minnesota ===
Davis and two of his sons-in-law, Frederick C. Gebhard and John F. A. Sanford, became involved with financing the St. Anthony Falls Water Power Company in Minneapolis. Sanford, who had been a frontiersman, was acquainted with the men developing the project and they invited him to invest. He in turn brought in Davis and Gebhard. The relationship between the developers and the New York backers was not good, and finally broke down following the death of Sanford in 1857. Gebhard died in 1865, his brother William H. Gebhard became involved, court action followed, and it took several years for the situation to be finally resolved.

=== Later life ===
Davis became extremely wealthy, and was considered the greatest real estate speculator of his time. Among New York City real estate owners, c. 1862, Davis's holdings were placed third after John Jacob Astor and department store mogul Alexander Turney Stewart. In the mid 1860s, Davis moved with his family to Italy.

== Personal life ==
Davis's wife was Anne Power, who had been born in Ireland in October 1799. Her brother was John Power, Vicar General of New York and pastor of St. Peter's on Barclay Street in Lower Manhattan. Another brother was Irish politician Maurice Power, who married the daughter of Judge Henry Brockholst Livingston. Together, Thomas and Anne Davis had eight children who survived to adulthood, one son and seven daughters:

- Thomas Edward Davis Jr. (d. 1916), who married Marianita Jove (d. 1870), daughter of Lorenzo Jove. Davis Jr. was a friend of the Irish writer and poet Fitz James O'Brien, and was involved in trying to raise a regiment with him during the American Civil War, called the McClellan Rifles. When O'Brien was killed, Davis Jr. brought his remains back from Baltimore for burial in New York and acted as one of his executors. Davis Jr. was in poor health and eventually moved to Europe where he died in Bournemouth, England, in 1916. His daughter, Marianita, remained his companion until his death.
- Catherine "Kate" Davis (1829−1870), who married Frederick Charles Gebhard (1825−1865). Of the Davis children, they were the only couple to remain in the United States. (Note: Kate Davis Gebhard's two children were: playboy Frederick Gebhard, who had a relationship with actress Lillie Langtry for about ten years, and Isabelle Gebhard, who married Frederick Neilson (their daughter Cathleen Neilson married Reginald Claypoole Vanderbilt).)
- Isabel Davis (1832−1898), who married John Francis Alexander Sanford (1806–1857), a widower twenty-five years older than herself. She moved to Paris after his death. (Note: Isabel Davis Sanford's two children were: Emilie Sanford (1852−1932), who married French diplomat Count Maurice Sala, and John Francis Sanford (1853−1912).)
- Anna Davis (c. 1833–1925), who married Auguste La Montagne (c. 1840−1894). (Note: Anna Davis La Montagne's daughter Kate La Montagne married Nicholas Murray Butler (the 12th President of Columbia University) and her son Harry La Montagne (1869–1959) was a recipient of the Legion of Honour, a horse owner and artist.)
- Mathilde "Tilly" Davis (1841−1917), who married Don Antonio Lante Montefeltro della Rovere, 3rd Duke Lante della Rovere, Prince of Cantalupo (1831−1897) on 28 April 1866. (Note: Mathilde's daughter, Marianita dei Duchi Lante Montefeltro della Rovere (1873–1971), married Alessandro Ruspoli, 7th Prince of Cerveteri, in 1897; he was an official of the Pontifical Household.)
- Eliza "Lizzie" Davis (1844-1923), who married Marquis Angelo Gavotti Verospi (1835−1916) on 10 October 1861.
- Nora Davis (1846−1913), who married Charles-Joseph Blanc de Lanautte, comte d'Hauterive (b. 1848) on 15 October 1873.
- Marie Davis (1850−1932), who married Anatole Eugène Alexis Taffin d'Heursel, comte d'Heursel (1840-1896) on 28 October 1868; she left him for Henry Louis Eugène Marie Say (1850–1899) of the French sugar manufacturing family in about 1878, they married on 20 May 1882. Unable to obtain a divorce, she took Swiss naturalization and married Say on May 20, 1882 in Switzerland. After his death in 1899, his will was contested by his sister, Jeanne-Marie Say, Vicomtesse de Trédern, on the grounds of his children's legitimization.

He died in Florence on March 16, 1878, at the age of 93. His body was returned to America, where he was buried at Saint Patrick's Old Cathedral Churchyard in Manhattan.
