= John F. A. Sanford =

American merchant, defendant in Dred Scott v. Sandford

John Francis Alexander Sanford (1806–1857) was a frontiersman of the American west who worked with Native American tribes as an Indian agent. He later joined Pierre Chouteau Jr. in a fur trapping and trading business. He extended his interests into other areas of commerce and became very wealthy. In the final years of his life he was involved with the landmark court case of Dred Scott v. Sandford [sic], which is perhaps what he is best known for today. He suffered mental illness and died in an asylum.

== Biography ==
Sanford's parents were Francis Alexander Sanford and Mary Adams. (Note: John Sanford Barnes, in his autobiography, indicates that his grandmother's name was Charlotte Adam, not Mary) His step mother, from his father's later marriage, was also named Mary. Before about 1810 they lived in Westmoreland County, Virginia and after this date up to 1829 their home was in Winchester, Virginia. (Note: John F. A. Sanford and his sister Charlotte (b.1808) were born in Westmoreland. Henrietta (b.1811) and the later siblings were born in Winchester. In her biography of Sanford, Janet Lecompte, says she failed to turn up records of the family in Winchester before 1810.) John F. A. Sanford, the eldest child of seven, attended the academy at West Point, and in 1825 became a clerk and interpreter in the St Louis office of Indian Affairs under William Clark. In 1826 he was appointed as a sub-agent in the remote Mandan villages of the upper Missouri. He replaced the former agent, 29-year-old Peter Wilson, who had died earlier that year after being taken ill in a Mandan settlement.

For a period of about seven years Sanford worked with several tribes including Minitarees, Crows, Arikaras, Assiniboines, Knisteneaux and Yanctonais Sioux, estimating that the population in his area was in the order of 75,000. Sanford tried to resolve underfunding issues and made requests for better pay and for an improvement in his situation. These were ignored and to further add to his frustration, he was criticised in the House of Representatives for the expenses incurred when he took a delegation of tribesmen to Washington. This both damaged his career prospects, and came as a personal blow.

In 1832 Sanford struck up a friendship with Pierre Chouteau Jr., a member of the wealthy St Louis fur trading family, and was offered a position in Chouteau's business. He joined in 1833, later becoming a partner and then the company’s representative in Washington and New York. Sanford also married Chouteau’s daughter, Emilie, although she died in 1836. Their only child, Benjamin, was raised by the Chouteau family. At this time Sanford purchased a farm in St Louis for his father, who lived there until his death in 1848.

Sanford became wealthy; his business interests included mining, railroads and mercantile. In 1851 he became one of the founder members of a company that was formed to build the Illinois Central Railroad. In 1850 he married Isabel Davis, daughter of Thomas E. Davis, New York real estate developer. Sanford with his father-in-law Davis, and brother-in-law, Frederick C. Gebhard, invested in various joint ventures including the St Anthony Falls Water Power Company, Allentown Railroad Company and the Dauphin and Susquehanna Coal Company.

In 1853 Sanford became involved with a landmark court case: Dred Scott, a slave working for Sanford's brother-in-law, had been seeking his freedom through the courts since 1846. In 1853 Scott's case went to the Supreme Court with Sanford named as the defendant; the Court ruled in Sanford's favor.

Sanford suffered mental illness during 1857 and was admitted to an asylum. At one point he was thought to be recovering, but had a relapse and died on 6 May 1857 in Manhattan.

== Family ==
In about 1829 Sanford's father moved his family to Fort McHenry, Maryland, to take up the post of an army sutler. As a consequence, 4 of Sanford's sisters met and married military men: Charlotte married General James Barnes, Henrietta married Major John B. Clark, Mary married Colonel Henry Bainbridge and Irene married army surgeon Dr John Emerson. The 5th sister, Virginia, who was the youngest, married stove manufacturer Samuel H. Ransom of Albany. Sanford’s brother, naval captain Joseph P. Sanford, married Ransom's sister Lydia, and between tours of service, worked for stove manufacturer Rathbone in Albany. (Note: Joseph's father Alexander had also been involved with a foundry business during his time in Winchester)

Sanford's second wife, Isabel, moved to Paris, France in the 1860s with the 2 children from their marriage - Emily and John Francis. Emily married French diplomat Count Maurice Sala. Their son, Count Antoine Sala, married Laura Bache Kayser, daughter of Julius Kayser, silk glove and hosiery manufacturer.

By coincidence, Isabel's uncle, Rev. John Power, Vicar General of New York, had baptized Sanford's son, Benjamin Chouteau Sanford, many years previously in New York, on 12 February 1837. The sponsors were Robert Anderson, Charles Chouteau, Julia Chouteau and Mary Bainbridge.
