= Gloria Vanderbilt =

American artist, author, actress, and designer (1924–2019)

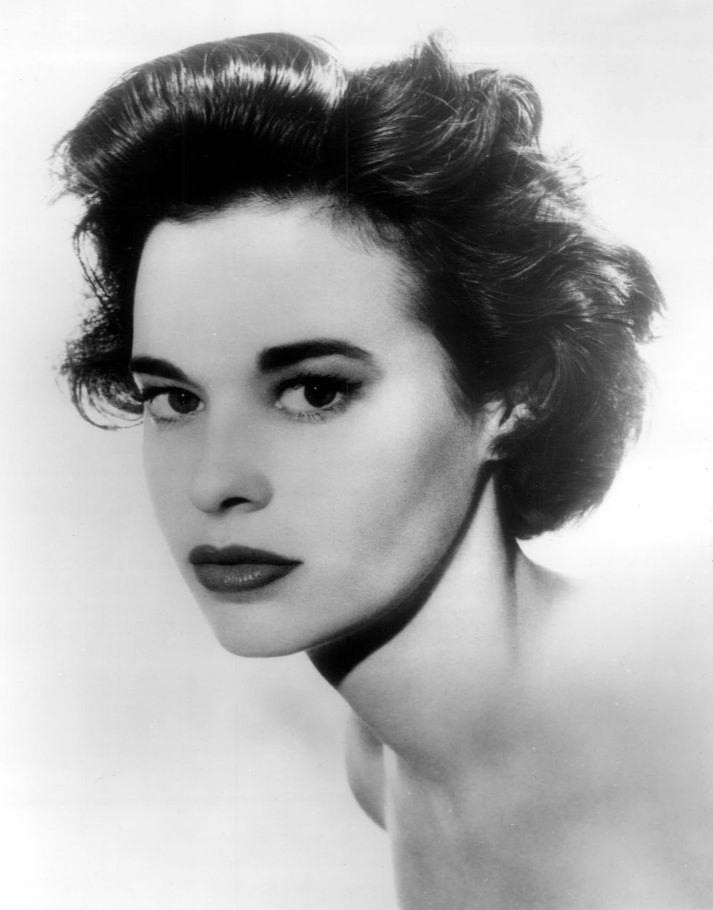
- Vanderbilt in 1959
- Born: Gloria Laura Vanderbilt; February 20, 1924; New York City, U.S.
- Died: June 17, 2019 (aged 95); New York City, U.S.
- Occupations: Artist; actress; fashion designer; socialite
- Spouses: Pat DiCicco (m. 1941; div. 1945) Leopold Stokowski (m. 1945; div. 1955) Sidney Lumet (m. 1956; div. 1963) Wyatt Emory Cooper (m. 1963; died 1978)
- Children: 4, including Anderson Cooper
- Parents: Reginald Claypoole Vanderbilt; Gloria Morgan Vanderbilt
- Family: Vanderbilt family

Gloria Laura Vanderbilt (February 20, 1924 – June 17, 2019) was an American artist, author, actress, fashion designer, heiress, and socialite.

In 1934, she was the subject of a high-profile child custody trial in which her mother Gloria Morgan Vanderbilt, and her paternal aunt, Gertrude Vanderbilt Whitney, each sought custody of her and control over her trust fund. Dubbed the "trial of the century", the seven-week court proceedings were the subject of wide and sensational media coverage, due to the wealth and prominence of the involved parties and the scandalous evidence presented to support the "oppressive" aunt's claim that the "neglectful" mother was an unfit parent to the 10-year-old, who became known as the "poor little rich girl."

In the 1970s, Vanderbilt launched a line of fashions, perfumes, and household goods bearing her name. She was particularly noted as an early developer of designer blue jeans.

== Early life and family ==
Vanderbilt was born on February 20, 1924, in Manhattan, New York City, the only child of railroad heir Reginald Claypoole Vanderbilt of the Vanderbilt family and his second wife, Gloria Morgan Vanderbilt. When Vanderbilt was born, her father was heard to exclaim in delight, "It is fantastic how Vanderbilt she looks! See the corners of her eyes, how they turn up?" She was baptized in the Episcopal Church by Bishop Herbert Shipman as Gloria Laura Vanderbilt. After her father's death, she was confirmed and raised in the Catholic Church, to which her mother belonged, and spent much of her early childhood in Paris until the age of seven. From her father's first marriage to Cathleen Neilson, she had one elder half-sister, Cathleen Vanderbilt.

Vanderbilt attended the Greenvale School on Long Island; Miss Porter's School in Farmington, Connecticut; and then the Wheeler School in Providence, Rhode Island, as well as the Art Students League in New York City, developing the artistic talent for which she would become increasingly known during her career. When Vanderbilt came of age and took control of her trust fund, she cut her mother off entirely, though they later were reconciled before her mother's death in Los Angeles, in 1965.

== Custody battle ==
Upon their father's death from cirrhosis, when Vanderbilt was 18 months old, she and her half-sister became heiresses to a half share each in a $5 million trust fund, equivalent to $92 million in 2025 value. The control of Vanderbilt's share, while she was a minor, belonged to her mother, who, for years, traveled to and from Paris, taking her daughter with her. They were accompanied by a beloved nanny—Emma Sullivan Kieslich, whom young Gloria had named "Dodo"—who would play a tumultuous part in the child's life, and her mother's identical twin sister, Thelma, who was the lover of the Prince of Wales (later Edward VIII), during this time. As a result of her spending habits, her mother's use of finances was scrutinized by the child's paternal aunt, Gertrude Vanderbilt Whitney. A sculptor and philanthropist, Whitney wanted custody of her niece, which resulted in a custody trial.

The trial was so scandalous that at times, the judge would make everyone leave the room, so as to listen to what young Vanderbilt had to say without anyone influencing her. Some people heard weeping and wailing from inside the courtroom. Testimony was heard depicting Vanderbilt's mother as an unfit parent, including an allegation from Marie Caillot, her discharged French maid, of an affair with the Marchioness of Milford Haven, a relative of the British royal family, which Lady Milford Haven would subsequently deny in her own testimony. Vanderbilt's mother lost the battle, and Vanderbilt became the ward of her aunt Gertrude.

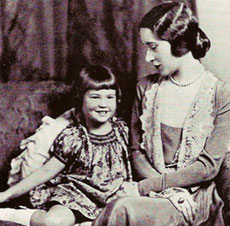
Vanderbilt at age four with her mother in 1928.

Litigation continued, however. Vanderbilt's mother was forced to live on a drastically reduced portion of her daughter's trust, which was worth more than $4 million, at the end of 1937, equivalent to $90 million in 2025 value. Visitation was also closely watched, to ensure that Vanderbilt's mother did not exert any undue influence upon her daughter with her supposedly "raucous" lifestyle. Vanderbilt was raised amidst luxury at her aunt Gertrude's mansion in Old Westbury, Long Island, surrounded by cousins her age who lived in houses circling the vast estate and in New York City.

The story of the trial was told in the 1980 Barbara Goldsmith book, Little Gloria... Happy at Last, and a 1982 NBC miniseries of the same name based on it, which was nominated for six Emmy Awards and a Golden Globe Award. Actress Jennifer Dundas played Gloria.

== Career ==
=== Theater arts ===
From 1954 to 1963, Vanderbilt applied herself to acting. She studied acting at the Neighborhood Playhouse, with teacher Sanford Meisner, and debuted in 1954, in The Swan, staged at Pocono Playhouse in Mountainhome, Pennsylvania. In 1955, she appeared on Broadway, as Elsie, in a revival of William Saroyan's The Time of Your Life. Vanderbilt also appeared in a number of live and filmed television dramas, including Playhouse 90, Studio One in Hollywood, and The Dick Powell Show. She made an appearance in a two-part episode of The Love Boat, in 1981. Other TV programs on which she appeared include Person to Person, with Edward R. Murrow, The Tonight Show Starring Johnny Carson, The Oprah Winfrey Show, Live! with Kelly and Michael and CBS News Sunday Morning.

=== Fashion ===
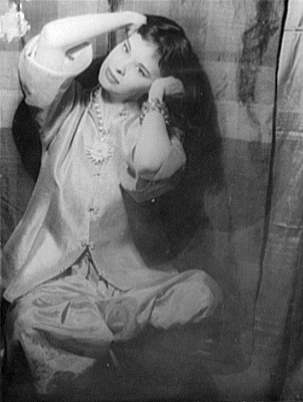
Gloria Vanderbilt 1958, photographed by Carl Van Vechten, March 3, 1955.

Vanderbilt began her career as a fashion model when she was 15 years old, appearing in Harper's Bazaar.

During the 1970s, Vanderbilt ventured into the fashion business itself, first with Glentex, licensing her name and a collection of her paintings for a line of scarves. In 1976, Indian designer Mohan Murjani's Murjani Corporation proposed launching a line of designer jeans carrying Vanderbilt's signature embroidered on the back pocket, as well as her swan logo. Her jeans were more tightly fitted than other jeans of that time and were an immediate success with customers.

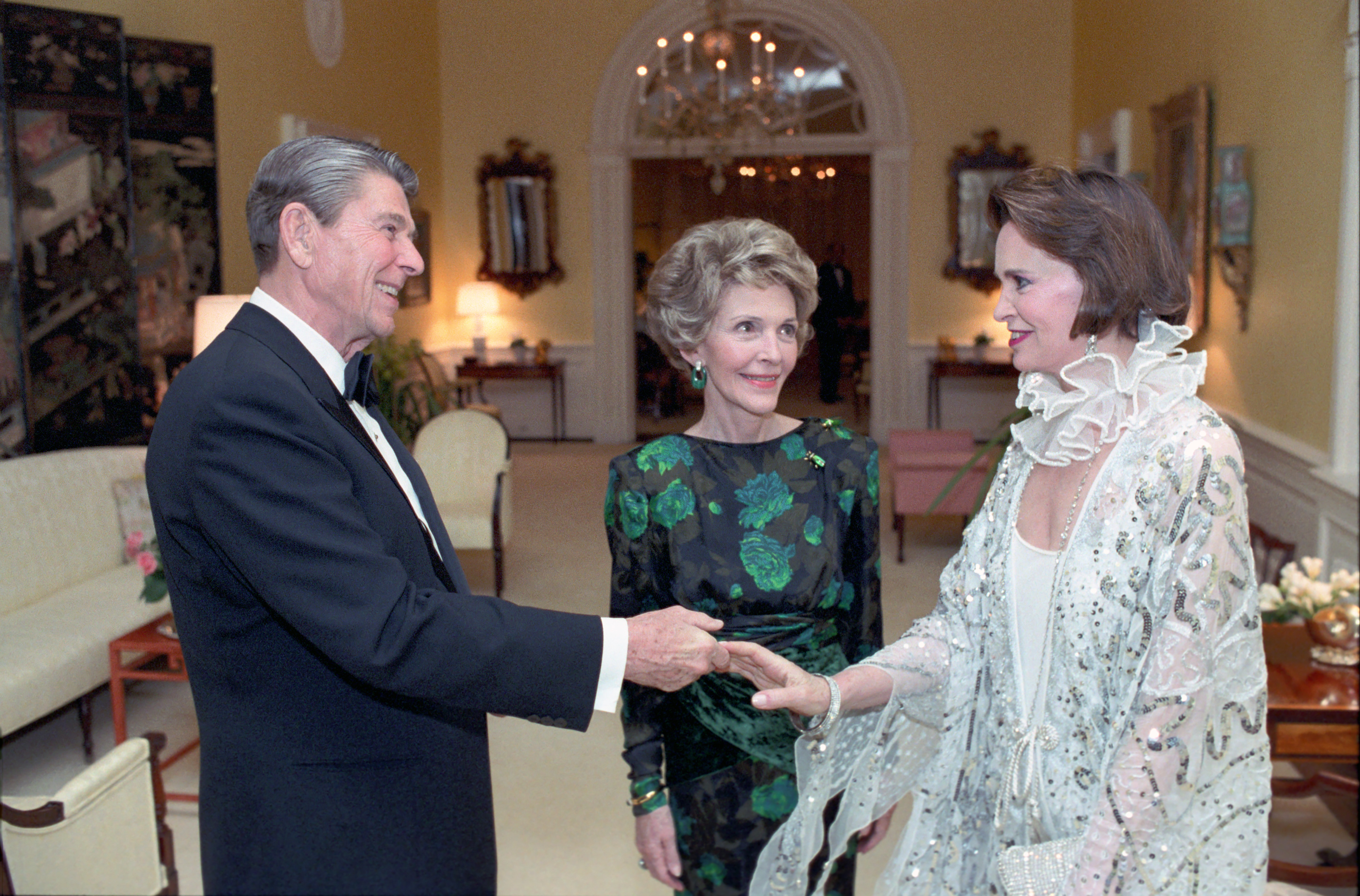
Vanderbilt greeting President Ronald Reagan and First Lady Nancy Reagan in 1985

In 1978, Vanderbilt sold the rights to her name to the Murjani Group and relaunched her own company, GV Ltd, which she had founded in 1976. With her company, she launched dresses, blouses, sheets, shoes, leather goods, liqueurs, and accessories. In the period from 1982 to 2002, L'Oreal launched eight fragrances under the brand name Gloria Vanderbilt. Murjani sold rights to the name Gloria Vanderbilt to the owners of Gitano Group Inc. in 1988.

Jones Apparel Group acquired the rights to Gloria Vanderbilt jeans in 2002.

Gloria Vanderbilt herself became an icon thanks to the numerous portrait shots. Among the famous photographers were Cecil Beaton, Gordon Parks, Horst P. Horst, Gianni Penat, Jeff Riedel, Paul Schutzer, Thomas Iannaccone, Ron Galella and Jack Robinson.

==== Fraud trial ====
In the 1980s, Vanderbilt accused her former partners in GV Ltd. and her lawyer of fraud. After a lengthy trial (during which time the lawyer died), Vanderbilt won and was awarded nearly $1.7 million, but the money was never recovered. She was also awarded $300,000 by the New York City Bar Association. Vanderbilt also owed millions of dollars in back taxes, since the lawyer had never paid the IRS, and she was forced to sell her Southampton, New York, and Upper East Side homes.

The brand's current parent company Nine West Holdings filed for bankruptcy in 2018.

=== Art ===
Vanderbilt studied art at the Art Students League of New York. She became known for her artwork, with one-woman exhibitions held of her oil paintings, watercolors, and pastels. Her first exhibition was held in 1948. This artwork was adapted and licensed, starting about 1968, by Hallmark Cards and by Bloomcraft (a textile manufacturer), and Vanderbilt began designing specifically for linen, pottery, and glassware.

In 2001, Vanderbilt returned to art and opened her first art exhibition, "Dream Boxes", at the Southern Vermont Arts Center in Manchester; it was a critical success. She launched another exhibition of 35 paintings at the Arts Center in 2007. Two years later, Vanderbilt returned to the Arts Center as a panelist at its Annual Fall Show Exhibition, signing copies of her latest novel, Obsession: An Erotic Tale.

When Vanderbilt celebrated her 90th birthday on February 20, 2014, a collection of her drawings, paintings and collages was placed on display in the 1stdibs Gallery at New York Design Center in New York City, in an exhibit called "The Left Hand Is The Dreamer".

=== Writings ===
Vanderbilt wrote two books on art and home decor, four volumes of memoirs, three novels, and a singular collection of short stories, The Things We Fear Most. She was also a regular contributor to The New York Times, Vanity Fair and Elle. In November 2010, Vanderbilt was the subject of a new book chronicling her life, The World of Gloria Vanderbilt, written by Wendy Goodman, New York magazine's design editor. The book, published by Abrams Books, featured many previously unreleased photographs.

In January 2017, HarperCollins Publishers released a book coauthored by Vanderbilt and her son Anderson Cooper, The Rainbow Comes and Goes: A Mother and Son on Life, Love, and Loss. The book was described by its publisher as "{a} touching and intimate correspondence between Anderson Cooper and his mother, Gloria Vanderbilt, offering timeless wisdom and a revealing glimpse into their lives".

=== Nothing Left Unsaid documentary ===
On April 9, 2016, HBO premiered Nothing Left Unsaid: Gloria Vanderbilt & Anderson Cooper, a two-hour documentary produced and directed by Liz Garbus. It features a series of conversations between the mother and son, covering her life and family history in the public eye.

== Personal life ==
Following the death of her paternal grandmother Alice Claypoole Vanderbilt in 1934, Gloria inherited approximately $880,000. Upon reaching her majority, the value of Gloria's inheritance fund from her father and grandmother had grown to approximately $4,717,000.

=== Marriages ===
In 1941, aged 17, Vanderbilt went to Hollywood, where she became the second wife of Pat DiCicco, an agent for actors and an alleged mobster. They divorced in 1945 and had no children together. She later alleged that DiCicco was an abusive husband who called her "Fatsy Roo" and beat her. "He would take my head and bang it against the wall," Vanderbilt said, "I had black eyes."

In April 1945, within weeks of divorcing DiCicco, Vanderbilt married conductor Leopold Stokowski, who was 42 years her senior. He had three daughters by his previous marriages to Olga Samaroff, an American concert pianist, and Evangeline Love Brewster Johnson, a Johnson & Johnson heiress. She was his third and last wife. The marriage ended in divorce in October 1955 and produced two sons: Leopold Stanislaus "Stan" Stokowski (born August 22, 1950), and Christopher Stokowski (born January 31, 1952).

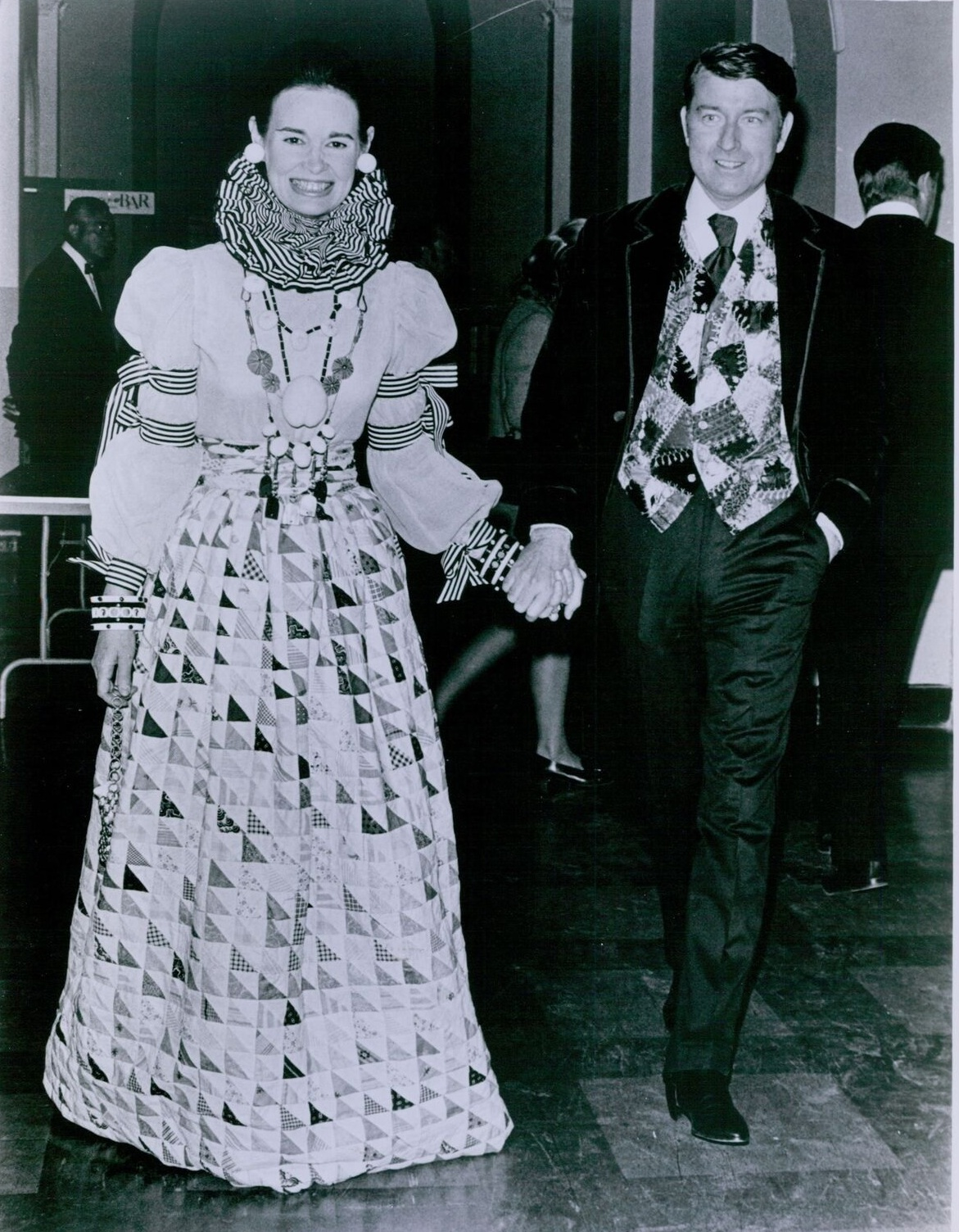
Vanderbilt with her husband Wyatt Cooper in 1970.

Vanderbilt's third husband was the director Sidney Lumet. She was the second of his four wives. They were married on August 28, 1956, and divorced in August 1963. They had no children together.

Vanderbilt's fourth marriage was to author Wyatt Emory Cooper, on December 24, 1963. The marriage, which lasted 15 years, ended with his death in 1978 while he was undergoing open-heart surgery. They had two sons: Carter Vanderbilt Cooper (January 27, 1965 – July 22, 1988), who died by suicide at age 23 by jumping to his death from the family's 14th-floor apartment, and Anderson Hays Cooper (born June 3, 1967), a CNN news anchor.

=== Relationships ===
Vanderbilt maintained a romantic relationship with photographer and filmmaker Gordon Parks for many years until his death in 2006. Other relationships included Marlon Brando, Frank Sinatra, Howard Hughes and Roald Dahl.

Vanderbilt was very close friends with fashion designer Diane von Fürstenberg. While appearing as a guest on her son Anderson Cooper's television talk show, Anderson on September 19, 2011, Vanderbilt referred to comedian and actress Kathy Griffin as her "fantasy daughter".

Truman Capote was speculated to have modeled the character of Holly Golightly in Breakfast at Tiffany's on Vanderbilt, but others say it was based on her friend Carol Grace.

=== Religious beliefs ===
Vanderbilt was baptized in the Episcopal Church as an infant, but was raised a Roman Catholic and received the Catholic sacrament of confirmation. She was particularly fascinated with St. Thérèse of Lisieux. Although religious in her youth, she was not a practicing Catholic in her later years.

=== Death and burial ===
Vanderbilt died at her home in Manhattan on June 17, 2019, aged 95, of stomach cancer. She was interred in the Vanderbilt Family Mausoleum in Staten Island, where also are buried her son, Carter Vanderbilt Cooper and fourth husband, Wyatt Emory Cooper.

While she was rumored to be worth $200 million, upon her death Vanderbilt left her younger son, Anderson Hays Cooper, her estate, which was worth approximately $1.5 million.

== Works ==
=== Art and home decor ===
- Vanderbilt, Gloria (1970). Gloria Vanderbilt Book of Collage. New York City: Galahad Books. ISBN 0-88365-097-5. OCLC 1143871.
- Vanderbilt, Gloria; Roderick, Phyllis Hingston (1977). Gloria Vanderbilt Designs for Your Home. New York: Simon & Schuster. ISBN 978-0-671-22637-4.

=== Memoirs ===
- Vanderbilt, Gloria (1979). Woman to Woman. Garden City, New York: Doubleday. ISBN 978-0-385-13645-7.
- Vanderbilt, Gloria (1985). Once Upon a Time: A True Story. New York: Alfred A. Knopf. ISBN 978-0-394-54112-9.
- Vanderbilt, Gloria (1987). Black Knight, White Knight. New York: Alfred A. Knopf. ISBN 978-0-394-54412-0.
- Vanderbilt, Gloria (1995). A Mother's Story. New York: Alfred A. Knopf. ISBN 978-0-679-45052-8.
- Vanderbilt, Gloria (2004). It Seemed Important at the Time: A Romance Memoir. New York: Simon & Schuster. ISBN 978-0-743-26480-8.
- Cooper, Anderson and Gloria Vanderbilt (2016). The Rainbow Comes and Goes. Harper-Collins. ISBN 978-0-06-245494-2.

=== Novels ===
- Vanderbilt, Gloria (1989). Never Say Good-Bye: A Novel. New York: Alfred A. Knopf. ISBN 978-0-394-57155-3.
- Vanderbilt, Gloria (1994). The Memory Book of Starr Faithfull: A Novel. New York: Alfred A. Knopf. ISBN 978-0-394-58775-2.
- Vanderbilt, Gloria (2009). Obsession: An Erotic Tale. New York: HarperCollins. ISBN 978-0-061-73489-2.
