= Pierre Chouteau Jr. =

American merchant (1789–1865)

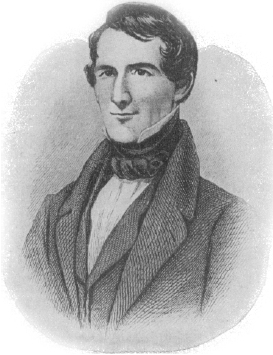
- Born: January 19, 1789; St. Louis, Louisiana (New Spain)
- Died: September 6, 1865 (aged 76); St. Louis, Missouri
- Father: Jean-Pierre Chouteau
- Relatives: Auguste Pierre Chouteau (brother); François Chouteau (half brother)

Pierre Chouteau Jr. (January 19, 1789 – September 6, 1865), also referred to as Pierre Cadet Chouteau, was an American merchant and a member of the wealthy Chouteau fur-trading family of St. Louis, Missouri.

== Early life and education ==
Chouteau was born in St. Louis, where his father, Jean Pierre Chouteau, was one of the first settlers and part of the ethnic French elite. His mother was Pelagie Kiersereau (1767–1793). One of his brothers was Auguste Pierre Chouteau. A half-brother (by his father's second wife Brigitte Saucier) was François Chouteau, a trader who became one of the first European-American settlers of Kansas City, Missouri. His son-in-law was John F. A. Sanford who later became one of Chouteau's business partners.

== Career ==
Pierre Chouteau followed in the family footsteps by starting a trade with the Osage tribe at age 15. He also operated lead mines around Dubuque, Iowa until the War of 1812. Chouteau was a member of Bernard Pratte and Company, the Western agent for John Jacob Astor's American Fur Company in 1827. He pioneered the use of steamboats on the Missouri River.

In 1834, Pratte and Chouteau bought all the Missouri River interests of the Astor Fur company. (The northern portion of Astor's company went to Ramsay Crooks, who retained the "American Fur Company" title for his company.) It was reorganized in 1838 as Pierre Chouteau, Jr. and Company and continued until it dissolved in 1864.

In 1847 Pierre and his brother Auguste established Fort Benton in present-day Chouteau County, Montana as the last fur trading post on the Upper Missouri River.

In the early days, the Chouteau interests supplied pelts for the beaver hat industry. When the industry began to collapse around 1850, they began a trade in buffalo hides. Chouteau also invested heavily in railroads, rolling mills, and mining.

He was an influential contributor to US Senator Thomas Hart Benton. Benton was the namesake for Fort Benton when it was purchased by the US Army in 1865.

Chouteau died at his daughter's home in St. Louis on September 6, 1865.

== Legacy and honors ==
- Chouteau County, Montana, was named for him, as is the town Choteau in nearby Teton County.
- He built Fort Pierre in South Dakota, which was named for him. Pierre, South Dakota, the state capital across the Missouri river from Fort Pierre, also is named for him.

== Papers ==
A portion of the Pierre Chouteau and Family Papers are available for research use at the Minnesota Historical Society. They consist of original, photostatic copies from the Missouri Historical Society, and typed transcripts of letters between Pierre Chouteau, Henry Chouteau, Ramsay Crooks, George Davenport, Hercules L. Dousman, Kenneth McKenzie, Henry M. Rice, Joseph Rolette, Henry H. Sibley, Joseph M. Street, and others as well as contracts, accounts, and other related documents concerning the fur trade, fur companies, the Dakota, Sauk, and Fox Indians, and similar matters. Some digital content is available.
