= Lee Hill =

Lee Hill may refer to:

- Lee Hill (writer), American biographer
- Lee Hill (actor) (1894–1957), silent film actor
- Lee Hill (baseball) (1895–?), American Negro leagues baseball player
- Lee Hill (cinematographer) (1907–1952), New Zealand cinematographer
- Lee Hill (scientist), South African exercise scientist
