= Barbara Goldsmith =

American journalist and philanthropist (1931–2016)

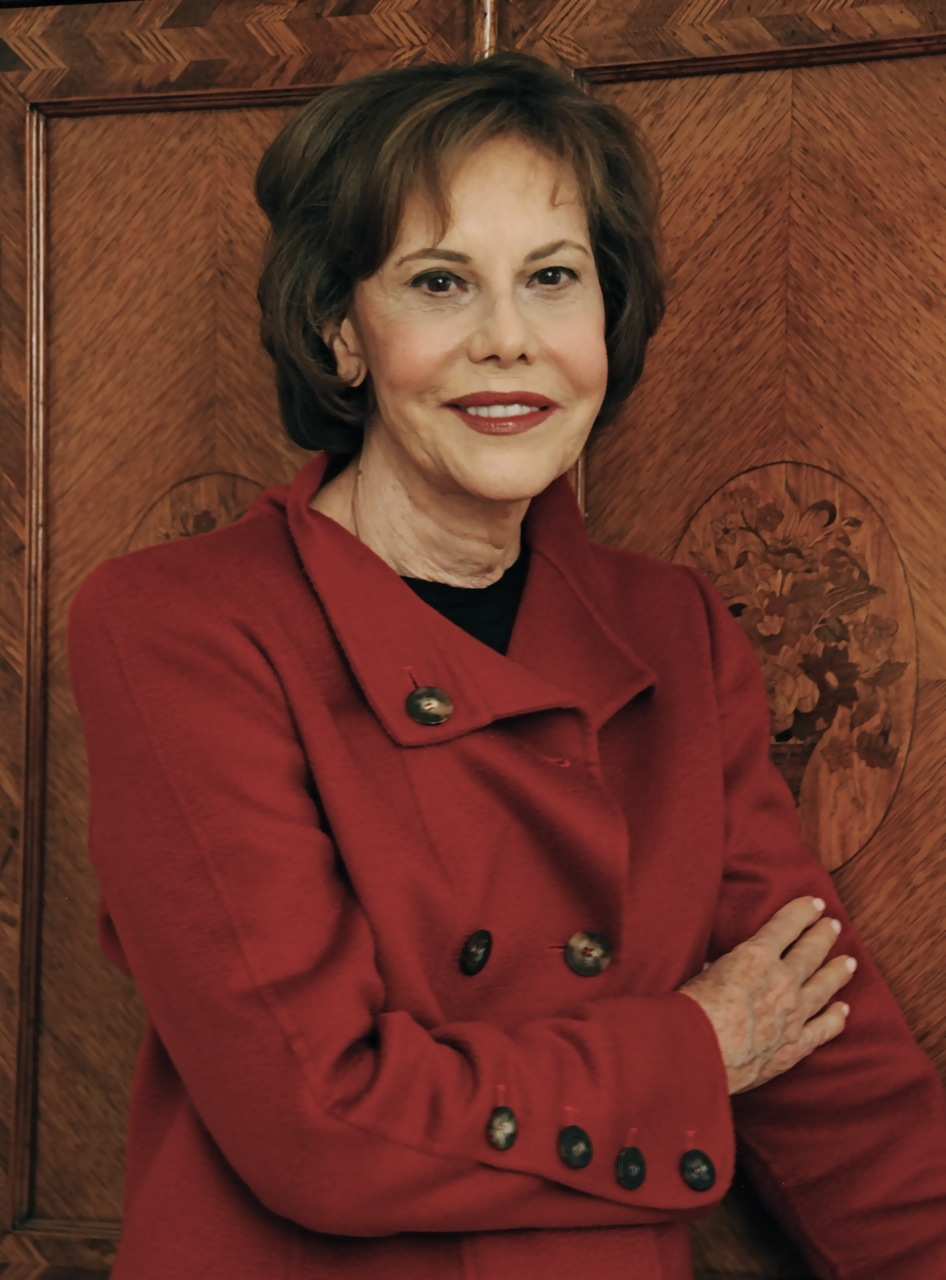
- Goldsmith in 2009
- Born: Barbara Joan Lubin; May 18, 1931; New York City, U.S.
- Died: June 26, 2016 (aged 85); New York City, U.S.
- Education: Wellesley College (B.A.)
- Occupations: Author; journalist; philanthropist
- Spouse(s): C. Gerald Goldsmith (m. 1954; div. 1969) Frank Perry (m. 1977; div. 1992)
- Children: 3
- Relatives: Joseph Lubin (father)
- Writing career
- Language: English
- Genre: New Journalism

Barbara Goldsmith (May 18, 1931 – June 26, 2016) was an American author, journalist, and philanthropist. She received critical and popular acclaim for her best-selling books, essays, articles, and her philanthropic work. She was awarded four honoris causa doctorates, and numerous awards; been elected to the American Academy of Arts and Sciences, two Presidential Commissions, and the New York State Council on the Arts; and honored by the New York Public Library Literary Lions as well as the Literacy Volunteers, the American Academy in Rome, the Authors Guild, and the Guild Hall Academy of Arts for Lifetime Achievement. In 2009, she received the Knight’s Cross of the Order of Merit medal from the Republic of Poland. In November 2008, Goldsmith was elected a “Living Landmark” by the New York Landmarks Conservancy. The Financial Times declared that "Goldsmith is leaving a legacy—one of art, literature, friends, family and philanthropy."

== Early life ==
Goldsmith was born Barbara Joan Lubin in New York City in 1931, the daughter of Joseph Lubin, a prominent accountant and real estate investor, and Evelyn Cronson, a schoolteacher. She received a Bachelor of Arts in 1953 from Wellesley College, where she majored in English, after which she took art courses at Columbia University. Her first assignments as a journalist were in the art field, where she simultaneously amassed an art collection comprising mostly contemporary American painting and sculpture. In her early twenties, she wrote a series of prize-winning profiles of such Hollywood actors as Clark Gable, Cary Grant, Joan Crawford, and Audrey Hepburn. In the late 1960s she initiated “The Creative Environment” series, interviewing Marcel Breuer, I. M. Pei, George Balanchine and Pablo Picasso, among others, about their creative process.

Goldsmith’s “The Creative Environment” caught the eye of Clay Felker, editor of the Sunday magazine supplement of the New York Herald Tribune. After the Tribune failed in 1967, Goldsmith provided Felker with the money to purchase the rights to the magazine and reinvent it as a standalone glossy, and in 1968 she became a founding editor and writer of New York, where she wrote not only about art, but also about the colorful characters in the art world. In the third issue of New York, she wrote a landmark article on Viva, one of Andy Warhol's superstars, with accompanying photographs by Diane Arbus. At the time, the article was both praised and reviled. Tom Wolfe called it “Too good not to print” and honored her with inclusion in his anthology The New Journalism. When Wolfe called her one of the originators of this movement, Goldsmith said, “I think good journalism is all that counts, not a so-called group.” Other notable New York articles included her profiles of the The Metropolitan Museum of Art Centennial and curator Henry Geldzahler’s emerging artists exhibit, Thomas Hoving, Jamie Wyeth and Andy Warhol.

Goldsmith wrote “Bacall and the Boys” in 1968, a television special about Lauren Bacall in Paris with the then young, unproven avant-garde designers Yves Saint Laurent and Giorgio Armani as well as Pierre Cardin and Marc Bohan of Dior. This earned her an Emmy Award.

In 1974, Goldsmith became an adviser to the Hearst Corporation and then a senior editor at Harper’s Bazaar, attracting top writers to the publication.

== Later life and books ==
“At magazines I got tired of making other writers look good through my re-writing,” Goldsmith wrote. From the mid-1970s, though continuing to write for The New Yorker and The New York Times among other publications, Goldsmith concentrated on writing books, all of which brought critical success and became bestsellers.

In 1975, Goldsmith published her first book, The Straw Man, a novel about the New York art world. The wealthy Royceman family’s private art collection—a hundred million dollars' worth of Old Masters, Impressionists, Neo-Impressionists, and objects d’art—has been willed by Bertram Royceman to a New York museum to be housed in a special pavilion. However, Bertie, the only son of Bertram Royceman, files suit to challenge his father’s will. The ensuing battle exposes many of the players in the art world. The book reached #1 on the bestseller lists and was praised in a review by John Kenneth Galbraith in New York as “brilliant social criticism.”

Goldsmith’s second book was Little Gloria... Happy at Last, published in 1980. The nonfiction narrative tracked the 1930s custody battle for Gloria Vanderbilt, then known as Little Gloria. The book reached the top of The New York Times and Publishers Weekly bestseller lists and was acclaimed by critics. It was a main selection of the Book of the Month club and described as a “literary masterpiece... the skill of Proust,” by Alden Whitman. The book became both a Paramount Pictures film and a major NBC television mini-series, Little Gloria... Happy at Last, starring Bette Davis, Angela Lansbury, Christopher Plummer, and Maureen Stapleton. It was nominated for six Emmys, including one which Goldsmith won.

Johnson v. Johnson, Goldsmith’s third book, completed in 1987, recounted the longest, most expensive will contest in United States history between Basia Johnson, the widow of pharmaceutical heir John Seward Johnson I, and his children from previous marriages. It, too, became a bestseller and received critical accolades, such as The Washington Post Book World calling the book, “Brilliant and gripping... I hadn't counted on Barbara Goldsmith who somehow persuaded the combatants on both sides to level with her... The accumulated tawdriness seems part of some mythic destiny.” The New York Times Book Review found it, “Intriguing... a shadowy Gothic family drama.”.

Goldsmith completed her next book in 1998. Other Powers: The Age of Suffrage, Spiritualism and the Scandalous Victoria Woodhull chronicled the women of the Gilded Age who fought for equality and the right to vote. Centered around the controversial newspaper editor, spiritualist and free love advocate Victoria Woodhull, author Jane Stanton Hitchcock described the work as "a whole vivid and inclusive way of writing history. It’s spellbinding.” The New York Times’ Richard Bernstein hailed it as an “absorbing, sweeping book... the richness of its narrative, the complex and morally nuanced portraits of its character... You finish it nearly out of breath astonished at the tragic heroism of the flawed character who tried to challenge the American Establishment.” Other Powers was the finalist for the Los Angeles Book Prize. The book was optioned to become a motion picture.

Her final book, Obsessive Genius: The Inner World of Marie Curie, has been translated into 21 languages worldwide. The work is based on the workbooks, letters, and diaries of Marie Curie, which had been sealed for sixty years because they were still radioactive. It won the prize for the Best Book of 2006 from the American Institute of Physics and its thirteen affiliated societies, earned Goldsmith the Knight’s Cross of the Order of Merit medal for service to the Republic of Poland in 2009.

In 2013, Goldsmith received the Wellesley Alumnae Achievement Award and the Erwin Piscator Honorary Award for her writing. She died in New York City on June 26, 2016, at the age of 85. She is survived by three children and six grandchildren.

== Philanthropy ==
The President of the Carnegie Corporation, Vartan Gregorian, named Goldsmith along with David Rockefeller and Brooke Astor on his list of America’s ten most enlightened philanthropists. Gregorian particularly noted the campaign she spearheaded to convert books and documents to permanent paper lasting 300 years instead of disintegrating in thirty and her securing of $20 million from the federal government for this work.

Her major philanthropic efforts included the donation of two preservation and conservation laboratories at the New York Public Library and at New York University, where she also funded a series of business lectures in honor of her father, Joseph I. Lubin, and a lecture series on preservation and conservation. She served on various committees at the New York Public Library, including the Patron Committee, the Program & Policy Committee, and the Committee on Archives, Library, and Research. Since 2010, the New York Public Library Services Center, a 126-square-foot (11.7 m^{2}) building with 220 workers, has housed the Barbara Goldsmith Preservation and Conservation Divisions. Goldsmith also funded a rare book library at the American Academy in Rome and a preservation and conservation treatment facility at Wellesley College. She served on the Presidential Commission on Preservation and Access during the Bill Clinton administration and received the American Archival Association’s top award.

Among her early major philanthropic efforts was the 1968 founding of the Center for Learning Disabilities at Albert Einstein College of Medicine. In 1974, she worked with Adele Auchincloss, the wife of Louis Auchincloss), to have the city, state and parks department install safety surf, a cushioning material, under swings and slides in every park and playground in the five boroughs of New York City. Goldsmith initiated many other anonymous grants.

In 1987, Goldsmith founded the PEN/Barbara Goldsmith Freedom to Write Award in order to spotlight writers of conscience in 113 countries who have disappeared, were tortured, or were in prison at the time of the awards. By 2009, 34 out of 37 imprisoned writers had been released, often within months of the award. She helped establish the Core Freedoms Program which confines itself to free expression work in the United States. Larry Siems, Director of PEN Freedom to Write, declared of Goldsmith, “Her innovative idea and persistence and skill brought all this to fruition.” The PEN/Barbara Goldsmith Freedom to Write Award was instrumental in starting the campaign that led to the Chinese writer Liu Xiaobo winning the 2010 Nobel Peace Prize.

== Selected awards and honors ==
- 2013 Wellesley College Alumnae Achievement Award
- Erwin Piscator Honorary Award, 2013
- 2012 Woman of Achievement Award from the Women's Project Theater
- Goldsmith received the honor of becoming a New York “Living Landmark” in recognition of her accomplishments. This honor also has been presented to Brooke Astor, Jessye Norman, Charlie Rose, Beverly Sills, and Barbara Walters among others. November 2008.
- On May 11, 2009, Goldsmith was honored before 1,000 people at a Lincoln Center ceremony by Literacy Partners for her Lifetime Achievements in the Arts.
- The American Academy of Arts and Sciences elected to make her a member of this distinguished body founded in 1780 by John Adams, James Bowdoin, John Hancock. April 15, 2000.
- Authors Guild Award for Distinguished Literary Achievements, 2007
- Obsessive Genius: The Inner World of Marie Curie won the single prize for the “best book on physics written by a non-physicist” from the thirteen affiliated societies of the American Institute of Physics.
- Knight’s Cross of the Order of Merit medal from the Republic of Poland for her contribution to Polish culture, 2009.
- National Archives Award, also presented to Kenneth Burns, for contributions to American History.
- The New York Public Library honored Goldsmith as a Literary Lion with a group including Toni Morrison, Norman Mailer, Tom Wolfe among others.
- The New York State Council on the Arts.
- Elected to the Council on Foreign Relations.
- Presidential Commission on Preservation and Access.
- Emmy for the CBS special “Bacall and the Boys”.
- Two television Emmys as writer and executive producer for Little Gloria… Happy At Last.
- Other Powers: The Age of Suffrage, Spiritualism and the Scandalous Victoria Woodhull finalist for the Los Angeles Book Prize, 1998.
- Presidential Citation from Bill Clinton, July 15, 1998.
- Presidential appointment to the eight person Presidential Commission for the Celebration of Women in American History, 1999.
- Association of American Publishers best non-fiction award.
- New York University Presidential Citation, 1993.
- The Brandeis Library Trust Award for outstanding writing.
- The Guild Hall Lifetime Literary Achievement Award.
- Poets & Writers “Writers for Writers” Award, 1999.

== Organizations ==
- New York Public Library. Trustee since 1987. Served on Executive Committee, Nominating Committee, Library Policy Committee, Finance & Acquisitions Committee and others.
- American Academy in Rome. Trustee since 1994. Served on Executive Committee, Committee on Fine Arts.
- The Dorothy & Lewis B. Cullman Center for Scholars & Writers. Advisory Board since its inception in 1999.
- PEN (Poets, Essayist, Novelists) American Center. Trustee, Core Freedoms Committee, Executive Committee, Advisory Board, originator of PEN/Barbara Goldsmith Freedom to Write Award.

== Bibliography ==
Books

- Goldsmith, Barbara. The Straw Man. 1975. Farrar, Straus & Giroux, New York. (ISBN 0374270902)
- Goldsmith, Barbara. Little Gloria... Happy at Last. 1980. Alfred A. Knopf, Inc., New York. (ISBN 978-0-394-42836-9)
- Goldsmith, Barbara. Johnson v. Johnson. 1987. Alfred A. Knopf, Inc., New York. (ISBN 0394560434)
- Goldsmith, Barbara. Other Powers: The Age of Suffrage, Spiritualism and the Scandalous Victoria Woodhull. 1998. Alfred A. Knopf, Inc., New York.(ISBN 0394555368)
- Goldsmith, Barbara. Obsessive Genius: The Inner World of Marie Curie. 2005. W.W. Norton & Company, Inc., New York. (ISBN 0393051374)

Selected articles and essays

- “La Dolce Viva,” New York magazine, April 1968.
- “How Henry (Geldzahler) Made 43 Artists Immortal,” New York magazine, 1974.
- “Comment on Culture,” Harper’s Bazaar (special arts & literature issue with artist James Rosenquist), editor and writer, January 1969.
- “The Meaning of Celebrity,” New York Times, December 4, 1983.
- “Women on the Edge: The Streetwalker’s Life,” The New Yorker, April 26, 1993.

Selected profiles of the author

- “A Testament of Riches Shared,” by Pamela Ryckman. Financial Times, September 28, 2007. Available online .
- “Saving Books From the Paper They're Printed On,” by Eleanor Blau. New York Times, November 27, 1994. Available online.
- New York Social Diary Interview with Barbara Goldsmith, by David Patrick Columbia. Available online.
- Aspen Magazine profile of author: “Leading the Way,” by Daniel Shaw. Aspen Magazine, Summer 2005.
