= James F. Hollingsworth =

United States Army general

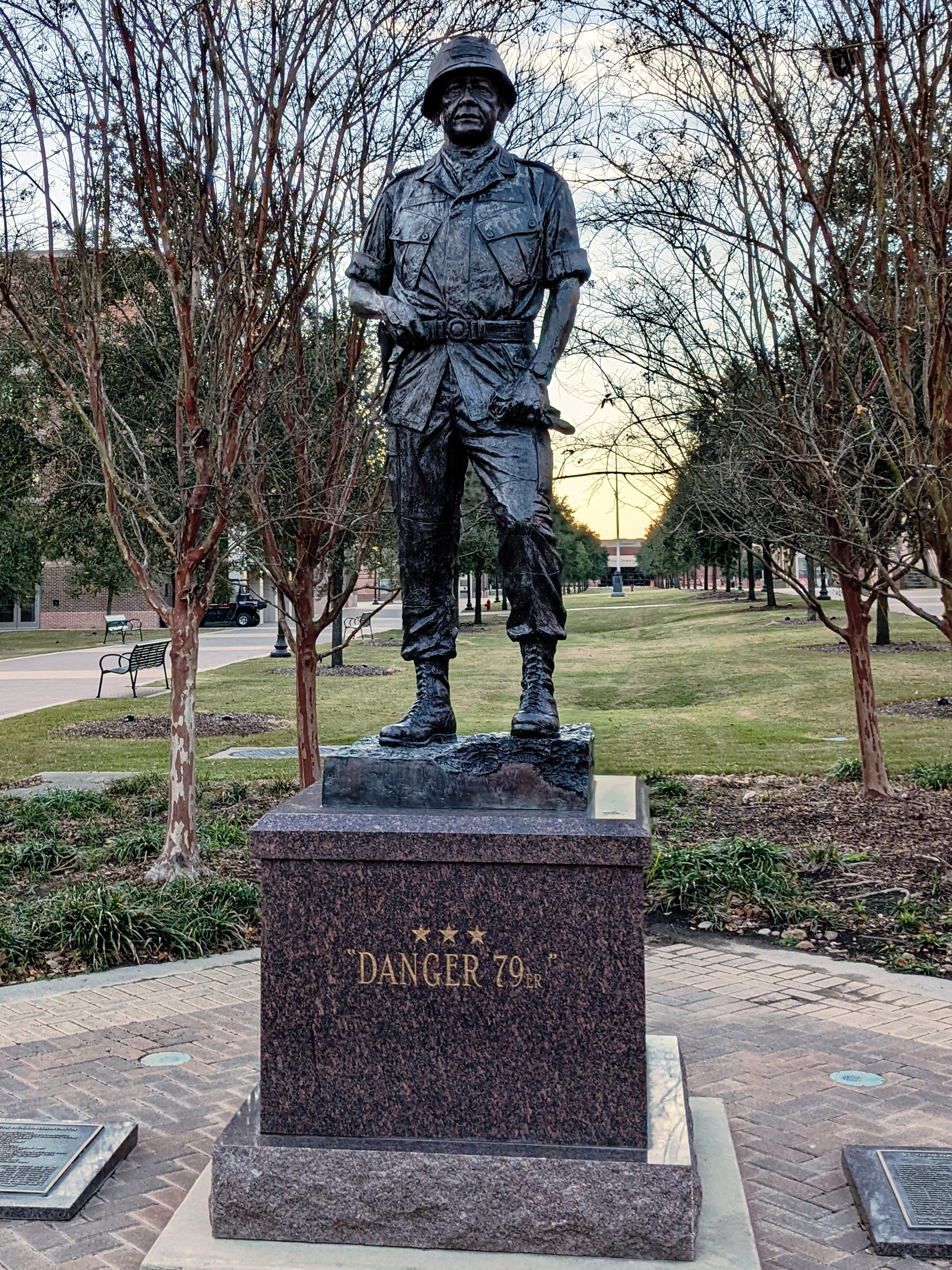
- Statue of James F. Hollingsworth at Texas A&M University
- Born: March 24, 1918; Sanger, Texas
- Died: March 2, 2010 (aged 91); San Antonio, Texas
- Burial place: Arlington National Cemetery
- Military career
- Allegiance: United States
- Branch: United States Army
- Service years: 1940–1976
- Rank: Lieutenant General
- Nicknames: "Holly" "Danger 79er"
- Commands: I Corps; U.S. Army Alaska; Third Regional Assistance Command
- Conflicts: World War II; Vietnam War
- Awards: Distinguished Service Cross (3); Distinguished Service Medal (4); Silver Star (4); Legion of Merit (3); Distinguished Flying Cross (3); Soldier's Medal; Bronze Star Medal (4); Purple Heart (6); Air Medal (38)

James Francis Hollingsworth (March 24, 1918 – March 2, 2010) was a United States Army lieutenant general.

== Early life ==
Hollingsworth was born and raised a few miles north of Sanger, Texas. In 1935 he entered North Texas Agricultural College, and attended for one year before transferring to Texas A&M. While there he was a member of the Corps of Cadets and graduated in May 1940 with a degree in agriculture. Upon graduation he was commissioned a US Army reserve officer, and took a job in Houston before being called to active duty two months later.

== World War II ==
Hollingsworth served in the Third Army during World War II with the 2nd Battalion, 67th Armored Regiment and was wounded five times.

== Vietnam War ==
Brigadier General Hollingsworth served as assistant commander of the 1st Infantry Division in 1966–67. Hollingsworth and new division commander Major General William E. DePuy relieved a number of commanders whom they regarded as combat ineffective. During this tour he was profiled by English journalist Nicholas Tomalin in his story The General Goes Zapping Charlie Cong, which was published in The Sunday Times on 5 June 1966. After reading of these activities DePuy and Hollingsworth were reprimanded by Chief of Staff of the United States Army Harold K. Johnson who wrote to DePuy: "If I had wanted a lead scout in command of the 1st Division you would not have gotten the job. Your value and Holly's is proportional to the responsibility that you have for something over 15,000 men. Your job is not to shoot VC. Your job is to see that other people shoot VC." Tomalin's story was later used as part of the inspiration for the character Lieutenant Colonel Bill Kilgore in the film Apocalypse Now.

On 31 August 1967, as a result of the criticisms of the Army National Guard during the 1967 Detroit riot, the Chief of Staff of the United States Army set up a board under Hollingsworth, then deputy commanding general of the United States Army Test and Evaluation Command, to look into the leadership of both the National Guard and the Army Reserve.

In 1972 Hollingsworth was serving as Commander of Third Regional Assistance Command in III Corps. During the Battle of An Lộc, part of the North Vietnamese Easter Offensive, Hollingsworth was responsible for organizing the air support that allowed the Army of the Republic of Vietnam forces to hold the town and ultimately defeat the People's Army of Vietnam assault. During an interview taped by CBS, Hollingsworth said that he would never entertain a proposal by the Red Cross that the two sides should declare a temporary cease-fire at An Loc to treat the wounded. On another occasion, speaking of An Loc's attackers, he told reporters he intended to "kill them all before they get back to Cambodia." In each case it was clear that Hollingsworth considered himself the effective commander at An Lộc, even though a South Vietnamese officer was technically in charge. COMUSMACV General Creighton Abrams reportedly instructed Hollingsworth to "shut his mouth."

In April 1972 Hollingsworth commented on the declining morale and discipline among US forces remaining in South Vietnam stating: "It is very common to observe U.S. soldiers driving and riding in trucks along the roads and highways in the Long Binh-Bien Hoa-Saigon area who are a disgrace to the Army and to the United States... Seldom does one see such a soldier with a proper haircut wearing a complete and proper uniform. Frequently, they wear no headgear and are in their undershirts. Many times they are bare to the waist. Further, many of our soldiers wear defaced hats and jackets with unauthorized embroidered and stenciled symbols and sayings, pins, buttons, and other items that give them a hippie like appearance. In addition, these soldiers often operate their vehicles in an equally careless manner...Standards (observed off post) merely reflect standards practiced on post."

== Post-Vietnam ==
Hollingsworth served as commander U.S. Army Alaska until October 1971 when he was replaced by Major General Charles M. Gettys.

Hollingsworth served as commander of I Corps in the Republic of Korea from mid-1973. During his time in Korea Hollingsworth updated the existing operational plans for defense against a North Korean attack, OPLAN 5027, from a largely defensive strategy to a forward-based offensive strategy known as OPLAN 5027–74, in which after blunting the initial North Korean assault the US/ROK forces would seize Kaesong and then go on to capture Pyongyang.

Hollingsworth retired and was replaced by Lieutenant General John H. Cushman in March 1976. Hollingsworth's planned retirement was apparently accelerated following a January 13, 1976 interview with the Wall Street Journal where Hollingsworth stated that he had prepared for "a short violent war" following any North Korean attack that the US/ROK forces would win in 9 days. He stated: "We'll need five days and nights of real violence, after that we'll need four more days to tidy up the battlefield."

== Civilian career ==
Following his retirement from the Army, Hollingsworth was commissioned to prepare an analysis of the Army's conventional warfighting capabilities, particularly to repel a Warsaw Pact attack in Europe, this "Hollingsworth Report" published in 1976 was used to procure increased funding for Army and NATO readiness.

== Later life ==
Hollingsworth died on 2 March 2010 in San Antonio, Texas and was buried at Arlington National Cemetery.
