= Joseph Lubin =

Joseph Lubin may refer to:

- Joseph Lubin (accountant) (1899–1983), American accountant
- Joseph Lubin (entrepreneur) (born 1964), Canadian entrepreneur
