= Blue Movie (novel) =

1970 novel by Terry Southern

- Author: Terry Southern
- Language: English
- Genre: Novel
- Publisher: World Publishing Company
- Publication date: 1970
- Publication place: United States
- Media type: Print Hardback
- Pages: 287
- ISBN: 9780714509662
- Preceded by: Red-Dirt Marijuana and Other Tastes
- Followed by: Texas Summer

Blue Movie is a satirical novel by Terry Southern about the making of a high-budget pornographic film featuring major movie stars. In the book, a highly regarded art film director named "Boris Adrian" attempts to create such a film. Blue Movie was published in 1970.

According to author Stephen Thrower in his book Nightmare USA, Stanley Kubrick considered adapting Blue Movie for film, but the project never materialized. All the same, the book is dedicated to Kubrick. Thrower speculates that the film-within-the-film Alex is forced to watch in Kubrick's A Clockwork Orange is the closest we'll come to a visualization of such a collaboration.
