= Nile Southern =

American filmmaker and writer

Nile Southern (born December 29, 1960), is an American filmmaker and writer. He is noted for his book The Candy Men, a "biography of a book", about the writing and publishing of the comic sex novel Candy, by Terry Southern and Mason Hoffenberg. He is the son of writer Terry Southern and literary editor Carol Southern.
