= The Telephone (1988 film) =

- Directed by: Rip Torn
- Written by: Terry Southern; Harry Nilsson
- Produced by: Robert A. Katz; Moctesuma Esparza
- Starring: Whoopi Goldberg; Severn Darden; Elliott Gould; John Heard; Amy Wright
- Cinematography: David Claessen
- Edited by: Sandra Adair
- Music by: Christopher Young
- Distributed by: New World Pictures
- Release date: January 22, 1988
- Running time: 82 minutes
- Country: United States
- Language: English
- Budget: $2.2 million
- Box office: $99,978

The Telephone is a 1988 comedy-drama film written by Terry Southern and Harry Nilsson and the only film directed by Rip Torn.

The film stars Whoopi Goldberg as out-of-work actress Vashti Blue who starts making some prank phone calls which creates a chain of events. The entirety of the film is set in Vashti's apartment and features few actors other than Goldberg. Elliott Gould and John Heard appear in supporting roles.

The film was released on January 22, 1988, by New World Pictures to negative critical reception and poor box office.

== Plot ==
Set mostly in a small San Francisco apartment and almost in real-time, Vashti Blue is an out-of-work actress who returns to her home that she shares with her pet goldfish and an owl. On the answering machine, Vashti listens to her messages and hears her agent remind her of an audition, as well as a notification about her overdue telephone bill. She also hears a voice she believes is her former lover, Larry.

Throughout the night, Vashti entertains herself by dialing different telephone numbers, and talking to the local food market, video store, police station and her friend Jennifer. The noise from Vashti's phone conversations causes Vashti's next-door neighbor to yell at her in frustration. Later, Vashti's former agent, Rodney, and his new client, "Honey Boxe," arrive, asking to use her telephone. However, Vashti refuses Rodney's request. Rodney tells Vashti that her bad attitude always made it difficult to find her acting jobs. Annoyed, Vashti asks Rodney and Honey Boxe to leave, which they do.

At the climax, it is eventually revealed that Vashti is really medically unstable, as a telephone contractor arrives at her apartment to confiscate the phone handset due to her dispute with her phone bill. It is revealed that her telephone line was disconnected some time ago, much to her denial. As he struggles to take the handset, she strikes him in the head and stabs him with a knife, killing him. The final shot shows Vashti trying to phone the police to report the incident, in which it's heard for the first time that the telephone that she has been talking into throughout the film has no dial tone.

== Cast ==
- Whoopi Goldberg as Vashti Blue
- Severn Darden as Max
- Elliott Gould as Rodney
- John Heard as Telephone Man
- Amy Wright as Honey Boxe
- Herve Villechaize as Voice on the Freeway (voice)

== Production ==
=== Background ===
The Telephone was produced by Hawkeye, a company formed by screenwriter Terry Southern and singer-songwriter Harry Nilsson. According to Southern, "We had this idea about an out-of-work actor who gets so into hallucinatory-type improvisations that he even makes up phone calls to himself." Nilsson and Southern wrote the screenplay with Robin Williams in mind for the main character, and attempted to get the comedian a copy of the script, but Williams' manager did not want him to make the film but would rather star in Good Morning, Vietnam. After viewing Whoopi Goldberg's standup performances, Nilsson and Southern thought that she would be right for the part. Having seen Rip Torn's direction of stage plays, the writers felt that Torn would be ideal to direct the film.

=== Filming ===
Filming was shot in 12 days, officially beginning on January 13, 1987, in San Francisco, California.

The film's producers persuaded Goldberg to ignore the film's script and improvise, leading to arguments with Torn, who preferred to direct the film as scripted.

=== Post-production ===
Goldberg states that she was given approval over the film's final cut. The film was screened at the Sundance Film Festival in a version edited by Torn. Unhappy with Torn's editing of the film, Goldberg filed a $5 million lawsuit against New World Pictures and Torn to prevent its release. Following arbitration, the jury found in favor of New World.

== Reception ==
When the film was screened in New York, audiences allegedly cried out "I want my money back!" and "I hope the film breaks!" Grossing $54,811 during its opening weekend, the film went on to become a box office flop with a total domestic gross of $99,978.

The movie was poorly received by critics, with The New York Times stating that the quotes mentioned in this section were "the truest, most sanely existential lines spoken during the film [that] night," as the Los Angeles Times wrote "Sorry, but [the film] is a wrong number." Leonard Maltin wrote that "Goldberg may have hit rock bottom with this clinker". For her role in the film, Goldberg was nominated for a Golden Raspberry Award for Worst Actress at the 9th Golden Raspberry Awards. According to Southern, "I was ambivalent about it. I was too close to the film to be objective, but a number of people ended up liking the released film. [The New World version] is still selling well as a cassette at my local drug store." Obsessed with Film named The Telephone as the 10th best "One Man Band" film, in a list of films with only one or very few characters.
