= Candy (Southern and Hoffenberg novel) =

Book by Maxwell Kenton

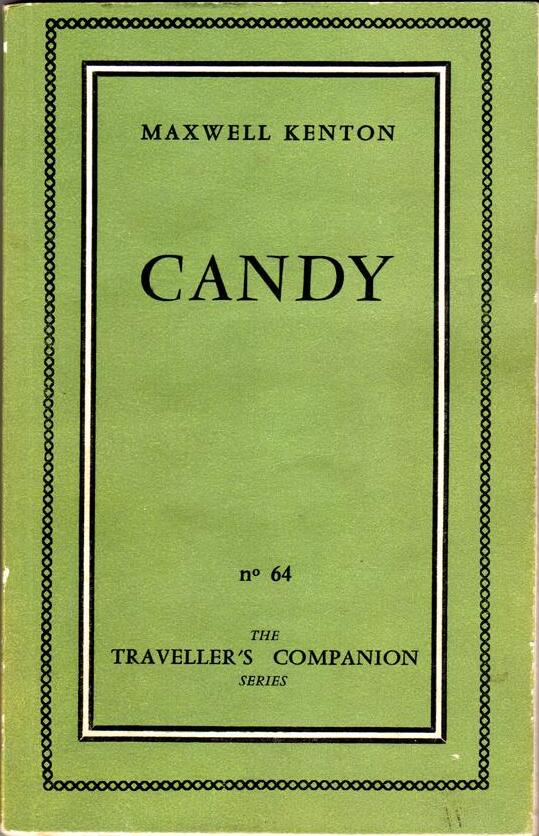
- First edition
- Author: Terry Southern; Mason Hoffenberg
- Language: English
- Genre: Novel
- Published: 1958
- Publisher: Olympia Press (France); G. P. Putnam's Sons (United States); Lancer Books (paperback)
- Media type: Print (hardback & paperback)
- ISBN: 978-0802134295

Candy is a 1958 novel written by Maxwell Kenton, the pseudonym of Terry Southern, and Mason Hoffenberg, who wrote it in collaboration for the "dirty book" publisher Olympia Press, which published the novel as part of its "Traveller's Companion" series. According to Hoffenberg,

Terry Southern and I wrote Candy for the money. Olympia Press, $500 flat. He was in Switzerland, I was in Paris. We did it in letters. But when it got to be a big deal in the States, everybody was taking it seriously. Do you remember what kind of shit people were saying? One guy wrote a review about how Candy was a satire on Candide. So right away I went back and reread Voltaire to see if he was right. That's what happens to you. It's as if you vomit in the gutter and everybody starts saying it's the greatest new art form, so you go back to see it, and, by God, you have to agree.

Southern had a different take on the novel's genesis, claiming it was based on a short story he had written about a girl living in New York's Greenwich Village neighborhood, a Good Samaritan-type, who became involved with a hunchback. After he read Southern's story in manuscript form, Hoffenberg suggested the character should have more adventures. Southern suggested that Hoffenberg write a story about the girl, and he came up with the chapter in which Candy meets Dr. Krankheit at the hospital.

He wrote that and I began to write other chapters. Every once in a while, I would show him what I wrote. It was like telling jokes back and forth. Your hearing of the joke becomes as important as telling the joke. In that sense, it was such a good thing because there was this built-in obligation to write the next chapter. It was like returning a good favor. That approach worked quite well and was in perfect sync with the kind of creative work that people try to do together.

They finished the book in the commune of Tourrettes-sur-Loup France, in a cottage that Southern's friend Mordecai Richler rented for them.

Southern and Hoffenberg battled Olympia Press publisher Maurice Girodias over the story's copyright after the book was published in North America by Putnam under the authors' own names and became a best-seller.

In 2006, Playboy Magazine listed Candy among the "25 Sexiest Novels Ever Written", and described the story as a "young heroine's picaresque travels, a kind of sexual pinball machine that lights up academia, gardeners, the medical profession, mystics and bohemians."

The novel was made into a film by Christian Marquand in 1968 as Candy.

Several of the items depicted in this book were included by director Gail Palmer in the 1978 adult film The Erotic Adventures of Candy whose opening credits state it is based on Voltaire's Candide.

The book The Candy Men by Nile Southern, published in 2004 by Arcade Publishing, details the lives of Southern and Hoffenberg as they came to write, publish and then endure the wildly improbable success of the novel. Unusual in the field of books about literature, The Candy Men makes a lengthy investigation of the rampant sharing of the inadvertently uncopyrighted original novel.

== Plot ==
Candy Christian, aged eighteen, is an extremely pretty and desirable but naïve young woman, who finds herself in a variety of farcical sexual situations as a result of her desire to help others. The men in her life, regardless of age or relationship, wish only to possess her.

Having eluded the pursuits of her philosophy instructor Prof. Mephesto, she returns to her father's house, where she plans to allow the family gardener to sexually initiate her. However, her father steps in, and angrily denouncing the gardener as a Communist, attacks him and in the ensuing scuffle ends up with a fractured skull. Candy visits him in the hospital. Mr. Christian's twin brother Jack and his lascivious wife Olivia (Livia) are also present. Aunt Livia leaves, and Uncle Jack attempts to have sex with Candy; a nurse enters and wrestles him away from the girl, who escapes, only to find herself in the lair of young Dr. Krankeit, who is studying the salutary effects of masturbation. (Aunt Livia also has an adventure with Krankeit, which she later describes to Candy in a cheery letter.) Back in the hospital room, the patient (in identical head-bandages after the scuffle with the nurse) turns out to be Jack; Candy's father has gotten up quietly and left.

In the next chapter, some time has passed and Candy has now moved to New York City's Greenwich Village and lives on her own. On her way to work, Candy encounters a perverted hunchback, whom she takes for a sort of performance artist and invites to her apartment. Subsequently, she is propositioned by school friends in a café, and by a gynecologist who overhears their conversation and gives Candy an "exam" in the bathroom. The café is raided by police and Candy escapes with the help of Pete Uspy, an anti-materialist (the only man in the novel with no designs on Candy's body) who sends her to the camp of the peace activist Crackers. Their leader Grindle is a would-be guru who talks Candy into intercourse by couching it in metaphysical terms. When Candy fears she is pregnant, he tells her the next phase of her spiritual journey is beginning, and buys her a one-way ticket to Calcutta, India. Soon after, Candy is meditating in a temple in Lhasa, along with a dung-encrusted pilgrim who sits nearby, when a thunderstorm occurs. She finds herself pinned between the fallen, lightning-struck statue of Buddha and the pilgrim. As he has the usual physical reaction experienced by men in Candy's proximity, she becomes aware of his identity when the rain washes his face clean (it is her father), and the novel closes with her cry of recognition.
