= The General Goes Zapping Charlie Cong =

"The General Goes Zapping Charlie Cong" is an example of The New Journalism by Nicholas Tomalin, an English journalist, in 1966. It relates a day’s activities of General James F. Hollingsworth during the Vietnam War. It first appeared in the British newspaper The Sunday Times.

Nicholas Tomalin (30 October 1931 – 17 October 1973) was an English investigative reporter and foreign correspondent who wrote for various London newspapers. He died while reporting the 1973 Arab-Israeli Yom Kippur War. Tomalin wrote "The General Goes Zapping Charlie Cong" for the weekly London paper The Sunday Times, which ran the story on 5 June 1966.

General James Francis Hollingsworth (24 March 1918 – 2 March 2010) was born in Sanger, Texas on a family farm. He graduated from Texas A&M in 1940 and was commissioned as a Second Lieutenant in the U.S. Army. A decorated and battle-hardened World War II veteran, Hollingsworth was a 48-year-old Brigadier General when Tomalin wrote this Sunday Times article.

== Historical context ==
1966 saw a period of escalation (i.e. increased U.S. involvement in the ground war) initiated by President Lyndon B. Johnson. This escalation was carried out in an attempt to halt the U.S. and South Vietnamese "losing trend" that had prevailed in prior months. The escalation was carried out in accordance with Phase Two of General William Westmoreland’s three- point victory plan. The escalation marked a significant shift in U.S. strategy (defensive to offensive), and provoked a matching escalation on the part of the North Vietnamese, trapping the two combatants in a perpetuating cycle of escalation. A key region wherein this escalation strategy was employed was the Iron Triangle, a 120 square mile area located roughly twenty-five miles north of Saigon, precisely the region that Hollingsworth describes to Tomalin at the outset of the article. Route 13 is a major thoroughfare running from Saigon, through the Iron Triangle, to the Cambodian border. It is a landmark that General Hollingsworth refers to specifically early in Tomalin’s article. The divisional office at Ki-Na (where Tomalin begins the narrative) is situated twenty miles north of Saigon, meaning that it was just to the south (or on the southern edge) of the Iron Triangle. The Iron Triangle was an insurgent stronghold during this period, where the Viet Minh maintained an elaborate tunnel system and logistic outposts. The strength of insurgent forces in this region posed a particularly palpable threat to the U.S. Forces and U.S.- backed South Vietnamese government due to the region’s close proximity to Saigon. The U.S. Army 1st Infantry Division (A.K.A. "The Big Red One", in which Hollingsworth was a general) carried out operations throughout this area during the period 1965-1970. These missions employed typical counterinsurgency tactics that were being fine- tuned in many countries engaged in civil and revolutionary wars during this era. Some major offensive missions undertaken (or participated in) by the 1st Infantry Division during this period were Operation Attleboro, Operation Cedar Falls, and Operation Junction City. Operation Attleboro was carried out in November 1966, the same year that Tomalin reported on General Hollingsworth. Of particular importance to these operations were Search and Destroy tactics, with forces inserted, seeking out and destroy the enemy, and then quickly withdraw. This allowed a smaller number of troops to secure and occupy a comparatively larger geographic area. The civilian casualties that could result was one factor contributing to international dissent and protest regarding the conflict, and also proved to be a significant obstacle to the pacification of the region. Against this background, the mission described by Tomalin was evidently a search and destroy mission, carried out in the southern part of the Iron Triangle in 1966, which General Hollingsworth participated in actively. The General uses an M16 rifle, flies in a Bell Iroquois UH-1B helicopter, which carries two M60 7.62×51mm calibre machine guns; all of these items were typical standard- issue equipment. On the whole, it seems that Tomalin witnessed a fairly representative Search and Destroy mission, a quotidian undertaking for General Hollingsworth.

== Story summary ==
The story starts out describing how General Hollingsworth eliminates his enemies nonchalantly and is not bothered by their deaths. After pinning two medals on the Colonel's doctor for his outstanding efforts, Hollingsworth displays a map showing their next target. He states that the next mission is to free Routes 13 and 16 of any Viet Cong. Hollingsworth notes that these two roads were initially used to carry supplies up from Saigon to Phuoc Vinh. After the General motivates his team, he tells them all that they are going to "zap" all of the enemies so that no more remain. Once in his helicopter, he tells the pilots that it hasn’t been a very productive day for his unit; Alpha, Bravo, and Charlie Companies were unsuccessful in killing any enemies after finding a possible Viet Cong headquarters. When Hollingsworth learns that there has been some sniper activity in the area, he orders the pilots to take him to Battalion HQ, despite the pilots’ hesitation. Once he arrives, Hollingsworth asks the soldiers if they have killed any Congs yet. After hearing that they have not, he is infuriated and demands that they start killing as soon as possible. Back in the helicopter, Hollingsworth sees the white smoke and then witnesses the air strike that is supposedly going to eliminate all enemy targets. He says that he wasn’t sure if the snipers were in this location, but if they weren’t, he was going to "zap" the whole forest if he had to. After the pilot points out two VC running in the bushes, General Hollingsworth grabs his M16 off of the rack and leans out of the helicopter, ready to shoot the two soldiers. A smoke canister is dropped and a white vapor covers the scene. Hollingsworth circles the area five times to secure the enemies killing. These attempts were unsuccessful after the narrator admits that he just saw the running figures in the bushes. The chopper is flown low into the ground and the Lieutenant grabs the runner. General Hollingworth assures himself that the man they captured was in fact a Cong, and then they land at a base camp. An ambulance quickly arrives to administer health care to this victim. Hollingsworth discovers that this man's objective was to mine at Route 16 and fire at enemy helicopters. The General compliments himself back and forth and says that he will attack whomever he has to in order to succeed. He then states that nothing is better than "killin’ Cong".

== Literary elements ==
=== Opening and theme ===
"The General Goes Zapping Charlie Cong" opens with two brief, one- sentence paragraphs. These statements set the scene and establish the dual objective of the piece: first, to provide a brief, action- packed profile of a particularly martial general (the first sentence), and second, to investigate the causes of the tremendous civilian casualties resulting from the war. The first sentence says, in part, that the General "…took off in his personal helicopter and killed more Vietnamese than all the troops he commanded." (Wolfe, 197). Although there is much violence and bloodshed during the course of Tomalin's afternoon with the General, the narrative does not explicitly say that the General killed anyone on this day—although as much can be assumed. The second brief paragraph relates a rumored statistic of civilian casualties: "…more than four injured civilians for every wounded Viet Cong—unavoidable in this kind of war." (Wolfe, 197) This initially raises the running theme of the tremendous civilian casualties that are a consequence of the indiscriminate violence resulting from helicopter- based search and destroy missions.

=== Tone and narration ===
For the subject matter portrayed, the tone of "The General Goes Zapping Charlie Cong" is remarkably light. Tomalin's phrasing seems mostly descriptive, rather than evaluative or normative, allowing the reader to evaluate the situation (characters, events) described for him- or herself (and enabling Tomalin to provide a more impartial account). Tomalin's tone conveys a sense of action and adventure, but does not give the impression that the primary focus of the piece is the issue of civilian casualties. Tomalin's narration style is unobtrusive—presumably in another attempt to provide "hard", objective coverage, he rarely interjects his own voice. He switches to first- person point of view occasionally ("I point at a paddy field full of peasants less than half a mile away." (200), "A shower of spent cartridge cases leaps from the General’s carbine to drop, lukewarm, on my arm." (200)) for a number of plausible reasons- perhaps to provide a realistic sense of perspective. The entire piece is written from Tomalin's perspective, although most of it is in the third- person, recounting the General's actions rather than Tomalin's internal experience. Tomalin only interjects his voice as an investigative reporter into the dialogue on a few occasions, and every time he does, his goal is to reinforce the theme of civilian casualties— for example, Tomalin asks "But General, how do you know those aren’t just frightened peasants?" (200). This technique creates a sense of narrative distance that helps Tomalin's account of the facts seem balanced and disinterested. Also, by employing a relatively light tone, Tomalin seems to express something about the nature of the mission; it is a combat mission, but the soldiers fighting from the air have a tremendous technological advantage over their enemies, and as such run a much smaller risk when entering into combat. Tomalin's relatively light tone (as well as the General's) conveys this sense of detachment from the battle.

=== Plot structure and setting ===
The plot of "The General Goes Zapping Charlie Cong" is very simple (and necessarily so given its length). The exposition can be considered to be everything from the opening sentence to the point when they take off in the General's helicopter. This section introduces the General, the theme of civilian casualties, and the day's mission and purpose. The rising action is the trip to Battalion HQ and the episode with the napalm strike. The climax comes during the episode involving the young Viet Cong who the General captures. This section is particularly relevant to the theme because, in this instance, the General captures, rather than kills the enemy—although it is a close call for the young Viet Cong. The denouement is the final section of the work, after medics treat the injured Viet Cong, when Tomalin is debriefing with the General. Hollingsworth relates his justification for his "shoot first, ask questions later" approach, and expresses his delight at having a journalist witness the events of the day.

The setting, aside from the broader historical context discussed earlier (see History and Background) is the interior of the General's personal helicopter. Other than several brief scenes in various regional bases, the events of the story unfold inside the helicopter.

=== Characters ===
The only "round" (i.e. developed) character is the General. This conveys the sense that "The General Goes Zapping Charlie Cong" is a character profile of the General, even though the central issue of the piece is civilian casualties. Tomalin's physical description depicts the General as typical —"…reminiscent of every movie general you have seen." (198). Tomalin pays special attention to the General's mannerisms and colloquialisms. For instance, one of the General's lines is, "There’s nothing alive in there[…] or they’d be skedadling. Yes there is, by golly." (201) An important aspect of the General's character is his certainty and justification for fighting in such an indiscriminate manner. The General relies on his battle-hardened instincts to determine if a potential threat is posed to himself or his men. His long military career and high rank make this explanation viable. However, it seems fair to wonder (in spite of the General's certainty), whether any civilians were injured or killed in these blind, airborne attacks, and also, whether the General behaved differently due to Tomalin's presence and observation.

The other military personnel mentioned are utterly "flat" (i.e. undeveloped) characters. A few names are mentioned, but no additional details. After the General, the two most developed characters are the young Viet Cong insurgent who the General captures, and Tomalin, neither of whom can really be considered "round".

== Effects and criticism ==
There is very little criticism about Tomalin's work. This story was included in Thomas Wolfe's collection of short articles known as The New Journalism. This collection covered an assortment of subject matters and served as a vehicle for this new type of journalism to flourish. Tomalin's work received notoriety after being published in this collection. The impact on English society, according to Wolfe, was effective because it gave them a sense of emotion for the Vietnam war. The English saw how the Congs were being murdered and "zapped" across the board and felt a sense of sorrow for the Vietnamese civilians that were being mistaken for soldiers. Wolfe also notes how Tomalin's piece created somewhat of an attraction of the war. One typically does not enjoy the act of war. "The General Goes Zapping Charlie Cong" spiked British people's interest and encouraged Sunday Times readers to follow the proceeding of the war.
