= Terry Southern =

American writer (1924–1995)

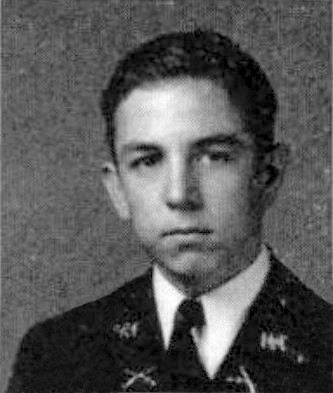
- Southern in the North Texas Agricultural College yearbook, 1940s
- Born: May 1, 1924; Alvarado, Texas, U.S.
- Died: October 29, 1995 (aged 71); New York City, New York, U.S.
- Education: Northwestern University (BA)
- Occupations: Novelist; essayist; screenwriter; lecturer
- Spouse(s): Pud Gadiot (m. 1952; div. 1954) Carol Kauffman (m. 1956; div. 1965)
- Children: Nile Southern
- Writing career
- Notable work: Candy (1958); The Magic Christian (1959); Blue Movie (1970)
- Literary movement: New Journalism

Terry Southern (May 1, 1924 – October 29, 1995) was an American novelist, essayist, screenwriter, and university lecturer, noted for his distinctive satirical style. Part of the Paris postwar literary movement in the 1950s and a companion to Beat writers in Greenwich Village, Southern was also at the center of Swinging London in the 1960s and helped to change the style and substance of American films in the 1970s. He briefly wrote for Saturday Night Live in the 1980s.

Southern's dark and often absurdist style of satire helped to define the sensibilities of several generations of writers, readers, directors, and filmgoers. He is credited by journalist Tom Wolfe as having invented New Journalism with the publication of "Twirling at Ole Miss" in Esquire in February 1963. Southern's reputation was established with the publication of his comic novels Candy and The Magic Christian and through his gift for writing memorable film dialogue, as in Dr. Strangelove, The Loved One, The Cincinnati Kid, and The Magic Christian. His work on Easy Rider helped create the independent film movement of the 1970s.

== Biography ==
Southern was born on May 1, 1924, in Alvarado, Texas. He graduated from Sunset High School in Dallas, Texas, in 1941. He attended North Texas Agricultural College for a year as a pre-med major before transferring to Southern Methodist University, where he continued to cultivate his interest in literature. From 1943 to 1945, he served in the US Army as a demolitions technician during World War II. Stationed in Reading, England, with the 435th Quartermaster Platoon (allowing for frequent forays to London), he earned a Bronze Star and a Good Conduct Medal. In the autumn of 1946, he resumed his studies at the University of Chicago before transferring to Northwestern University, where he received his undergraduate degree in philosophy in 1948.

=== Paris, 1948–1952 ===
Southern left the United States in September 1948, using a G.I. Bill grant to travel to France, where he ostensibly pursued graduate studies at the Faculté Des Lettres of the Sorbonne; as funding was not contingent on the conferral of a degree or certificate, this was a common expedience employed by American bohemians of the era who wished to avail themselves of postwar France's enduringly favorable exchange rate, flourishing illicit markets and comparative dearth of discrimination against African Americans. His four-year stint in Paris was a crucial formative influence, both on his development as a writer and on the evolution of his "hip" persona. During this period he made many important friendships and social contacts as he became a central figure in the expatriate American café society of the 1950s. He became close friends with Mason Hoffenberg (with whom he subsequently co-wrote the novel Candy), Alexander Trocchi, John Marquand, Mordecai Richler, Aram Avakian (filmmaker, photographer and brother of Columbia Records jazz producer George Avakian), and jazz musician and motorsport enthusiast Allen Eager. He also met expatriate American writer James Baldwin and leading French intellectuals Jean Cocteau, Jean-Paul Sartre, and Albert Camus.

Southern frequented the Cinémathèque Française in Paris and saw jazz performances by leading bebop musicians including Charlie Parker, Dizzy Gillespie, Bud Powell, Thelonious Monk, and Miles Davis, evoked in his classic "You're Too Hip, Baby". During the early 1950s he wrote some of his best short stories, including "The Butcher" and "The Automatic Gate", both published in David Burnett's New-Story magazine. His story "The Accident" was the first short story published in the Paris Review in its founding issue (1953); it was followed by "The Sun and the Still-born Stars" in issue #4. Southern became closely identified with the Paris Review and its founders, Peter Matthiessen, Harold L. "Doc" Humes, and George Plimpton, and he formed a lifelong friendship with Plimpton. He met French model Pud Gadiot in 1952; a romance soon blossomed and the couple married just before they moved to New York City.

=== Greenwich Village, 1953–1956 ===
In 1953, Southern and Gadiot returned to the US and settled in Greenwich Village in New York City. As he had in Paris, Southern quickly became a prominent figure on the artistic scene that flourished in the Village in the late 1950s. He met visual artists such as Robert Frank and Larry Rivers. Through Mason Hoffenberg, who made occasional visits from Paris, he was introduced to leading Beat writers including Jack Kerouac, Allen Ginsberg and Gregory Corso.

He frequented renowned New York jazz venues such as the Five Spot, the San Remo, and the Village Vanguard. It was in this period that Southern read and became obsessed with the work of British writer Henry Green. Green's writing exerted a strong influence on Southern's early work, and Green became one of Southern's most ardent early supporters.

Southern struggled to gain recognition during this period, writing short stories as he worked on Flash and Filigree, his first solo novel. Most of these stories were rejected by leading magazines and journals. Here, as in Paris, Southern was almost entirely supported by his wife Pud, but their relationship fell apart within a year of their arrival in New York and they were divorced in mid-1954.

During 1954 and 1955. Southern met two of his literary heroes, William Faulkner and Nelson Algren. Southern interviewed Algren for the Paris Review in the autumn of 1955. They kept in touch after the interview, and Algren became another of Southern's early friends and champions.

Southern's fortunes began to change after he was taken on by the Curtis-Brown Agency in mid-1954; through them he had three of his short stories accepted by Harper's Magazine. It published "The Sun and the Still-born Stars" and "The Panthers" in the same edition in late 1955, and "The Night Bird Blew for Doctor Warner" was featured in the January 1956 edition.

In October 1955, Southern met model, aspiring actress, and editor Carol Kauffman. They were married on July 14, 1956.

=== Geneva, 1956–1959 ===
Southern returned to Europe with Kauffman in October 1956, stopping off in Paris and then settling in Geneva, Switzerland, where they lived until 1959. Kauffman took a job with UNESCO, which supported them as Southern continued to write. The years in Geneva were a prolific period during which he prepared Flash and Filigree for publication, and worked on Candy and The Magic Christian as well as TV scripts and short stories. The couple made trips to Paris, where they visited Mason Hoffenberg, Allen Ginsberg, and William S. Burroughs, and to London, where Southern met Henry Green and Kenneth Tynan.

During his time in New York, Southern had written a short story "about a girl in Greenwich Village who got involved with a hunchback because she was such a good Samaritan" and this became the core of Candy, co-written with Mason Hoffenberg. On his return to Paris in late 1956, Southern showed the story to several people, including Hoffenberg, who thought the character should have more adventures. Southern encouraged Hoffenberg to write one; this became the sequence where Candy goes to the hospital to see Dr. Krankheit. The pair began alternately creating chapters, working together regularly on visits to Tourrettes-sur-Loup over the spring and summer of 1957. The book was introduced to publisher Maurice Girodias, probably by Marilyn Meeske (later Marilyn Meeske Sorel) who, according to Southern, thought Girodias would be interested in it as a "dirty book".

André Deutsch accepted Flash and Filigree, Southern's first novel, early in 1957, and the short story "A South Summer Idyll" was published in Paris Review No. 15. The Southerns spent some time in Spain with Henry Green during the summer, and Southern interviewed him for the Paris Review. Several more short stories were published later that year, by which time he was finishing work on Candy. Southern and Gregory Corso helped convince Girodias to publish the controversial novel Naked Lunch by then-little-known author Burroughs.

In early 1958, Southern made his first foray into screenwriting, working with Canadian director Ted Kotcheff, who had come to Britain to work for the newly established ABC Weekend TV company. Kotcheff directed Southern's TV adaptation of Eugene O'Neill's The Emperor Jones, which was broadcast in the UK in March. This coincided with the publication of Flash and Filigree, which was well-reviewed in the UK but coolly received in the US

The first major magazine interview with Southern, conducted by Elaine Dundy, was published in UK Harper's Bazaar in August 1958. In October, Olympia published Candy under the pseudonym Maxwell Kenton, and it immediately was banned by the Paris vice squad.

The Magic Christian, Southern's first solo novel, satirically explores the corrupting effects of money. He finished the book in Geneva over the fall and winter of 1958–1959. and it was published by André Deutsch in spring 1959 to mixed reviews; however, it soon gained an avid cult following. By the time it had been published, the Southerns had decided to return to the US; they left Geneva for New York in April 1959.

=== East Canaan, 1959–1962 ===
After moving back to the US, the Southerns stayed with friends for several months until they were able to buy their own home. They were looking for a rural retreat close enough to New York to allow Terry to commute there. Southern met and became friendly with jazz musician and bandleader Artie Shaw, and they began looking for properties together. Shaw put down a deposit on a farm in East Canaan, Connecticut, but at the urging of a friend Southern convinced Shaw to let him buy the farm, which he purchased for $23,000.

During 1959 and 1960, he continued working on a never-completed novel titled The Hipsters, which he had begun in Geneva. He became part of the New York artists and writers 'salon' of his old friend Plimpton—who had also moved back to New York— frequenting the Cedar Tavern, rubbing shoulders with writers James Jones, William Styron, Norman Mailer, Philip Roth, Harold "Doc" Humes, Jack Gelber, Jules Feiffer, Blair Fuller, Gore Vidal, Kenneth Tynan, the Aga Khan, the cast of the British comedy stage revue Beyond The Fringe, Jackie Kennedy, British actress Jean Marsh, and Tynan's first wife, Elaine Dundy, through whom Southern met satirist Lenny Bruce.

Flash and Filigree had been published in the US by Coward McCann in the fall of 1958. Several fragments from The Hipsters were published as short stories during this period, including "Red-Dirt Marijuana" published, in the January–February 1960 edition of Evergreen Review; and "Razor Fight", published in Glamour magazine. He had an essay on Lotte Lenya published in Esquire. In early 1960, he began writing book reviews for The Nation, which were published over the next two years. During the year, he collaborated with his old Paris friends Trocchi and Richard Seaver, compiling "Writers in Revolt," an anthology of modern fiction for the Frederick Fall company. The editing process took much longer than expected: A drug bust led Trocchi to flee to the UK via Canada, leaving Southern and Seaver to finish the book, and editor Stephen Levine was recruited to assist.

Terry and Carol's son and only child Nile Southern was born on December 29, 1960. Around this time, Southern began writing for Maurice Girodias' new periodical Olympia Review. He began negotiations with the Putnam company to reissue Candy under his and Hoffenberg's real names, and he hired Sterling Lord as his literary agent, .

In the summer of 1962, Southern worked for two months as a relief editor at Esquire, and during this period, he had several stories published in the magazine, including "The Road to Axotle". Through Esquire, he interviewed rising filmmaker Stanley Kubrick, who had completed his controversial screen adaptation of Vladimir Nabokov's novel Lolita. Although Southern knew little about Kubrick, the director was well aware of Southern's work, having been given a copy of The Magic Christian by Peter Sellers during the making of Lolita.

=== Dr. Strangelove ===
Southern's life and career changed irrevocably on November 2, 1962, when he received a telegram inviting him to come to London to work on the screenplay of Kubrick's new film, which was then in pre-production.

Partly on the recommendation of Peter Sellers, Stanley Kubrick asked Southern to help revise the screenplay of Dr. Strangelove or: How I Learned to Stop Worrying and Love the Bomb (1964). The film was based on the Cold War thriller Red Alert (1958) by Peter George, the rights to which Kubrick had secured for $3,000. Kubrick and George's original screenplay (Edge of Doom) was a straight political thriller. They reworked it into a satirical format (provisionally titled The Delicate Balance of Terror) in which the plot of Red Alert was situated as a film-within-a-film made by an alien intelligence.

Southern's work on the project was brief but intense; he officially worked on the script from November 16 to December 28, 1962. Southern began to rely on the amphetamine-barbiturate "diet pill" Dexamyl to keep him going through the frantic rewriting process; in later years, he developed a long-term amphetamine dependency. His amphetamine abuse, combined with his drinking and other drugs, contributed to health problems in later life.

Southern and Kubrick recast the script as a black comedy, jettisoning the "film within a film". Kubrick, George, and Southern shared the screenplay credits, but competing claims about who contributed what led to confusion and some conflict among the three men after the film's release. The credit question was confused by Sellers' numerous ad-libbed contributions—he often improvised wildly on set, so Kubrick made sure that Sellers had as much camera 'coverage' as possible during his scenes to capture these spontaneous inspirations.

According to Art Miller, an independent producer who hired Southern to write the screenplay for a never-completed comic film about the bumbling Watergate burglars, Southern told him that the best example of his writing in Dr. Strangelove was the scene in which B-52 pilot T. J. "King" Kong, played by Slim Pickens, reads off a list of the contents of a survival kit to his crew, concluding that a man could have "a pretty nice weekend in Vegas" with some of the items. When the scene was shot, Pickens spoke the scripted line ("Dallas"), but the word " Vegas" was overdubbed during post-production because the film was released not long after the assassination of President John F. Kennedy in Dallas in November 1963.

Southern also helped Sellers with dialogue coaching. Originally slated to play four roles, including that of the Texan B-52 bomber pilot Major Kong, the actor had difficulty mastering the accent. Southern, a native Texan, taped himself speaking Kong's lines for Sellers to study. Sellers, who had never been comfortable in the role of Kong, was able to extricate himself from the part after allegedly fracturing his ankle, forcing Kubrick to re-cast. The part went to actor Slim Pickens, who Kubrick had met during his brief stint working on Marlon Brando's One-Eyed Jacks.

After the film went into wider release in January 1964, Southern was the subject of considerable media coverage, and erroneously was given primary credit for the screenplay, a misperception he did little to correct. This reportedly angered Kubrick—who was notorious for his unwillingness to share writing credits—and Peter George, who penned a complaint to Life magazine in response to a lavish photo essay on Southern published in the May 8, 1964 edition. Stung by the article's assertion that Southern was responsible for turning the formerly "serious script" into an "original irreverent satirical film", George pointed out that he and Kubrick had been working together on the script for ten months, whereas Southern was only "briefly employed (November 16 – December 28, 1962) to do some additional writing".

Toward the end of his work on Dr. Strangelove, Southern began canvassing for more film work. Jobs he considered included a proposed John Schlesinger screen adaptation of the Iris Murdoch novel A Severed Head, and a project called The Marriage Game, to be directed by Peter Yates and produced by the James Bond team of Harry Saltzman and Cubby Broccoli. He also wrote an essay on John Fowles' novel The Collector, which led to his work as a "script doctor" on the subsequent screen version.

Southern's writing career took off in 1963. His essay "Twirlin' at Ole Miss" was published in Esquire in February 1963, and this work of satirical reportage is now acknowledged as one of the cornerstone works of New Journalism. This was quickly followed by the publication of several other essays, including the Bay of Pigs-themed "Recruiting for the Big Parade", and one of his best Paris stories, "You're Too Hip, Baby". The fiction anthology Writers In Revolt was published in the spring, soon followed by the US publication of Candy, which became the #2 American fiction best-seller of 1963.

=== "The Big Time", 1964–1970 ===
The success of Dr. Strangelove and the re-published version of Candy was the turning point in Southern's career, making him one of the most celebrated writers of his day. In the words of biographer Lee Hill, Southern spent the next six years in "an Olympian realm of glamour, money, constant motion and excitement", mixing and working with international literary, film, music, and TV stars. His work on Dr. Strangelove opened the doors to lucrative work as a screenwriter and script doctor, and allowed him to greatly increase his fee, from the reported $2,000 he received for Dr. Strangelove to as much as $100,000 thereafter.

During the latter half of the 1960s, Southern worked on the screenplays of a string of "cult" films. His credits in this period include The Loved One (1965), The Collector (1965), The Cincinnati Kid (1965), Casino Royale (1967), Barbarella (1968), Easy Rider (1969), The Magic Christian (1969), and End of the Road (1970).

==== The Loved One, The Cincinnati Kid ====
In early 1964, Southern was hired to collaborate with British author Christopher Isherwood on a screen adaptation of Evelyn Waugh's satirical novel The Loved One, directed by British director Tony Richardson. When filming was postponed in the spring of 1964, Southern returned to East Canaan and continued work on a rewrite of the script for the film version of John Fowles' The Collector but he eventually withdrew from the project because he disagreed with the change to the story's ending.

In August 1964, the Southerns moved to Los Angeles, where Terry began work on the screenplay of The Loved One, for which MGM/Filmways paid him $3,000 per month. Southern's work and his networking and socializing brought him into contact with many Hollywood stars, including Ben Gazzara, Jennifer Jones, Janice Rule, George Segal, Richard Benjamin, James Coburn, Peter Fonda, and Dennis Hopper and his wife Brooke Hayward. Hopper, a fan and collector of modern art, later introduced Southern to British gallery owner and art dealer Robert Fraser.

Not long after arriving in Los Angeles, Southern met Gail Gerber, a young Canadian-born actress and dancer, on the MGM backlot. Gerber, who used the stage name Gail Gilmore, was working as a dancer on an Elvis Presley movie, and she had a non-speaking role in The Loved One. Southern and Gerber soon began an affair. The relationship intensified during July and August 1964, and after Southern's wife and son went back to East Canaan, Southern and Gerber moved in together in a suite at the Chateau Marmont hotel. He and Kauffman were divorced in 1965.

Working with Richardson and Isherwood, Southern turned Waugh's novel into "an all-out attack on Hollywood, consumerism, and the hypocrisies surrounding man's fear of death". Southern also wrote the text for a souvenir book, which featured photos by William Claxton. Work on the film continued through most of 1965, with Southern and Gerber spending much of their leisure time with their newfound film star friends in Malibu, California. Loved One co-producer John Calley was a frequent visitor to Southern's Chateau Marmont suite, and he hired Southern to work on several subsequent Filmways projects, including The Cincinnati Kid and Don't Make Waves.

Soon after the principal shooting on The Loved One was concluded, Southern began work on the script of The Cincinnati Kid, which starred Steve McQueen. He was one of several writers who had worked on versions of the screenplay, including Paddy Chayefsky, George Good, and Ring Lardner Jr. Original director Sam Peckinpah was fired one week into shooting, allegedly because he shot unauthorized nude scenes. (He did not make another film until 1969's The Wild Bunch.) He was replaced by Norman Jewison, and during his work on this production, Southern began a friendship with cast member Rip Torn.

==== Casino Royale, Barbarella, Candy ====
By 1966, the film adaptations of Ian Fleming's James Bond series, produced by Albert R. Broccoli and Harry Saltzman, had become a successful and popular film franchise. The rights to Fleming's first Bond novel Casino Royale had been secured by rival producer Charles K. Feldman. He had attempted to get Casino Royale made as an Eon Productions James Bond film, but Broccoli and Saltzman turned him down. Believing he could not compete with the Eon series, Feldman then decided to shoot the film as a parody, not only of James Bond but of the entire spy fiction genre. The casino segment featuring Peter Sellers and Orson Welles is the only portion based upon the novel.

Southern and Gail Gerber moved to London in early 1966, when Southern was hired to work on the screenplay of Casino Royale. The episodic "quasi-psychedelic burlesque" proved to be a chaotic production, stitched together from segments variously directed or co-directed by a team that included Joseph McGrath, Robert Parrish, Val Guest, John Huston, Richard Talmadge, and Ken Hughes. Many planned scenes could not be filmed due to the feud between Orson Welles and star Peter Sellers, which climaxed with Sellers walking out during the filming of the casino scenes and refusing to return. Many writers contributed to the screenplay, including Southern (who wrote most of the dialogue for Sellers), Woody Allen, Wolf Mankowitz, Michael Sayers, Frank Buxton, Joseph Heller, Ben Hecht, Mickey Rose, and Billy Wilder.

Southern had been introduced to Robert Fraser by Dennis Hopper, and when he went to London to work on Casino Royale he and Gail became part of Fraser's "jet-set" salon that included the Beatles, the Rolling Stones, photographer Michael Cooper, interior designer Christopher Gibbs, model-actress Anita Pallenberg, film maker Nicolas Roeg, painter Francis Bacon, producer Sandy Lieberson, Guinness heir Tara Browne, and model Donyale Luna. Southern became close friends with photographer Michael Cooper, who was part of the Rolling Stones' inner circle and who shot the cover photos for the Beatles' Sgt Pepper's Lonely Hearts Club Band LP.

Southern attended the Cannes Film Festival in the spring of 1966, where he met Andy Warhol and Gerard Malanga, and he remained in touch with Malanga for many years. On his return to London, he continued to work on the Casino Royale screenplay and a screen adaptation of The Magic Christian for Peter Sellers, who was planning his film version. Sandy Lieberson optioned Southern's first novel Flash and Filigree and United Artists optioned Candy. Michael Cooper also introduced Southern to the Anthony Burgess novel A Clockwork Orange, and Southern later encouraged Stanley Kubrick to make his film version of the book after MGM refused to back Kubrick's planned film on Napoleon. Southern and Cooper then began to plan a film adaptation of the novel, to star Mick Jagger and The Rolling Stones as Alex and his gang of droogs.

Through Si Litvinoff, Southern optioned the book for the bargain price of $1,000 (against a final price of $10,000), and Lieberson and David Puttnam set up a development deal with Paramount, who underwrote a draft by Southern and Cooper. David Hemmings was briefly considered for the role of Alex—much to the chagrin of Cooper and the Stones—and the director's chair was initially offered to Richard Lester, who turned it down. Southern's old friend Ted Kotcheff was then approached, but at this point, the project stalled – under the British censorship regulations, the treatment had to be submitted to the Lord Chamberlain, who returned it, unread, with a note attached that said: "I know this book and there is no way you can make a movie of it. It deals with youthful incitement, which is illegal." As a result, Paramount put it into 'turnaround' and it was eventually picked up by Kubrick three years later.

During the frequent interruptions during the filming of Casino Royale, Filmways hired Southern to do a "tightening and brightening" job on the screenplay of the occult thriller Eye of the Devil, which starred David Niven and featured Sharon Tate in her first film role. Through the winter of 1966–1967 he also began work on the screenplay for Roger Vadim's Barbarella, and he contributed to a TV version of The Desperate Hours directed by Ted Kotcheff and starring George Segal and Yvette Mimieux.

The June 1, 1967, release of Sgt Pepper's Lonely Hearts Club Band gave Southern pop-culture immortality, thanks to his photograph being included (on the recommendation of Ringo Starr) on the album's front-cover collage, which was photographed by Cooper. Soon after, a collection of his short writing Red-Dirt Marijuana and Other Tastes, was published in the US. It received favorable reviews from critics, and the cover blurb featured a highly complimentary quote from Gore Vidal, who described Southern as "the most profoundly witty writer of our generation".

Work on Barbarella continued through to late 1967, and Southern convinced Vadim to cast his friend Anita Pallenberg in the role of the Black Queen. In December 1967 the film version of Candy began shooting in Rome with director Christian Marquand. It starred newcomer Ewa Aulin in the title role and like Casino Royale it featured a host of stars in cameos, including Richard Burton, Marlon Brando, John Astin, Ringo Starr, Walter Matthau, and Anita Pallenberg.

The original screenplay by Southern was rewritten by Buck Henry (who also has an uncredited cameo in the film). Like Casino Royale, it proved to be a chaotic production and failed to live up to expectations; it was generally panned by critics on its release in December 1968 and its impact was further weakened by the financial collapse of its main backer.

==== Easy Rider, The End Of The Road ====
As production on Barbarella finished in October 1967, director Roger Vadim began shooting his episode of the omnibus film Spirits of the Dead, which co-starred Peter Fonda and Vadim's wife Jane Fonda. It was during the making of this film that Peter Fonda told Southern of his desire to make a 'modern Western' in which motorbike riders substituted for cowboys, a concept that had been largely inspired by the success of Roger Corman's influential low-budget "exploitation" biker films The Wild Angels (1966) and its follow-ups, in which Fonda and his friend Dennis Hopper had featured. Fonda pitched his idea to Hopper on his return to America, and Southern added his weight to the project, agreeing to work on the script for scale ($350 per week).

Southern, Fonda, and Hopper met in New York City in November 1967 to develop their ideas. These brainstorming sessions formed the basis of the screenplay that Southern wrote from December 1967 to April 1968. On the basis of Southern's treatment, Raybert Productions, which had produced the TV series The Monkees and the Monkees movie Head, agreed to finance the film with a budget of US$350,000 (in return for one-third of the profits), with Columbia Pictures agreeing to distribute the film.

Southern eventually shared the writing credit with Hopper and Fonda, but there has been some dispute over their contributions to the screenplay. Hopper and Fonda later tried to downplay Southern's input, claiming that many sections of the film (such as the graveyard scene and the Mardi Gras sequence) had been improvised, whereas others involved in the production (including Southern) have asserted that most of these scenes were fully scripted and primarily written by him.

Although the basic concept for the film was Fonda's, the title Easy Rider was provided by Southern (it is a slang term from the American South for a prostitute's lover who lives off her) and Southern wrote several early drafts of the screenplay. During the production, Southern became concerned at Hopper and Fonda's replacement of his writing by what he described as "dumb-bell dialogue", and more of the material Southern wrote for the main characters was cut out during the editing process. Also, Fonda and Hopper mostly improvised a great deal as they filmed.

Southern had originally written the character of the small-town lawyer (played by Jack Nicholson) with his friend Rip Torn in mind, but Torn dropped out of the project after an altercation with Hopper in a New York restaurant, in which the two actors almost came to blows.

Southern continued to work on other projects while Easy Rider began shooting—he completed his next novel Blue Movie; began working with the painter Larry Rivers on a book project The Donkey and The Darling; he worked on the final drafts of the screenplay for The Magic Christian, and he began discussions with Aram Avakian about a movie project called The End of the Road.

In the summer 1968, he was approached by Esquire magazine to cover the 1968 Democratic National Convention in Chicago. Southern attended the event with Burroughs, Jean Genet (a last-minute substitute for Samuel Beckett), and John Sack, and his friend Michael Cooper took photographs; Southern and friends were present when peaceful demonstrations erupted into savage violence after protesters were attacked by police. Southern's essay on the event was his last work published by Esquire.

The editing of Easy Rider continued for months, as Hopper and Fonda argued over the final form. Hopper ditched a planned score by Crosby, Stills, Nash & Young and returned to the group of songs he had used for the rough cut, which included music by The Byrds, Jimi Hendrix, and Steppenwolf. Easy Rider caused a sensation when it was screened in Cannes and it went on to become the fourth highest-grossing American film of 1969, taking $19 million, and receiving two Academy Award nominations. Although it brought Hopper and Fonda great financial and artistic rewards and helped to open up the Hollywood 'system' for young independent producers, little of the profit was shared with Southern, and the true extent of his contributions was repeatedly downplayed by the other principals.

Southern's next major screenplay was The End of the Road, adapted from the novel by John Barth and starring Stacy Keach, Dorothy Tristan and James Earl Jones. It was directed by his friend Aram Avakian. The director and the film were the subject of a major spread in Life magazine in November 1969, which reportedly led to a critical backlash, and the film was savaged on its release and was especially criticized because of a graphic scene in which the main female character undergoes an abortion, which led to the film being classified with an "X" rating.

==== The Magic Christian ====
The Magic Christian was one of Peter Sellers' favorite books—his gift of a copy to Stanley Kubrick led to Southern being hired for Dr. Strangelove—and a film version of the book had long been a dream project for the actor, who intended to play the lead role of Guy Grand. In 1968 Southern was hired for the production and he worked on a dozen drafts of the screenplay. Sellers also tinkered with it while Southern was working on The End of the Road. At Sellers' request, a draft by Southern and director Joseph McGrath was re-written by Graham Chapman and John Cleese, two young British TV comedy writers who soon became famous as members of the Monty Python team. Cleese later described McGrath as having "no idea of comedy structure" and complained that the film ended up as "a series of celebrity walk-ons".

The film was shot in London between February and May 1969. The cast was headed by Sellers (as Guy Grand) and Ringo Starr as his son Youngman Grand (a new character created for the movie), with cameos by Spike Milligan, Christopher Lee, Laurence Harvey, Raquel Welch, Roman Polanski and Yul Brynner. As with Dr. Strangelove, Sellers habitually improvised on the script during filming. During production McGrath and Southern discussed a project based on the life of gangster Dutch Schultz, to be made in collaboration with Burroughs and Trocchi, but nothing came of it.

The Magic Christian ends with a scene in which Grand fills a huge vat with offal and excrement and then throws money into the fetid mixture to demonstrate how far people will go to get money for nothing. The original plan was to film the climactic scene at the Statue of Liberty in New York, and the US National Park Service agreed to the request. Sellers, McGrath and Southern then traveled to New York on the Queen Elizabeth 2 (at a reported cost of $10,000 per person) but the studio then refused to pay for the shoot and it had to be moved to London. The scene was eventually shot on the South Bank, near the site of the new National Theatre building. The film premiered on February 12, 1970, to lukewarm reviews.

=== Later career ===
Southern's pre-eminence waned rapidly in the 1970s—his screen credits decreased, his book and story output dwindled, and he acquired a reputation as an out-of-control substance abuser. He continued to drink heavily and take various drugs; in particular, his dependence on Dexamyl badly affected his health as he aged. Southern's biographer, Lee Hill, suggests that Southern was a functioning alcoholic and that his image was largely based on his occasional public appearances in New York, partying and socializing; in private, he remained a tireless worker. His later career was complicated by financial woes. In the late 1960s, Southern's spendthrift ways and lack of financial acumen led him into trouble and he was audited by the IRS on several occasions beginning in 1972, resulting in big tax bills and penalties. Tax problems dogged him for the rest of his life. In 1968, he signed the "Writers and Editors War Tax Protest" pledge, vowing to refuse tax payments in protest against the Vietnam War.

As revealed by documents released under the Freedom of Information Act, Southern and his wife Carol had been put under surveillance by the FBI starting in 1965. In a 2000 article, Burroughs intimate Victor Bockris (who profiled Southern for Interview) speculated that this surveillance and Southern's "IRS harassment" (a strategy concurrently employed by the Nixon administration against the more fiscally sound Andy Warhol and Robert Rauschenberg) left him blacklisted by Hollywood, although perceived betrayals from such putatively close friends as Hoffenberg and Hopper vis-à-vis his longstanding history of substance abuse and tangible opportunities in other media may have played the catalytic role in eroding Southern's efficacy as a writer.

==== 1970s ====
In December 1970, Southern found himself in the position of having to beg Dennis Hopper for a profit point on Easy Rider—a request Hopper refused. Southern's tenuous financial position was in contrast to that of his creative partners, who became wealthy thanks to the film's commercial success. For the rest of his life, Southern was repeatedly forced to take on work to pay tax bills and penalties, and on many occasions he struggled to keep up the mortgage payments on the East Canaan farm. Blue Movie was published in the fall of 1970, with a dedication to Stanley Kubrick. It received only moderate reviews, and sales were hampered by the refusal of the New York Times to run ads for the book.

Southern worked on many screenplays in the aftermath of Easy Rider, including God Is Love, DJ (based on a book by Norman Mailer), Hand-Painted Hearts (based on a story by Thomas Baum), and Drift with Tony Goodstone. While Fonda and Hopper continued to assert that much of Easy Rider had been improvised, Southern remained largely silent about his role, although he was prompted to write a letter to the New York Times to counter a claim that Jack Nicholson had improvised his speech during the film's campfire scene.

Terry and Carol Southern remained on good terms and Southern continued to support and help raise their son Nile. The IRS investigations had also affected Carol, who had an inheritance from her late father seized as part of Terry's tax settlement. She later became an editor with Crown Publishing, and married critic Alexander Keneas. Southern's other unrealized projects during this period included an adaptation of Nathanael West's A Cool Million, and a screenplay called Merlin, based on Arthurian legend, which was written with Mick Jagger in mind for the lead role.

Southern covered the Rolling Stones 1972 American Tour, where he met and began a collaboration with Peter Beard, and they worked sporadically on the never-filmed screenplay The End of the Game until Southern's death. Southern immersed himself in the bacchanalian atmosphere of the tour, and his essay on the Stones tour, "Riding The Lapping Tongue", was published in the August 12, 1972, edition of Saturday Review. He also wrote a bawdy anti-Nixon sketch which was performed at a George McGovern fundraiser, and "Twirlin' at Ole Miss" was included in The New Journalism.

Because of his acute money problems (exacerbated by the IRS affair), Southern took an adjunct lectureship in screen writing at New York University, where he taught from the fall of 1972 to the spring of 1974; although popular among students, he was ultimately dismissed for holding his classes in a local bar. His students included Amy Heckerling (who directed Fast Times at Ridgemont High and Clueless), literary agent Nancy Nigrosh, and Hollywood biographer Lee Server. Southern began writing for National Lampoon in November 1972 and served on the jury at the 1972 New York Erotic Film Festival with Burroughs, Gore Vidal, and Sylvia Miles.

In a 1973 Playboy profile, Mason Hoffenberg (who had conquered his heroin addiction with methadone maintenance and was fraternizing in alcoholic codependency with Richard Manuel of The Band near Woodstock, New York) claimed that "everything went right for Southern... he was ejaculated to fame and screenplays" and "Terry Southern is a good rewriter and he writes some funny shit himself, but he always grabs top billing"; in an ensuing defamation suit between the erstwhile collaborators, Southern alleged that Hoffenberg's representation had cost him several screenwriting jobs.

In 1973, Southern wrote a new screenplay called Double Date, which in some respects anticipated the later David Cronenberg film Dead Ringers, but he eventually abandoned it. In early 1974, influential Warner Bros. producer John Calley hired Southern to adapt Blue Movie for the screen; although Mike Nichols was slated to direct, the deal eventually fell apart due to a protracted dispute between Warners and Ringo Starr, who then owned the screen rights.

A new short story, "Fixing Up Ert", was published in the September 1974 edition of Oui magazine, and around this time Norwegian director Ingmar Ejve hired Southern to write a screenplay based on the Carl-Henning Wijkmark novel The Hunters of Karin Hall. His friend Ted Kotcheff hired Southern to write the screenplay for the Watergate-themed project A Piece of Bloody Cake, but he was unable to get the script approved.

Southern's only screen credit during the 1970s was the teleplay Stop Thief!, written for the TV miniseries The American Parade (based on the life of 19th Century American political cartoonist Thomas Nast). Southern once again accompanied the Rolling Stones on their Tour of the Americas '75 and contributed text to a commemorative 1978 coffee table book (The Rolling Stones On Tour) featuring photographs by Annie Leibovitz and Christopher Sykes.

In the summer of 1976, Southern visited Rip Torn in New Mexico during the making of Nicolas Roeg's film version of The Man Who Fell to Earth. He made a cameo in the crowd in the scene where Newton is arrested just before he boards his spacecraft. Roeg used an excerpt from The End of the Road on one of the TV screens, in the scene in which Newton watches multiple TV sets at the same time.

In 1977 and 1978 Southern was embroiled in a lengthy and chaotic attempt to make a film version of Burroughs' novel Junkie, but the project collapsed due to the erratic behavior of its principal backer, Jules Stein. In August 1978 Southern wrote a skit called "Haven Can Wait" that was performed by Jon Voight, Allen Ginsberg, Bobby Seale, and Rip Torn at a benefit for Abbie Hoffman.

Another unsuccessful project from this period was his work for Si Litvinoff on the screenplay for the opera drama Aria. Southern's script was considered 'below par' and was rejected by Fox. At the decade's end, a new story was published in the 20th-anniversary issue of the Paris Review and Blue Movie was optioned once again by Andrew Braunsberg.

Southern read from a work in progress ("Vignette of Idealistic Life in South Texas") at the Nova Convention (a symposium in Burroughs' honor organized by academic Sylvere Lotringer at the East Village's Entermedia Theater in November 1978), opening the second night on a bill that included Philip Glass, Brion Gysin, John Giorno, Patti Smith, and Burroughs.

Although he continued to proudly reside in northern Connecticut "beyond the commuter belt", Southern maintained his social life in New York with diligence; his girlfriend Gail Gerber often drove him to Studio 54 (where he cultivated a convivial acquaintance with co-owner Steve Rubell), parties hosted by George Plimpton and other engagements; when day trips were not feasible or undesired, he would typically stay at Larry Rivers's block-long loft at 404 East 14th Street in the East Village, with Gerber characterizing Rivers as Southern's best friend by this juncture.

Following the critical and commercial success of Being There (1979), Peter Sellers had a chance meeting with an arms dealer during an air flight that inspired him to contact Southern and ask him to write a script on the subject of the shady world of the international arms trade. The resulting screenplay, Grossing Out, was reputed to have been of high quality, and Hal Ashby was provisionally attached as director, but the project went into limbo after Sellers' sudden death from a heart attack on 24 July 1980.

==== 1980s ====
Under the pseudonym of Norwood Pratt, Southern co-wrote the 1980 sci fi-themed hardcore pornographic film Randy: The Electric Lady; the director, Philip Schuman, had adapted "Red Dirt" into an award-winning short. A year later, he was hired by Saturday Night Live head writer Michael O'Donoghue (who had solicited contributions from Southern as editor of National Lampoon a decade earlier) to write for the 1981–1982 series of the NBC show in his efforts to revitalize the foundering sketch comedy program. This controversial period, which started with Lorne Michaels and the remnants of his "Not Ready for Primetime" cast leaving the show, followed by Jean Doumanian being picked as the new show runner for season six and the negative reception that followed, and the subsequent firing of Doumanian and her cast (barring Eddie Murphy and Joe Piscopo) and Dick Ebersol being hired to salvage the show (with NBC executives having little faith that Saturday Night Live would be brought back to its former glory), is widely regarded as the lowest point of the series' history. According to Carol Southern, it was "the only job he ever held". Despite his longstanding acquaintance with O'Donoghue and his penchant for the alcohol, cocaine and cannabis that flowed liberally backstage, Southern had trouble fitting in stylistically with the younger writers; many of his ideas and sketches were rejected by the staff and new producer Dick Ebersol for being too subtle, sexually gratuitous, or overly political.

Southern facilitated the booking of Miles Davis as musical guest for the October 17 show in support of The Man with the Horn (a significant public appearance following the trumpeter's 1975–1980 retirement) and arranged for Burroughs—who read selections from his oeuvre at a desk—to appear as a guest performer during the November 7 episode; it was the writer's first appearance on a national US television network. Southern was retained as a writer for the remainder of the season after O'Donoghue — who frequently clashed with the network and Ebersol — was fired from the series.

Southern's involvement with the show led to a bona fide collaboration with fellow SNL alum Nelson Lyon, who had previously added the unproductive Southern's name to his sketches in a gesture of magnanimity. They developed a project set in and around The Cotton Club in the 1930s, but it was eventually abandoned after Francis Ford Coppola and Robert Evans's similarly themed film went into production.

During 1982–1983 Southern worked with Kubrick's former production partner James B. Harris on a naval drama called The Gold Crew (later retitled Floaters), but Southern was diverted from this when he began working with Larry Rivers on an independent film project called At Z Beach. In April 1983, he was approached to work on a planned sequel to Easy Rider called Biker Heaven. He had little to do with the script, but he was paid about $20,000, which was several times more than he had earned from the original. Around this time Stanley Kubrick requested some sample dialogue for a planned film adaptation of Arthur Schnitzler's book Traumnovelle which was to star Steve Martin, but Southern's ribald submissions reportedly sabotaged any prospect of further involvement; Kubrick eventually made the film (as Eyes Wide Shut, with Tom Cruise and Nicole Kidman) shortly before his death in 1999.

A new story by Southern was published in High Times in May 1983. Shortly thereafter, Hopper invited Southern to work on a planned biographical film of Jim Morrison which was to be backed by publisher Larry Flynt. Because Flynt did not own the screen rights to Morrison's story, the project collapsed; Flynt continued to retain Southern as head speechwriter for his ersatz 1984 presidential campaign.

Southern turned 60 in 1984, and his career continued to alternate between promise and disappointment. Flash and Filigree was reissued by Arbor House with a new introduction by Burroughs, and Sandy Lieberson (now at Fox) hired him to work on a script called Intensive Heat, based on the life of jewel thief Albie Baker. During this period, Southern ran into problems with his long-overdue new book (a bildungsroman inspired by his Texas childhood alternatively known as Youngblood, Southern Idyll and Behind the Grassy Knoll) when Putnam demanded the return of the $20,000 advance, precipitating his abandonment of the work. In 1985, Candy and The Magic Christian were reprinted by Penguin and Southern featured prominently in the Howard Brookner documentary Burroughs.

==== 1985: Hawkeye ====
In October 1985 Southern was appointed as one of the directors of Hawkeye, a production company set up by his friend Harry Nilsson to oversee the various film and multimedia projects in which he was involved. Southern and Nilsson collaborated on several screenplays, including Obits, a Citizen Kane-style story about a journalist investigating the subject of a newspaper obituary, but the script was scathingly reviewed by a studio reader and was never given approval.

The only big Hawkeye project to see the light of day was The Telephone. Essentially a one-handed comedy-drama, it depicted the gradual mental disintegration of an out-of-work actor. It was written with Robin Williams in mind but Williams turned it down. Nilsson and Southern then learned that comedian Whoopi Goldberg was keen to take the part and she asked Nilsson and Southern to rewrite it for her. New World Films agreed to produce it and Rip Torn signed on as director.

Production began in January 1987, but New World allowed Goldberg to improvise freely on the screenplay. She also replaced Torn's chosen DOP John Alonzo with her husband David Claessen. Torn battled with Goldberg and reportedly had to beg her to perform takes that stuck to the script. A year-long struggle then ensued between Hawkeye and New World/Goldberg over the rights to the final cut. Southern and Torn put together their own version, which screened at the Sundance Film Festival in January 1988; New World's version premiered in cinemas later that month to generally poor reviews.

The steady salary from Hawkeye was a considerable help to the perennially cash-strapped Southern, but this changed abruptly in late 1989 when Hawkeye folded, after Nilsson discovered that secretary-treasurer Cindy Sims had embezzled all the company funds and most of the money Nilsson had earned from his music, leaving him virtually penniless. At this point, Southern still owed the IRS some $30,000 in back taxes and $40,000 in penalties.

Apart from The Telephone, Southern's only published new output in the period 1985–1990 was the liner notes for the Marianne Faithfull album Strange Weather and a commentary on the Iran–Contra scandal in The Nation.

=== Last years ===
In February 1989 Southern was admitted to the Memorial Sloan Kettering Hospital, where he underwent surgery for stomach cancer. Soon after the surgery, he was interviewed by Mike Golden, and excerpts were published in Reflex, Creative Writer, and Paris Review. After he recovered from his surgery, Southern collaborated with cartoonist R. O. Blechman on a project called Billionaire's Ball, based on the life of Howard Hughes.

Southern landed a job teaching at the Sundance Screenwriters Lab in the summer of 1989. He also assisted with the preparation and publication of Blinds and Shutters, a book on the photography of his late friend Michael Cooper, edited by Perry Richardson and published in a limited edition of 2000, with copies signed by Paul McCartney, Keith Richards, and Allen Ginsberg.

Southern met briefly with Canadian filmmaker David Cronenberg to discuss his forthcoming adaptation of Burroughs' Naked Lunch, but the meeting was unsuccessful and he had no further involvement in the project, Cronenberg writing the script. In November 1989, a conversation with Victor Bockris was published in Interview. His profile was given another small boost by the re-publication of Red-Dirt Marijuana and Other Tastes in 1990.

With encouragement from his son Nile, Southern returned to his long-shelved Texas novel. Retitled Texas Summer, it was published in 1992 by Richard Seaver. Southern's last two articles were published during 1991; a piece on the Texas band ZZ Top appeared in the February edition of Spin, and an article on the Gulf War appeared in The Nation on July 8. During the year Southern was also invited to teach screenwriting at Columbia University's School of the Arts and School of General Studies as an adjunct professor, where he worked until his death.

In 1992, he collaborated with Joseph McGrath on a screenplay Starlets (later retitled Festival), which satirized the Cannes Film Festival. Peter Fonda reportedly tried to prevail on Southern to give up any claim on Easy Rider in exchange for a payment of $30,000 but Southern refused. Southern also assisted Perry Richardson with another book based on Michael Cooper's photography, The Early Stones, which was published late in the year.

Southern's health deteriorated in the last two years of his life, and he suffered a mild stroke in November 1992. In February 1993, he made his last visit home to Texas, where he attended a commemorative screening of Dr. Strangelove and The Magic Christian at the Dallas Museum of Art. During 1994, he recorded readings from his works for a projected tribute project coordinated by producer Hal Willner and Nelson Lyon, but the recording process was complicated by Southern's fragile health and the project remained unreleased until recently. Southern's friend Harry Nilsson died of a heart attack in January 1994. Later that year, he was commissioned by Little, Brown to write a memoir, but only two chapters were completed.

In September 1995, Southern received the Gotham Award for lifetime achievement by the Independent Film Producers Association at the age of 71. The Easy Rider controversy reared its head again shortly before Southern's death when Dennis Hopper alleged during an interview on The Tonight Show with Jay Leno that Rip Torn had been replaced because he had pulled a knife on Hopper during their argument in New York in 1968. Torn sued Hopper over the remark, and Southern agreed to testify on Torn's behalf. The case brought to light several of Southern's drafts of the Easy Rider screenplay, which ended the dispute over his contributions.

In 1995, shortly before his death, Southern hired a new agent and began making arrangements for the republication of Candy and The Magic Christian by Grove. His final project was the text for a 1996 coffee table book about Virgin Records. He appeared at the Yale Summer Writing Program mid-year. Franz Douskey, a creative writer at Yale, told a reporter from the Yale Daily News that Southern was giving a non-lecture, trying to gasp through calcified lungs. In October, he made his last media appearance when he was interviewed for a documentary on cult Scottish novelist Trocchi.

On October 25, 1995, Southern collapsed on the steps of Columbia's Dodge Hall while en route to his class. He was taken to the adjacent St. Luke's Hospital, where he died four days later of respiratory failure. According to Bruce Jay Friedman, Southern's final words were "What's the delay?"

In early 2003, Southern's archives of manuscripts, correspondence, and photographs were acquired by the New York Public Library. The archives include correspondence and other items from George Plimpton, Allen Ginsberg, Norman Mailer, Frank O'Hara, Larry Rivers, William Styron, V. S. Pritchett, Gore Vidal, Abbie Hoffman, and Edmund Wilson, as well as John Lennon, Ringo Starr, and the Rolling Stones. A film adaptation of Southern's 1970 novel Blue Movie was (at some point) "currently" in production from director Michael Dowse and producer Marc Toberoff, to be released by Vertigo Films.

== Works ==
=== Books ===
- Flash and Filigree (1958)
- Candy (with Mason Hoffenberg) (1958)
- The Magic Christian (1959)
- Red-Dirt Marijuana and Other Tastes (1967)
- Blue Movie (1970)
- Texas Summer (1992)
- Virgin: A History of Virgin Records. Axminster, Devon, England: A Publishing Company. 1996. ISBN 978-1-899116-00-3.
- Now Dig This: The Unspeakable Writings of Terry Southern, 1950–1995 (2001)

=== Screenplays ===
- Dr. Strangelove (with Stanley Kubrick and Peter George) (1964)
- The Loved One (with Christopher Isherwood) (1965)
- The Collector (with John Kohn and Stanley Mann; uncredited) (1965)
- The Cincinnati Kid (with Ring Lardner Jr.) (1966)
- Casino Royale (1967) (with John Law, Wolf Mankowitz and Michael Sayers; uncredited)
- Barbarella (with Roger Vadim, Claude Brule, Vittorio Bonicelli, Clement Biddle Wood, Brian Degas and Tudor Gates) (1968)
- Easy Rider (with Peter Fonda and Dennis Hopper) (1969)
- The End of the Road (with Dennis McGuire and Aram Avakian) (1969)
- The Magic Christian (with Joseph McGrath) (1969)
- The Telephone (with Harry Nilsson) (1988)

== Awards and nominations ==
- 1963 O. Henry Award; "The Road Out of Axotle", published in Esquire, August 1962
- 1964 Writers Guild of America; Screenwriter's Award for Best Written American Comedy of 1964, for Dr. Strangelove
- 1964 Academy Award nomination for Best Adapted Screenplay for Dr. Strangelove
- 1965 Hugo Award for Best Dramatic Presentation for Dr. Strangelove
- 1969 Academy Award nomination for Best Original Screenplay; Easy Rider (with Peter Fonda and Dennis Hopper)
- 1975 The Paris Review; Funniest Story of the Year; "Heavy Put-Away, or, A Hustle Not Devoid of a Certain Grossness, Granted"
- 1994 Gotham Award; Writer Award
