= The New Journalism =

1973 book by Tom Wolfe and E. W. Johnson

- First edition
- Editors: Tom Wolfe and E. W. Johnson
- Language: English
- Subject: New Journalism
- Genre: Nonfiction
- Publisher: Harper & Row
- Publication date: 1973
- Publication place: United States
- Pages: 394 (first edition)
- ISBN: 0-06-047183-2

The New Journalism is a 1973 anthology of journalism edited by Tom Wolfe and E. W. Johnson. The book is both a manifesto for a new type of journalism by Wolfe, and a collection of examples of New Journalism by American writers, covering a variety of subjects from the frivolous (baton twirling competitions) to the deadly serious (the Vietnam War). The pieces are notable because they do not conform to the standard dispassionate and even-handed model of journalism. Rather, they incorporate literary devices usually only found in fictional works.

== Manifesto ==
The first section of the book consists of four previously published texts by Wolfe: The Feature Game and Like a Novel (published as The Birth of "The New Journalism": An Eyewitness Report and The New Journalism: A la Recherche des Whichy Thickets, in New York magazine, on February 14 and February 21, 1972); Seizing the Power and Appendix (published as Why They Aren't Writing the Great American Novel Anymore, in Esquire, December 1972).

The text is a diatribe against the American novel which Wolfe sees as having hit a dead end by moving away from realism, and his opinion that journalism is much more relevant. In effect, his manifesto is for mixing journalism with literary techniques to document in a more effective way than the novel. These techniques were most likely inspired by writers of social realism, such as Émile Zola and Charles Dickens. His manifesto for New Journalism (although he had no great affection for the term) has four main points.

- Scene by scene construction. Rather than rely on second-hand accounts and background information, Wolfe considers it necessary for the journalist to witness events first hand, and to recreate them for the reader.
- Dialogue. By recording dialogue as fully as possible, the journalist is not only reporting words, but defining and establishing character, as well as involving the reader.
- The third person. Instead of simply reporting the facts, the journalist has to give the reader a real feeling of the events and people involved. One technique for achieving this is to treat the protagonists like characters in a novel. What is their motivation? What are they thinking?
- Status details. Just as important as the characters and the events, are the surroundings, specifically what people surround themselves with. Wolfe describes these items as the tools for a "social autopsy", so we can see people as they see themselves.

== Anthology ==
Part two, which makes up the major part of The New Journalism, consists of twenty-four pieces, collected by Wolfe and Johnson. Every text features a short introduction, written by Wolfe.

=== Texts ===
Title	Author	First published	Magazine/newspaper first published in	Book published in
Excerpt from In Cold Blood	Truman Capote	September 25, 1965	The New Yorker	In Cold Blood
Beth Ann and Macrobioticism	Robert Christgau	1965	New York Herald Tribune	-
Some Dreamers of the Golden Dream	Joan Didion	May 7, 1966	The Saturday Evening Post	Slouching Towards Bethlehem
‘That's What We Come to Minneapolis For,’ Stan Hough said	John Gregory Dunne	1969	-	The Studio
Charlie Simpson's Apocalypse	Joe Eszterhas	July 6, 1972	Rolling Stone	Charlie Simpson's Apocalypse
La Dolce Viva	Barbara Goldsmith	April 29, 1968	New York	-
Gear	Richard Goldstein	1969	The Village Voice	-
Khesanh	Michael Herr	September 1965	Esquire	-
Excerpt from The Armies of the Night	Norman Mailer	March 1968 Under the title, "On the Steps of the Pentagon"	Harper's Magazine	The Armies of the Night
Excerpt from The Selling of the President 1968	Joe McGinniss	1969	-	The Selling of the President 1968
The Detective	James Mills	December 3, 1965	Life	-
Excerpt from Paper Lion	George Plimpton	1966	-	Paper Lion
Ava: Life in the Afternoon	Rex Reed	May 1967	Esquire	Do You Sleep in the Nude?
Timing and a Diversion: The Cocoa Game	"Adam Smith" (pen name for George Goodman)	1967	New York World Journal Tribune	The Money Game
Excerpt from M	John Sack	October 1966	Esquire	M
Twirling at Ole Miss	Terry Southern	February 1963	Esquire	Red-Dirt Marijuana and Other Tastes
The Soft Psyche of Joshua Logan	Gay Talese	April 1963	Esquire	Fame and Obscurity
Excerpt from Hell's Angels	Hunter S. Thompson	1966	-	Hell's Angels
The Kentucky Derby Is Decadent and Depraved	Hunter S. Thompson	June 1970	Scanlan's Monthly	The Great Shark Hunt
The General Goes Zapping Charlie Cong	Nicholas Tomalin	June 5, 1966	The Sunday Times	-
Martin Luther King Is Still on the Case	Garry Wills	August 1968	Esquire	-
The Fugitive	Tom Wolfe	1968	-	The Electric Kool-Aid Acid Test
Radical Chic & Mau-Mauing the Flak Catchers	Tom Wolfe	June 8, 1970	New York	Radical Chic & Mau-Mauing the Flak Catchers

== Bibliography ==
=== Primary sources ===
- Murphy, James E. (May 1974). Westley, Bruce H. (ed.). The New Journalism: A Critical Perspective. Journalism Monographs. Vol. 34. The Association for Education in Journalism.
- Weingarten, Marc (2006). The Gang That Wouldn't Write Straight: Wolfe, Thompson, Didion, and the New Journalism Revolution. Crown Publishers. ISBN 1-4000-4914-8.
- Wolfe, Tom; Johnson, E. W. (1973). The New Journalism. Harper & Row. ISBN 0-06-014707-5.

==== Contemporary reviews ====
The New Journalism

- Arlen, Michael J. (May 1972). "Notes on the New Journalism". The Atlantic Monthly. The Atlantic Monthly Group.
- Wood, Michael (June 22, 1973). "The New Journalism". The New York Times.

Texts in the anthology

- Kazin, Alfred (May 5, 1968). "The Trouble He's Seen". The New York Times.

=== Secondary sources ===
- Capote, Truman (1966). In Cold Blood. Vintage. ISBN 0-679-74558-0.
- Truman, Capote (October 9, 1965). "Annals of Crime: In Cold Blood: III Answers". The New Yorker. pp. 58–183.
- Cartwright, Garth (May 12, 2001). "Master of the Rock Review". The Guardian.
- Didion, Joan (May 7, 1966). "Some Dreamers of the Golden Dream". The Saturday Evening Post.
- Dunne, John Gregory (1969). The Studio. Farrar, Straus and Giroux. ISBN 0-374-27112-7.
- McQuade, Donald, ed. (1974). Popular Writing in America: The Interaction of Style and Audience. Oxford University Press.
- Plimpton, George (September 7, 1964). "Zero of the Lions". Sports Illustrated. Archived from the original on September 14, 2010.
- Russello, Gerald J. (November 21, 2005). "How New Journalism Became Old News". The New York Sun. ONE SL LLC.
- Sack, John (October 1966). "M". Esquire. Hearst Corporation.
- Schuster, Mel, ed. (1971). Motion Picture Performers: A Bibliography of Magazine and Periodical Articles, 1900-1969. Scarecrow Press. ISBN 0-8108-0407-7.
- Tate, Ryan (December 9, 2008). "The Nude Photos That Nearly Destroyed New York". Gawker.com. Gawker Media.
- Thompson, Hunter S. (May 17, 1965). "The Motorcycle Gangs, Losers and Outsiders". The Nation. Katrina vanden Heuvel.
- Tomalin, Nicholas (June 5, 1966). "The General Goes Zapping Charlie Cong". The Times. News Corporation.
- Wolfe, Tom (July 14, 2008). "A City Built of Clay". New York. New York Media LLC.
- Wolfe, Tom (February 14, 1972). "The Birth of 'The New Journalism'; Eyewitness Report by Tom Wolfe". New York. New York Media LLC. p. 44.
- Wolfe, Tom (February 21, 1972). "The New Journalism: A la Recherche des Whichy Thickets". New York. New York Media LLC. p. 152.
- Wolfe, Tom (December 1972). "Why They Aren't Writing the Great American Novel Anymore". Esquire. Hearst Corporation.
- "The 7 Greatest Stories in the History of Esquire Magazine". Esquire. Hearst Corporation. November 30, 2009.
