= La Dolce Viva =

1968 article by Barbara Goldsmith

La Dolce Viva is a landmark article written in 1968 by Barbara Goldsmith about Viva (born Janet Susan Mary Hoffmann), a model and actress in Andy Warhol's movies. It was published in New York Magazine in the magazine's inaugural year; the profile and the accompanying nude photographs by Diane Arbus, depicted Viva as penniless, promiscuous, and addicted to drugs, caused a scandal that nearly scuttled the new publication. Although the photographs by Arbus are best known, the article's opening photograph, in which Viva is seated and fully clothed on a stool, was taken by Lee Kraft and had previously run in the American edition of Vogue.

== Summary ==
La Dolce Viva is an interview with Viva, one of the actresses in Andy Warhol's movies. Viva was headlined as 'The Last of Andy Warhol superstars', as Warhol would film them and declare them "superstars". Along with being an actress, Viva is a model who had modeled for Vogue and influenced the fashion trends of the time.

Viva grew up in a very Catholic home surrounded by figures of the Virgin Mary, Bibles, and pictures of First Communion, and lived with the nuns until she was twenty years old. Once Viva turned twenty, she left the religious ways of her family and the Catholic Church. The article notes that she had a degree from a Marymount College and had attended art schools in Paris, including a year at the Sorbonne. The article details Viva's experience with sex, drug, and love in Warhol's Factory; however Goldsmith's drafts of the article, kept along with her papers at the New York Public Library, included quotes from Viva that Goldsmith chose to not use, including, "If I feel the need to relax, I have a couple of drinks, but drugs – no."

Viva claimed to have been introduced to drugs by the experimental psychologist Timothy Leary, who told her to take psilocybin mushrooms, and lists all of the drugs she has taken. After this episode with Leary, she asked her mother to have her hospitalized in a mental institution, but then became alarmed and requested to leave. She was cared for by her mother at home before moving to New York to live with her sister. Viva's history of mental illness raised questions about if Goldsmith's article exploited an already vulnerable subject.

=== Tone ===
In La Dolce Viva the tone is honest, shocking to some, and nonchalant. Her lifestyle, especially her promiscuity, was not accepted in this period in time. Throughout Goldsmith's representation of tone and mood, it is somewhat negative as they scrimmage through her apartment junk, talk about her rough life, and the need for sex and drugs.

Viva's words are transcribed in detail, including conversation about her family, an unpaid ConEdison bill, drug use, and her precarious financial situation. However Goldsmith opted to not include her questions in the article, making it appear as if Viva's statements were spontaneous and natural.

=== Setting ===
La Dolce Viva takes place mostly in Warhol's new loft studio which has been named 'The Factory', which was full of his helpers and hangers-on. Some parts of the interview took place in Viva's East 83rd Street brownstone apartment which is scattered with the mixture of clean and dirty clothes, underwear, dishes in the sink, food on the counter and stacks of old magazines and papers; Goldsmith did not appear to have qualms about revealing most of her subject's home address. Along with Andy Warhol's apartment and Viva's apartment, part of the interview in La Dolce Viva also took place in Max's Kansas City, a restaurant where the models, actresses, and Warhol were treated like celebrities.

=== Characterization ===
Viva's character is introduced to readers as an actress in Andy Warhol's movies and later, readers find out that she is a model who influences the fashion industry. Goldsmith uses questions that lead to showing Viva's promiscuous side and her dependency on a male figure: Viva is quoted saying "I slept with him for security reasons" during the interview. Viva would go on to dispute Goldsmith's characterizations of these events and quotes, stating that most of the men she claimed to have had sex with were gay.

== Effects and criticism ==
La Dolce Viva revealed the seedier side of Andy Warhol's entourage through Viva. “I had never seen anything like it,” Tom Wolfe wrote of accompanying nude photos from Diane Arbus. According to contemporary New York Times review of the book, La Dolce Viva gave an insight to Warhol's relationship to other people. But the articles appearance in the New York hurt the magazine ("The Nude Photos that Nearly Destroyed New York"), and New York's editor, Clay Felker, was aware of the commercial risk he ran in publishing the piece.

Half of the magazine's investors pulled out after the article ran. Wolfe included it in his 1973 anthology, The New Journalism.

A month after the article's publication, Warhol was shot and nearly killed by Valerie Solanas while on the phone with Viva; the Warhol entourage became much more closed to journalists and other strangers. Viva left Warhol's circle in November 1969. The article was referenced in Viva's 1970 semi-autobiographical novel, Superstar.

Since the publication of La Dolce Viva, Hoffmann has contested the veracity of the article and stated that she did not give Arbus permission to photograph her naked. Arthur Lubow, Arbus's biographer, corroborated this, stating that Arbus said there was "no need [for Viva to get dressed], these would only be headshots, nothing would show" and that photographing and publishing Viva's entire, naked body was a "promise that Arbus sometimes failed to keep". Hoffmann also claimed that the photograph of her in which her eyes are rolling, giving the impression of being on drugs during the interview, was because Arbus directed her to roll her eyes; Lubow disputed this as Arbus disliked giving this kind of direction. Hoffmann was shown the article on the night of her appearance on The Merv Griffin Show and stated her intention to sue the magazine. Hoffmann's future bookings with Vogue were cancelled after Diana Vreeland, the editor, saw the photographs. In 1984, Felker stated that he had made "a terrible mistake" in publishing the pictures of Viva.

Arbus never published with New York again. Tom Wolfe stated in 2008 that an original print of Arbus's photographs of Viva would fetch about $500,000 at auction.
