= The Magic Christian (novel) =

1959 comic novel by Terry Southern

- First edition cover
- Author: Terry Southern
- Language: English
- Genre: Comedy novel
- Publisher: Random House (1959); Grove Press (1996)
- Publication date: 1959
- Publication place: United States
- Media type: Print (Hardback & Paperback)
- Pages: 148
- ISBN: 0-8021-3465-3 (reissue)
- Preceded by: Flash and Filigree
- Followed by: Writers in Revolt

The Magic Christian is a 1959 comic novel by American author Terry Southern (1924–1995) about an odd billionaire who spends most of his time playing elaborate practical jokes on people. It is known for bringing Southern to the attention of filmmaker Stanley Kubrick, who had received a copy as a gift from Peter Sellers, and subsequently hired Southern as co-writer for Dr. Strangelove (1964) when Kubrick decided to make that film a black comedy/satire, rather than a straightforward thriller. In 1969, The Magic Christian was made into a film starring Peter Sellers and Ringo Starr; the story was much altered and relocated from New York City to London.

== Plot summary ==
Guy Grand is an odd billionaire who spends most of his time playing elaborate practical jokes on people. A big spender, he does not mind losing large sums of money to complete strangers if he can have a good laugh. Through his pranks, he hopes to prove his theory that everyone has a price for which they can be bought.

One of Grand's favorite pranks is to buy hot dogs from railway station vendors just before the train pulls out, handing them one overly-large bill after another and then demanding his change, as the train begins to move and the vendor has to run to keep up.

Grand pays the actor playing a surgeon in a live television soap opera to deviate from the script, comment in drastic terms on the bad quality of the show, and walk off the set. Other actors follow in later weeks, in the same way, until critics begin to praise the show's "bold, innovative comedy" and the viewing audience comes to watch for "the moment" when an actor will break the fourth wall and leave the set. He also has unusual edits inserted into popular movies, and shown irregularly in theaters, disturbing the viewers who notice them.

Grand secretly buys a respectable New York advertising agency, installs a pygmy as its president and has him "scurry about the offices like a squirrel and chatter raucously in his native tongue" in front of all the top executive staff and their prominent clients. He then buys a cosmetics company and launches a big promotional campaign for a new shampoo which, as it turns out in the end, has a very detrimental effect on those who use it. A supposedly pheromone-based scent produced by the same company turns out to be a time-release stink bomb, causing wearers to smell horrible some hours after spraying it on.

Grand buys a downtown vacant lot in a major city. He then has a three-foot brick wall built around the perimeter and fills it with feces and offal into which dollar bills have been mixed. He then takes pleasure watching people defiling themselves by wading through the muck looking for money.

Grand makes a habit of having his chauffeur park illegally in downtown areas, and when being ticketed offering the officer enormous amounts of money to eat the ticket.

A newspaper under Grand's control first begins to add foreign language passages and perverse commentary to articles, then changes to reporting simply dry facts, then to printing only hate mail received by subscribers. Grand takes a vacation, showing up to an African safari with three natives carrying an unmounted howitzer, and firing it at game animals.

Grand's final adventure takes place on board the S.S. Magic Christian, a remodeled luxury liner catering only to the super-rich. He first arbitrarily rejects several Social Register favorites for passage, sending them into a furor, then the ship's crew treat the selected passengers harshly. Grand himself responds to the requests from notables for passage. One applicant, an Italian contessa, lists her family history and her qualifications, and Grand rejects her by writing, "No Wops" across the top, and returning it to her. Graffiti gradually appear on the walls, and the ship begins to resemble a ghetto, while the captain (actually an actor) insists everyone remain calm—even when it turns out the only food available is potatoes, and the ship turns around and heads back into port at top speed.

Grand cuts back on his activities afterward, limiting himself to stunts like buying local grocery stores, marking the prices down to pennies on the dollar (with even bigger discounts for bulk purchases), then watching the store stock empty out within hours as customers burden themselves with more groceries than they will ever use.
