= Lee Hill (writer) =

Lee Hill is the author of A Grand Guy—a biography of Terry Southern (2001)—as well as a monograph on the film Easy Rider (1996). He has contributed a wide range of journalism and commentary to Senses of Cinema, The Times, Scenario, Cinemascope, the Canadian Broadcasting Corporation, and other outlets. He was the managing editor of Vox Magazine, the critically acclaimed music monthly and program guide of CJSW-FM from 1988 through 1990.
