= Red-Dirt Marijuana and Other Tastes =

Short story collection by Terry Southern

First edition (publ. New American Library)

Red-Dirt Marijuana and Other Tastes (ISBN 0-8065-1167-2) is a collection of short fiction and essays works by satirical novelist and screenwriter Terry Southern, which was first published in 1967.

It consists of twenty-three pieces which were originally published in Esquire magazine, Evergreen Review, Harper's Bazaar, Hasty Papers, Nugget, The Paris Review, and The Realist. It was re-published in 1990 with a new introduction by George Plimpton. A film was made of the title Southern short story with Southern's involvement by Philip D. Schuman which won a Hugo at the Chicago International Film Festival in 1973.

== Stories ==
- "Red-Dirt Marijuana"
- "Razor Fight"
- "The Sun and the Still-born Stars"
- "The Night the Bird Blew for Doctor Warner"
- "A South Summer Idyll"
- "Put-down"
- "You're Too Hip, Baby"
- "You Gotta Leave Your Mark"
- "The Road Out of Axotle"
- "Apartment to Exchange"
- "Love Is a Many Splendored"
- "Twirling at Ole Miss"
- "Recruiting for the Big Parade"
- "I Am Mike Hammer"
- "The Butcher"
- "The Automatic Gate"
- "A Change of Style"
- "The Face of the Arena"
- "The Moon-shot Scandal"
- "Red Giant on Our Doorstep!"
- "Scandale at the Dumpling Shop"
- "Terry Southern Interviews a Faggot Male Nurse"
- "The Blood of a Wig"

== Plots and themes ==
Like much of Southern's work, Red-Dirt Marijuana and Other Tastes presents a detailed portrait of American culture during the 1950s. Many stories, in particular "You're Too Hip, Baby", "The Blood of a Wig", and "The Night the Bird Blew for Doctor Warner", explore the mentality of the hipster and the pretentiousness of countercultures.

Other stories, like "Recruiting for the Big Parade" and "Twirling at Ole Miss", present unusual non-fiction, and may be viewed as an early form of New Journalism. "Twirlin' at Ole Miss" has been cited by Tom Wolfe as one of the defining works of the genre and as such it was included in Wolfe and A.W. Johnson's anthology The New Journalism in 1973.

The majority of the book's stories, like the eponymous "Red-Dirt Marijuana", simply present detailed character sketches and bizarre flights of fancy. In "The Sun and the Still-Born Stars", a Texan farmer wages a surreal, Beowulfian struggle against a mysterious sea monster. In "Love Is a Many Splendored", Franz Kafka receives an obscene crank call from Sigmund Freud. Beneath these strange juxtapositions, Southern explores themes of alienation, love, and truth.

The collection has been widely praised by authors such as Norman Mailer, Gore Vidal, William S. Burroughs, Robert Anton Wilson, and Kurt Vonnegut. Joseph Heller characterized it as "the cutting edge of black comedy."
