= Lee Hill (scientist) =

Lee Hill is a South African Exercise Scientist and former head coach of the University of Cape Town swimming team as well as a published scientific writer. He specialises in the injuries to the shoulder, with a specific interest in swimming injuries.

== Academic career ==
He obtained an undergraduate degree in Human Bioscience, specialising in Psychology and Human Physiology. In 2012, Hill earned a post-graduate degree was in Exercise Science, obtained from the Division of Exercise Science and Sports Medicine at the University of Cape Town. He is currently reading towards a doctorate in Exercise Science at the University of Cape Town.

Hill has been published in a number of peer-reviewed journals such as the Oxford Research Encyclopedia of Psychology, the South African Journal of Sports Medicine and the Physician and Sports Medicine.
