= Joseph Lubin (accountant) =

American accountant (1899–1983)

- Born: Joseph I. Lubin; November 14, 1899; New York City
- Died: April 4, 1983 (aged 83); New Rochelle, New York
- Education: Pace University; New York University
- Occupation: Accountant
- Spouse: Evelyn Cronson

Joseph I. Lubin (November 14, 1899 – April 4, 1983) was an American accountant.

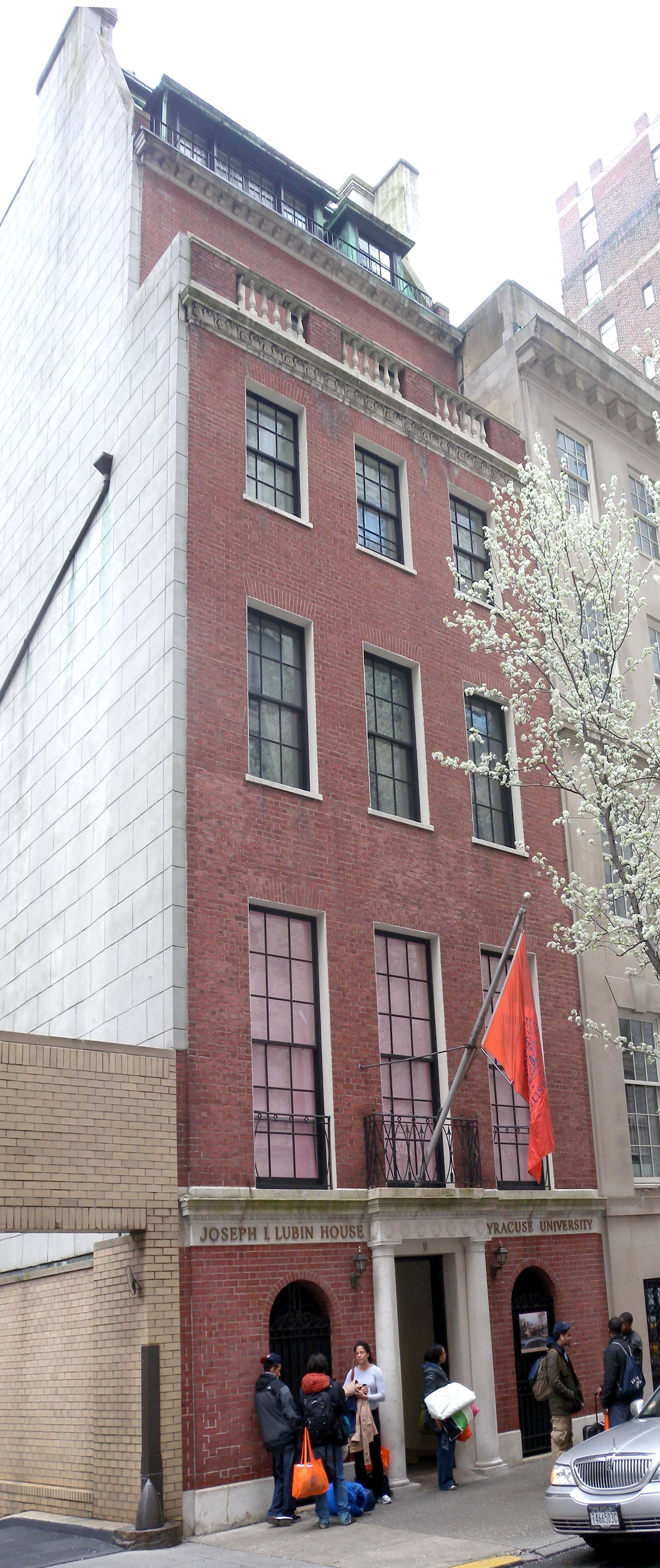
Syracuse University's Joseph Lubin House.

== Early life and education ==
A native New Yorker, born on the Lower East Side, Lubin had attended local public schools in the city before enrolling at Pace. Lubin received his Certificate in Accountancy from Pace University (then Pace Institute) in 1921 and a law degree from New York University in 1928.

== Career ==
Lubin went on to establish the nationwide accounting firm of Eisner and Lubin. He also served as chairman of the New York State Board of Certified Public Accountant Examiners and as a director of the New York State Society of Certified Public Accountants. During the Second World War, Lubin was Special Deputy Chief Investigator of the War Production Board, and Chairman of the Appeals Board of the New York County Selective Service. He also served on the board of the National Civil Service League and for a time was treasurer of the League. His corporate board memberships included United Cigar, Whelan Drug Corporation and the Phoenix Securities Corporation.

== Philanthropy ==
A financial supporter of education, Lubin was chairman of the Founders Society of the Albert Einstein College of Medicine and a member of the board of trustees of Syracuse University, New York University, and Yeshiva University. From 1961 until his death in 1983 Joseph Lubin was a member of the Pace University board of trustees. In 1955 his alma mater awarded him the honorary degree of Doctor of Commercial Science.

Lubin House, a private club on East 61st St., has been Syracuse University's New York City base since 1964. It houses the Louise and Bernard Palitz Gallery.

Two years before he died, Lubin presented Pace with the largest single donation ever received from an individual, a land trust fund that over a fifteen-year period would amount to $7.5 million. The Lubin School of Business at Pace University is named after him.
