= Mason Hoffenberg =

American writer (1922–1986)

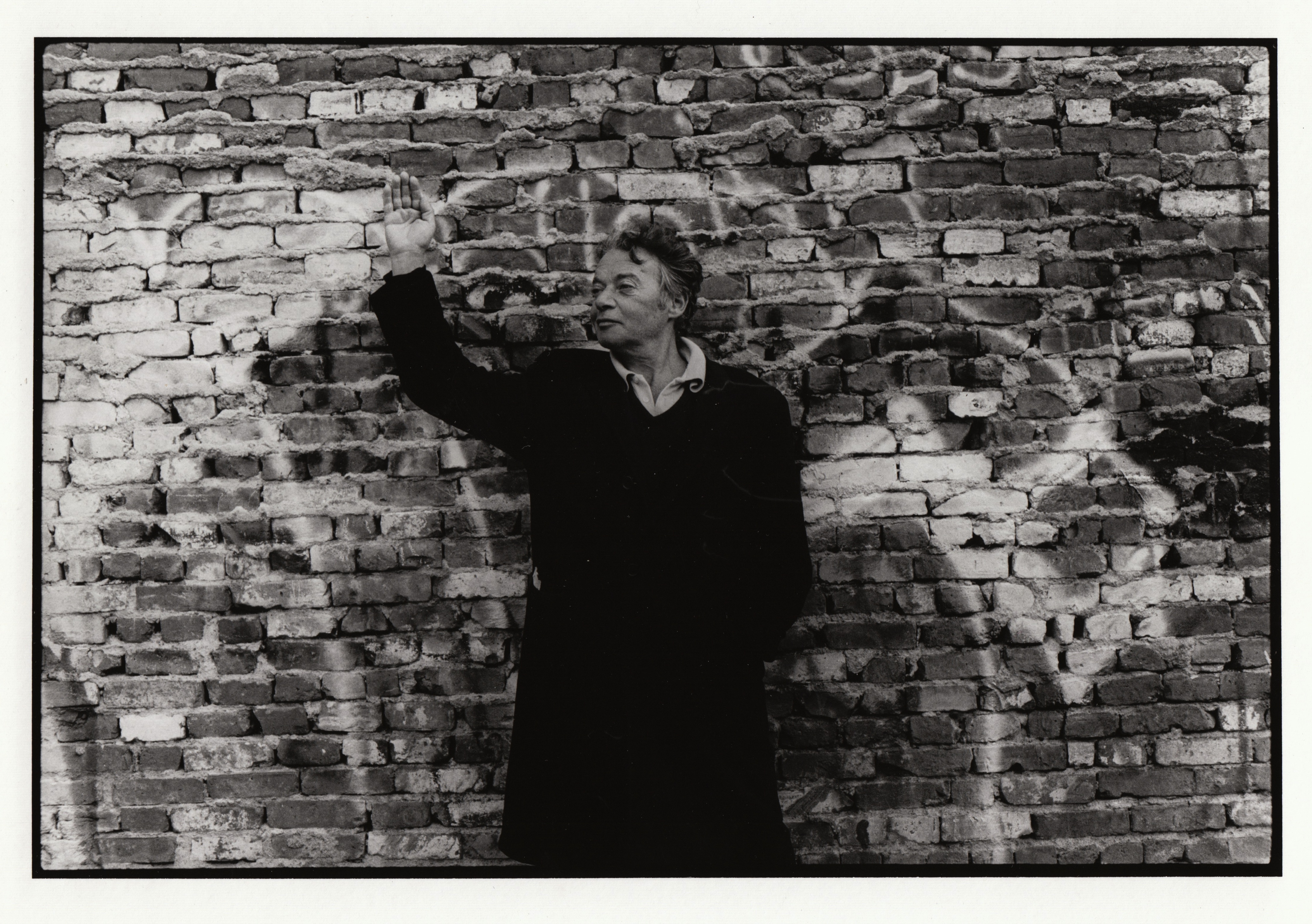

Mason Kass Hoffenberg (December 13, 1922 – June 1, 1986) was an American writer best known for having written the satiric novel Candy in collaboration with Terry Southern.

== Biography ==
Hoffenberg was born in New York City into a wealthy Jewish family. His father, Isidore Hoffenberg, was a successful self-made businessman. Sent to a military academy, he dropped out, but later attended Olivet College.

Hoffenberg was drafted in 1944 and became a member of the Army Air Force. He was stationed in England and later in Belgium, France and Germany as part of the post-war Allied occupation army. He returned to New York and studied at the New School on the G.I. Bill, though he continued to return to Paris, where he used his G.I. benefits to study at the Sorbonne. In New York, he lived in Greenwich Village and was roommates with James Baldwin. Hoffenberg poached girls interested in Baldwin, who told Hoffenberg he was bisexual; the two were not intimately involved. He became part of the Village literary scene of the 1950s, where he knew Jack Kerouac and Allen Ginsberg.

Back in Paris, he married a Frenchwoman in 1953, with whom he had two children, Juliette and Daniel. Working for Agence France Presse, he became friends with other American expatriates, including William S. Burroughs. He also was one of the writers who wrote "dirty books" for the Olympia Press, which brought him into collaboration with Southern. According to Hoffenberg,

Terry Southern and I wrote Candy for the money. Olympia Press, $500 flat. He was in Switzerland, I was in Paris. We did it in letters. But when it got to be a big deal in the States, everybody was taking it seriously. Do you remember what kind of shit people were saying? One guy wrote a review about how Candy was a satire on Candide. So right away I went back and reread Voltaire to see if he was right. That's what happens to you. It's as if you vomit in the gutter and everybody starts saying it's the greatest new art form, so you go back to see it, and, by God, you have to agree.

Hoffenberg said that he tried to interest Maurice Girodias, of Olympia Press, in Burroughs's Naked Lunch, but the publisher was initially not interested, though he published the book later.

Hoffenberg never had another writing success after Candy, unlike Southern, who became famous. He wrote the erotic novel Sin for Breakfast, published by Sphere (London) in 1971. In Paris, he became a heroin addict and then kicked the habit with the help of methadone. He eventually became an alcoholic.

In the 1960s, he replaced his literary friends with friends from the pop music world, including Bob Dylan, whom he met in London. Living in Swinging London in the 1960s, he befriended Marianne Faithfull, Mick Jagger and Yoko Ono. In the late 1960s, he moved back to America, first to New York City and later to Woodstock, New York, where he developed a close friendship with Richard Manuel of The Band. He then lived in Mallorca, Spain before permanently returning to Manhattan in 1978.

He died of lung cancer at Lenox Hill Hospital in New York City on 1 June 1986.
