= Honor Thy Father =

1971 nonfiction book by Gay Talese

- First edition
- Author: Gay Talese
- Language: English
- Genre: Non-fiction; New Journalism
- Publisher: World Publishing Company
- Publication date: 1971
- Publication place: United States
- Pages: 496
- ISBN: 028562038X

Honor Thy Father is a 1971 book by Gay Talese, about the travails of the Bonanno crime family in the 1960s, especially Salvatore Bonanno and his father Joseph "Joe Bananas" Bonanno.

== Background ==
In 1965, Gay Talese left his job as a reporter at The New York Times to focus on magazine writing, such as 1966's "Frank Sinatra Has a Cold" and longer projects, like his 1969 book The Kingdom and the Power. During this period, however, Talese had begun to research a book about the Mafia.

The research for the book began when Talese introduced himself to mafioso Salvatore "Bill" Bonanno in a courthouse in 1965. That same year, Talese signed a $30,000 advance to write the book. For nearly seven years, Talese interviewed Bonanno and other members of the Mafia extensively. Talese even traveled to Castellammare del Golfo, Sicily, to research the ancestral origins of the subjects of his story. Talese feared, during the research, that the government would subpoena him to find out what he learned about the Mafia, though this never came to pass. He also fretted that he would be mistaken for one of Bonanno's associates by his enemies.

== Story ==
The book begins when Joseph "Joe Bananas" Bonanno is kidnapped from the streets of New York in 1964 and the Bonanno crime family is thrown into disarray for two years in a power struggle called the Banana War, culminating in an armed ambush in Brooklyn in which Joe's son Bill Bonanno is nearly killed.

Though punctuated by life-threatening encounters, Talese also recounts how much of a mafioso's life is as tedious as any person's: days filled with television, overeating, time spent with family. Prominent mafiosi, like Vito Genovese, Lucky Luciano, Joseph Profaci, feature in Talese's account, but the story is focused on Bill Bonanno's thoughts about his life as a mafioso. Talese notes the similarities of Bill's life to many ordinary Americans — homogenized from his ancestors' culture, an alumnus of the University of Arizona where he belonged to ROTC. But as son of Joe Bonanno, he was an heir to his father's empire, which was a source of great stress for Bill. The book's title was suggested by Bill's wife Rosalie as acid commentary on the deleterious effect of Joe Bonanno on her husband's life. The intensely introspective account that Talese extracted from Bill Bonanno prompted Time magazine to label him "the golden retriever of personalized journalism". A review in The New York Times wrote that Talese "conveys the impression that being a mobster is much the same as being a sportsman, film star or any other kind of public 'personality.'"

Talese concludes with the controversial thesis that the Italian Mafia was little different than gangs that came with previous waves of immigration, such as Irish gangs in the century before, or black and Latino gangs that Talese saw as following. Talese attributed the rise of the gangs as a consequence of a majority that oppresses a minority group.

== Reception ==
Following the success of Talese's previous book The Kingdom and the Power, his book on the Mafia was primed for success, and quickly became a bestseller. Talese's use of literary techniques that were traditionally the domain of fiction, known as "new journalism", still was regarded with caution and many suspected the technique of fabrication; a charge that Talese has always strongly denied. A reviewer in The New York Times wrote that Talese's "fiction-imposed-on-fact has the unfortunate effect of making the whole story seem unreal". Also writing in the Times, David Halberstam criticized previous reviewers for failing to recognize that Talese's story was more real and had been criticized for not conforming to other reviewers' preconceived ideas about what the Mafia should be like. In general, however, the book was critically acclaimed. The Washington Post wrote:

After the principals are all gone, the book will remain, a family saga as important as any we've seen in this country. It is a book about fathers and sons, about trust and betrayal, about the old style and the new; it is, of course, a tragedy, because the genre of the family saga, real or imagined, always seems to turn out that way. But the book is also a stunning comment on America and the failure of its romantic promise.

Joe Bonanno disliked the book and refused to speak to his son Bill after the book came out. Joe reportedly spoke to Talese after publication of the book and said "my son was too sincere with you." Bill Bonanno was initially not happy with the book either, but after rereading the book he became more comfortable with it and asked Talese to inscribe copies for his children.

By November 1971 the book had sold nearly 200,000 copies and a second printing of 160,000 copies was ordered. Paperback rights were purchased for $450,000 by Fawcett World Library, a greater sum than Fawcett had paid for paperback rights to Mario Puzo's The Godfather.

Though Bill Bonanno was in prison when the book came out, he later cooperated in the production of a CBS miniseries, Honor Thy Father, based on his role in the book and a Showtime miniseries, Bonanno: A Godfather's Story about his life. Before his death in January 2008, Bonanno also appeared in numerous news programs and documentary looks at the Mafia.

== Film ==
In 1973, a TV movie adaptation was made. It was directed by Paul Wendkos, and starred Joseph Bologna as Salvatore Bonanno, Brenda Vaccaro as Rosalie Bonanno, and Raf Vallone as Joseph Bonanno.
