= The Fourth Treasure =

Novel by Todd Shimoda

- First edition
- Author: Todd Shimoda
- Language: English
- Genre: Fiction
- Published: 2002, Nan A. Talese
- Publication place: United States
- Media type: Print, ebook
- Pages: 368 pages
- ISBN: 0385503520
- Preceded by: 365 Views

The Fourth Treasure is a 2002 novel by Todd Shimoda and his second book. The work was first published on 16 April 2002 through Nan A. Talese and follows a young woman in her first year of graduate school.

== Synopsis ==
Tina Suzuki is a new graduate student at the UC Berkeley Institute for Brain and Behavior Studies. She's largely unaware of her own family history, as she's lived in San Francisco all of her life and her own mother is relatively close lipped about the subject. When Tina's discovers that her boyfriend's calligraphy teacher Zenzen has agraphia and aphasia as a result of a stroke, yet continues to create lovely works of art, Tina decides to approach him to take part in her research study, she's met with no small amount of resistance from everyone around her, including her mother, boyfriend, and colleagues. What Tina is unaware of is that her mother (who is secretly suffering from multiple sclerosis) has previously had an affair with Zenzen and Tina herself is the product of that liaison.

== Reception ==
Critical reception for The Fourth Treasure has been mostly positive. The Japan Times praised the work, stating that it was "rife with situations that combine American ease and curiosity with Japanese formality and reserve — an old formula, to be sure, but one that Shimoda brings a fresh perspective to." Boulder Weekly also gave a favorable review, stating that it was "an ambitious project expertly executed; it is a touching story and great read." The Los Angeles Times and Chicago Tribune were slightly more mixed with their reviews, with both rating the book highly while stating that the book had some flaws.
