= Gay Talese =

American writer (born 1932)

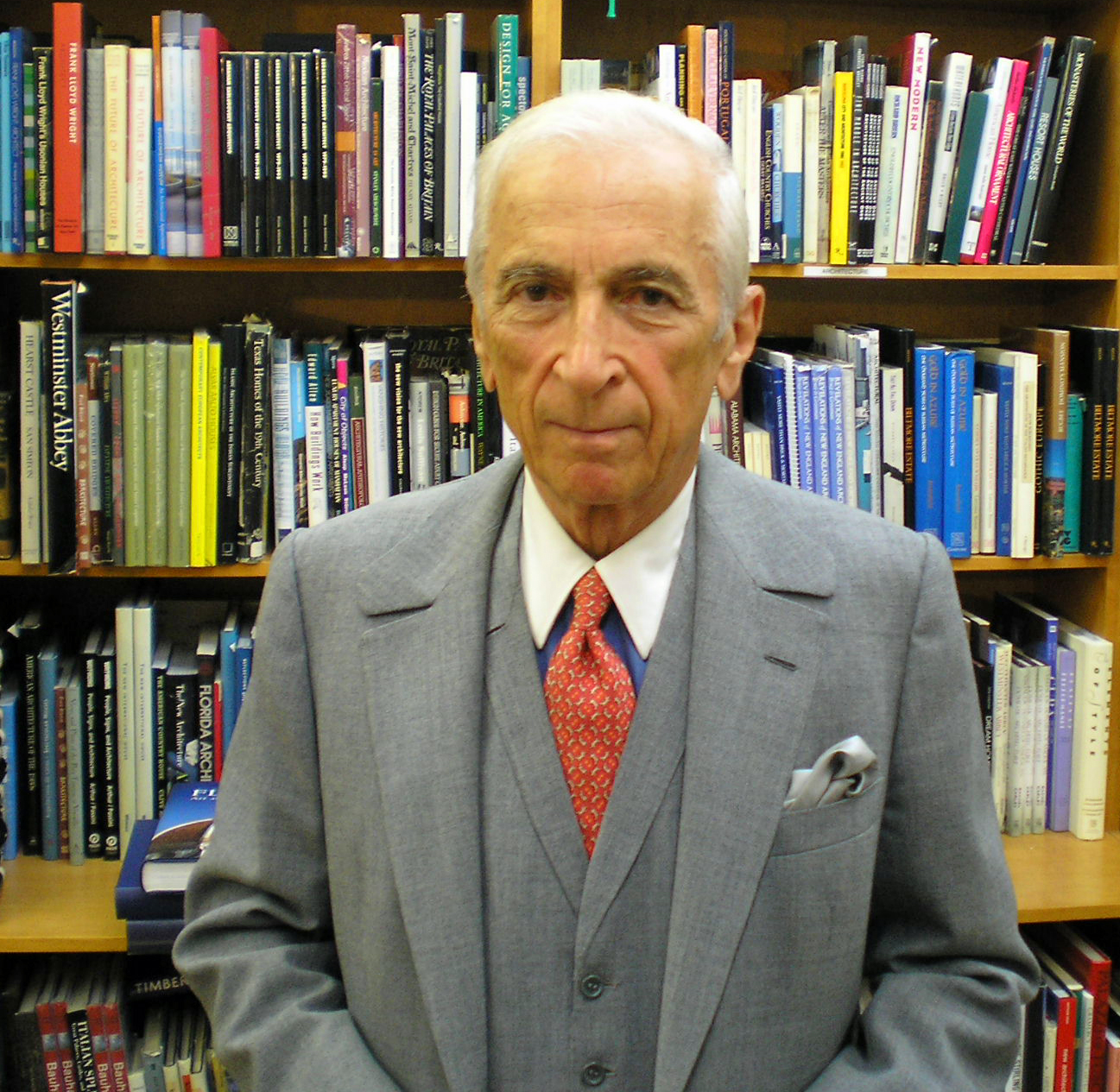
- Talese in 2006
- Born: Gaetano Talese; February 7, 1932 (age 94); Ocean City, New Jersey, U.S.
- Education: University of Alabama
- Occupation: Journalist
- Spouse: Nan Ahearn (m. 1959)
- Children: 2
- Writing career
- Years active: 1961–present
- Genres: Literary journalism, New Journalism
- Notable works: "Frank Sinatra Has a Cold" (1966); Honor Thy Father (1971); Thy Neighbor's Wife (1981)

Gaetano "Gay" Talese (/təˈliːs/; born February 7, 1932) is an American writer. As a journalist for The New York Times and Esquire magazine during the 1960s, he helped to define contemporary literary journalism and is considered, along with Joan Didion, Truman Capote, Norman Mailer, Hunter S. Thompson and Tom Wolfe, one of the pioneers of New Journalism. Talese's most famous articles are about Joe DiMaggio and Frank Sinatra.

== Early life and education ==
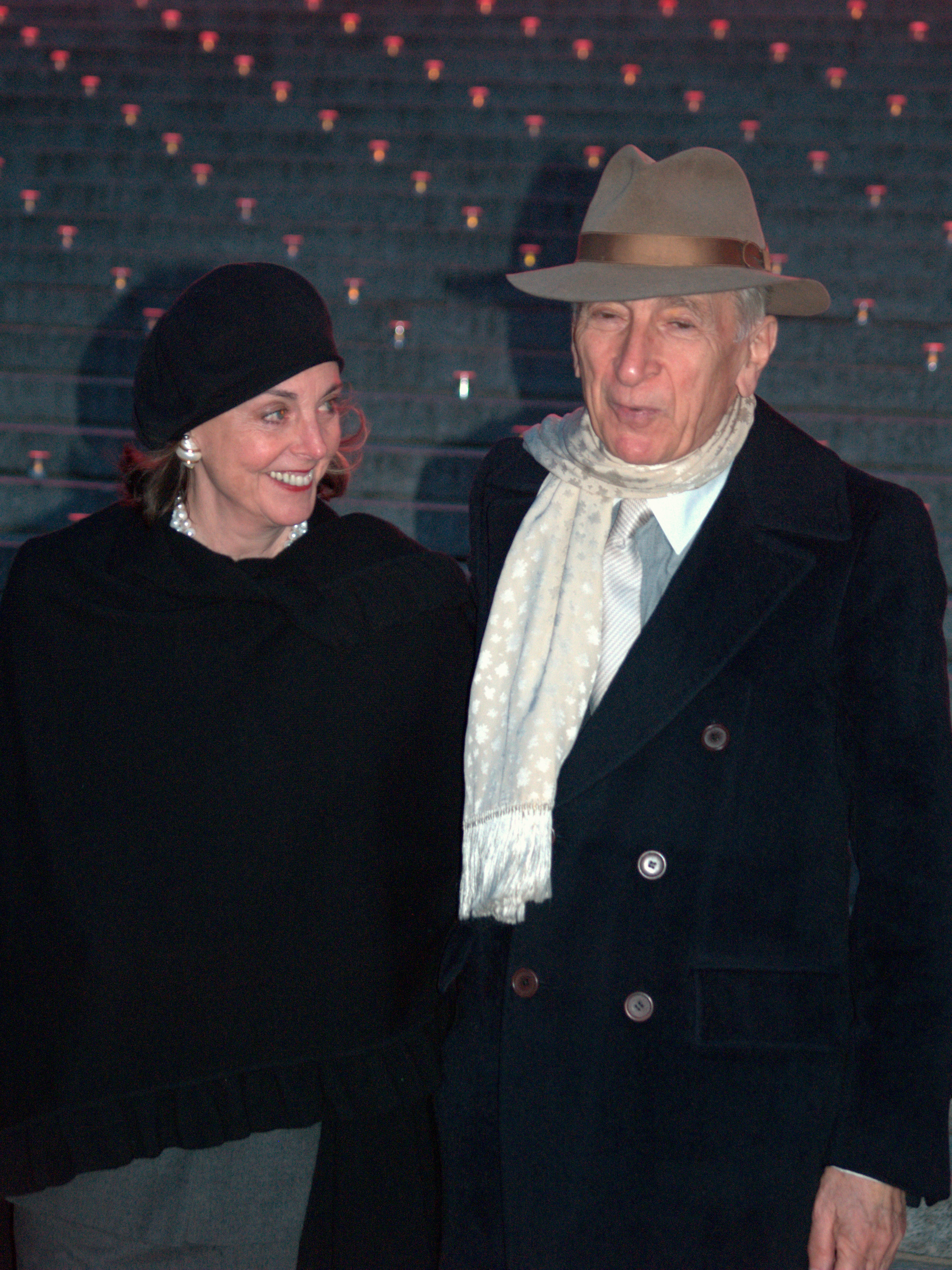
Talese with Nan Talese at the 2009 Tribeca Film Festival

Talese, who is of Italian heritage, was born in Ocean City, New Jersey. His father, Joseph Talese, was a tailor who had emigrated to the United States in 1922 from Maida, a small town in the province of Catanzaro, in the region of Calabria in southern Italy. His mother, the former Catherine DePaolo, was born in Brooklyn to parents who had emigrated from the same area in southern Italy, and worked as a buyer for a Brooklyn department store. At school as a child, Talese wore hand-crafted suits from his father's shop which, he later speculated in his memoir, Origins of a Nonfiction Writer (1996), caused him to seem older than his classmates. Talese recounted his early years in his book Unto the Sons.

Talese graduated from Ocean City High School in 1949. Screenwriter and author Nicholas Pileggi is his first cousin.

Talese's entry into writing was entirely coincidental and an unintentional consequence of his attempt as a high school sophomore to gain more playing time on the baseball team. The assistant coach had the duty of telephoning in the chronicle of each game to the local newspaper and when he complained he was too busy to do it properly, the head coach gave Talese the duty. As he recalls in his 1996 memoiristic essay "Origins of a Nonfiction Writer":

On the mistaken assumption that relieving the athletic department of its press duties would gain me the gratitude of the coach and get me more playing time, I took the job and even embellished it by using my typing skills to compose my own account of the games rather than merely relaying the information to the newspapers by telephone.

After only seven sports articles, Talese was given his own column for the weekly Ocean City Sentinel-Ledger in Ocean City. By the time he left for college in September 1949, he had written some 311 stories and columns for the Sentinel-Ledger.

Talese credits his mother as the role model he followed in developing the interviewing techniques that he would use during his career. He relates in "Origins of a Nonfiction Writer":

I learned [from my mother] ... to listen with patience and care, and never to interrupt even when people were having great difficulty in explaining themselves, for during such halting and imprecise moments ... people are very revealing—what they hesitate to talk about can tell much about them. Their pauses, their evasions, their sudden shifts in subject matter are likely indicators of what embarrasses them, or irritates them, or what they regard as too private or imprudent to be disclosed to another person at that particular time. However, I have also overheard many people discussing candidly with my mother what they had earlier avoided—a reaction that I think had less to do with her inquiring nature or sensitively posed questions than with their gradual acceptance of her as a trustworthy individual in whom they could confide.

Talese graduated from the University of Alabama in 1953. His selection of a major was, as he described it, a moot choice. "I chose journalism as my college major because that is what I knew," he recalls, "but I really became a student of history." At university, he became a brother of Phi Sigma Kappa fraternity.

It was there that Talese would begin to employ literary devices more well known for fiction, such as establishing the "scene" with minute details and beginning articles in medias res. During his junior year, he became the sports editor for the campus newspaper, The Crimson White, and started a column he dubbed "Sports Gay-zing", for which he wrote on November 7, 1951:

Rhythmic "Sixty Minute Man" emanated from the Supe Store juke box and Larry (The Maestro) Chiodetti beat against the table like mad in keeping time with the jumpy tempo. T-shirted Bobby Marlow was just leaving the Sunday morning bull session and dapper Bill Kilroy had just purchased the morning newspapers.

== Career ==
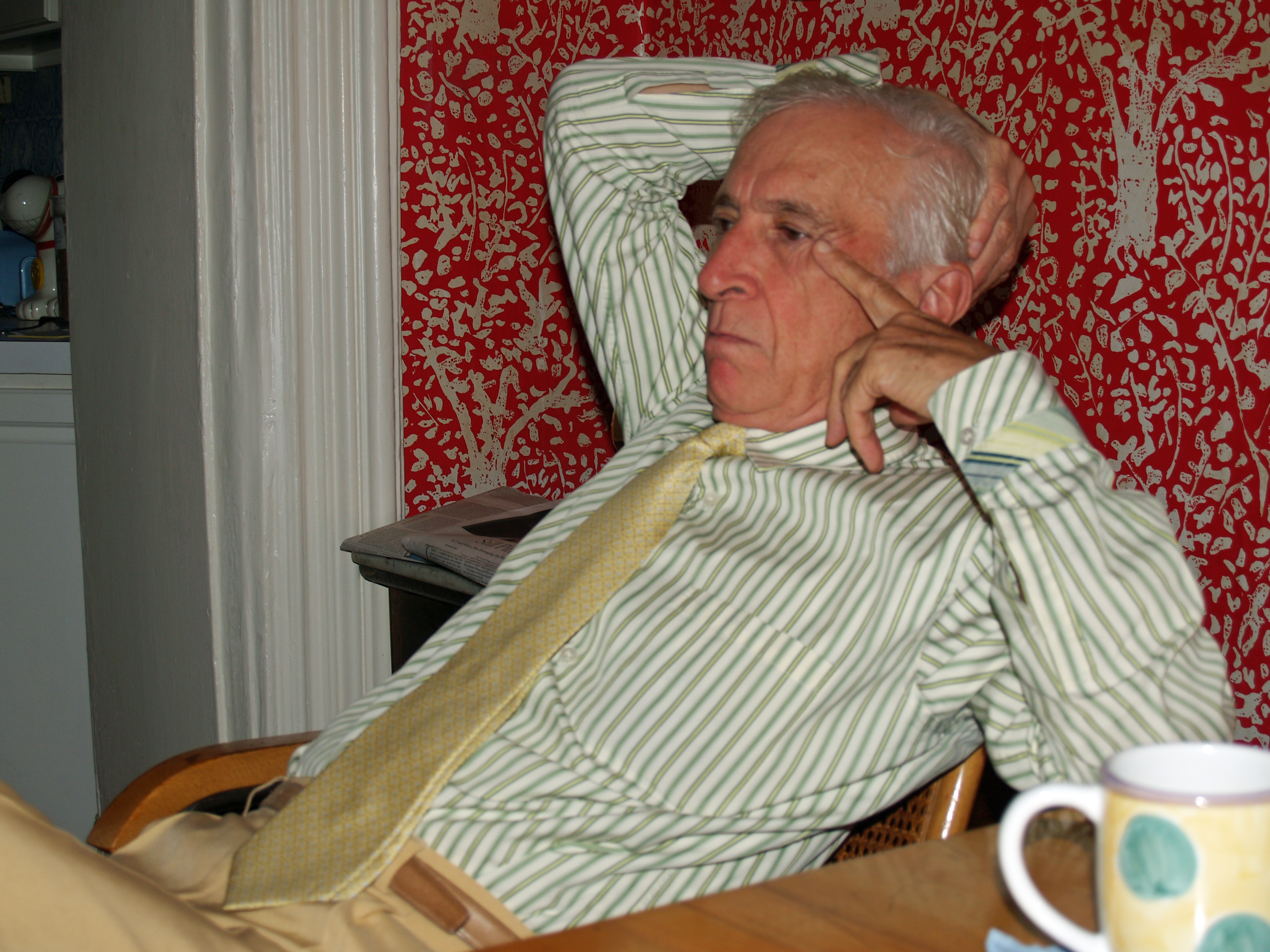
Talese at home in 2007

=== Newspaper reporter ===
After graduation in June 1953, Talese moved to New York City, but could only find work as a copyboy. The job, however, was at The New York Times. He was eventually able to get an article published in the Times, albeit unsigned. In "Times Square Anniversary" (November 2, 1953), Talese interviewed the man (Herbert Kesner, Broadcast Editor) responsible for managing the headlines that flash across the famous marquee above Times Square.

Talese followed this up with an article in the 21 February 1954 edition concerning the chairs used on the boardwalk of Atlantic City. However, his budding journalism career would have to be put on hold, as he was drafted into the United States Army in 1954.

Talese had been required (as were all male students at the time owing to the Korean War) to join the Reserve Officers' Training Corps (ROTC), and had moved to New York awaiting his eventual commission as a second lieutenant. Talese was sent to Fort Knox, Kentucky, to train in the Tank Corps. Finding his mechanical skills lacking, Talese was transferred to the Office of Public Information where he worked for an army newspaper, Inside the Turret (known today as The Gold Standard), and soon had his own column, "Fort Knox Confidential".

When Talese completed his military service in 1956, he was re-engaged by The New York Times as a sports reporter. Talese later opined, "Sports is about people who lose and lose and lose. They lose games; then they lose their jobs. It can be very intriguing." Of the various fields, boxing had the most appeal for Talese, largely because it was about individuals engaged in contests and those individuals in the mid to late 1950s were becoming predominately non-white at the prizefight level. He wrote 38 articles about Floyd Patterson alone.

Talese was then assigned to the Times' Albany Bureau to cover state politics. It was a short-lived assignment, however, as his exacting habits and meticulous style soon irritated his new editors so much that they recalled him to the city, assigning him to write minor obituaries. As Talese puts it: "I was banished to the obituary desk as punishment – to break me. There were major obituaries and minor obituaries. I was sent to write minor obituaries not even seven paragraphs long." After a year working for the Times obituary section, he began to write articles for the Sunday Times, which was then managed as a separate organization from the daily Times by editor Lester Markel.

=== Magazine reporter ===
Talese's first piece for the magazine Esquire – a series of scenes in New York City – appeared in a special New York issue in July 1960. When the Times newspaper unions had a work stoppage in December 1962, Talese had plenty of time to watch rehearsals for a production by Broadway director Joshua Logan for an Esquire profile. As Carol Polsgrove indicates in her history of Esquire during the 1960s, it was the kind of reporting he liked to do best: "just being there, observing, waiting for the climactic moment when the mask would drop and true character would reveal itself."

In 1964, Talese published The Bridge: The Building of the Verrazano-Narrows Bridge, a reporter-style, non-fiction depiction of the construction of the Verrazzano–Narrows Bridge in New York City. In 1965, he left The New York Times to write full-time for editor Harold Hayes at Esquire. His 1966 Esquire article on Frank Sinatra, "Frank Sinatra Has a Cold", is one of the most influential American magazine articles of all time, and a pioneering example of New Journalism and creative nonfiction. With what some have called brilliant structure and pacing, the article focused not just on Sinatra himself, but also on Talese's pursuit of his subject.

Talese's celebrated Esquire essay about Joe DiMaggio, "The Silent Season of a Hero" – in part a meditation on the transient nature of fame – was also published in 1966.

For his part, Talese regarded his 1966 profile of obituarist Alden Whitman, "Mr. Bad News", as his finest.

A number of Talese's Esquire essays were collected into the 1970 book Fame and Obscurity; in its introduction, Talese paid tribute to two writers he admired, citing "an aspiration on my part to somehow bring to reportage the tone that Irwin Shaw and John O'Hara had brought to the short story."

In 1971, Talese published Honor Thy Father, a book about the travails of the Bonanno crime family in the 1960s, especially Salvatore Bonanno and his father Joseph. The book was based on seven years of research and interviews. Honor Thy Father was made into a television film in 1973.

Talese signed a $1.2 million contract with Doubleday in 1972 to write two books, with the first, Thy Neighbor's Wife, due in 1973. Paperback rights to Thy Neighbor's Wife were sold to Dell Publishing for $750,000 in 1973. He missed Doubleday's initial deadline and spent 8 years researching the book, including managing massage parlors in New York and running a sex shop. In 1979 United Artists paid Talese a record $2.5 million for the film rights. The book was eventually published in 1981 but no film was produced.

In 2008, The Library of America selected Talese's 1970 account of the Charles Manson murders, "Charlie Manson's Home on the Range", for inclusion in its two-century retrospective of American True Crime.

In 2011, Talese was awarded the Norman Mailer Prize for Distinguished Journalism.

== Personal life ==
In 1959, Talese married writer Nan Talese (née Ahearn), a New York editor who manages the Nan A. Talese/Doubleday imprint. Their marriage is being documented in a non-fiction book he has been working on since 2007. They have two daughters, Pamela Talese, a painter, and Catherine Talese, a photographer and photo editor.

Talese was a close friend of fellow journalist and author Tom Wolfe.

=== Views ===
Talese is a lifelong Democrat. Despite this, he was a fierce critic of President Barack Obama and has defended President Donald Trump on several occasions. In a February 2017 interview with Haaretz, Talese said, “This crazy Trump, hustler, real estate tycoon, I think he’s better than Obama. We love to say Obama is Frederick Douglass, Obama is Booker T. Washington, Obama is Paul Robeson, the enlightenment. Well it didn’t work."

== Controversies ==
In April 2016, Talese spoke at a panel at a Boston University journalism conference. During the panel, Talese was asked what non-fiction women writers he found inspiring, to which he responded, "I didn't know any women writers that I loved." In response, a Twitter hashtag was created under #womengaytaleseshouldread.

In June 2016, the credibility of Talese's book The Voyeur's Motel, whose subject was Gerald Foos, was questioned when it came to light Foos had made false statements to Talese which Talese did not verify. When news of the credibility broke, Talese stated, "I'm not going to promote this book. How dare I promote it when its credibility is down the toilet?" In subsequent interviews and on an appearance on Late Night with Seth Meyers, Talese recanted this disavowal, stating that his story was still accurate despite the discrepancies found by The Washington Post.

In a November 2017 interview with Vanity Fair at the New York Public Library's Literary Lions Gala, Talese made comments about the sexual assault accusations against Kevin Spacey that had surfaced over the previous weeks. Talese stated, "I would like to ask [Spacey] how it feels to lose a lifetime of success and hard work all because of 10 minutes of indiscretion 10 years or more ago. The remarks were criticized,, with The Washington Post calling his statements a "bizarre, rabid defense of the actor."

== In popular culture ==
- Talese appeared as a character in several strips of the comic Doonesbury.
- Talese is referenced in Pete Townshend's "Communication".
- Talese is referenced in season 1, episode 3 of Ted Lasso.

== Works ==
As author:

- New York: A Serendipiter's Journey (1961)
- The Bridge: The Building of the Verrazano-Narrows Bridge (1964) ISBN 978-0802776440
- The Overreachers (1965; compilation of past reportage)
- The Kingdom and the Power (1969) ISBN 978-0812977684
- Fame and Obscurity (1970; compilation of past reportage, including "Frank Sinatra Has a Cold") ISBN 978-1015280809
- Honor Thy Father (1971) ISBN 978-0061665363
- Thy Neighbor's Wife (1981) ISBN 978-0061665431
- Unto the Sons (1992; memoir) ISBN 978-0679410348
- The Gay Talese Reader: Portraits and Encounters (2003; contains material from New York: A Serendipiter's Journey, The Overreachers and Fame and Obscurity) ISBN 978-0802776754
- A Writer's Life (2006; memoir) ISBN 978-0679410966
- The Silent Season of a Hero: The Sports Writing of Gay Talese (2010; compilation of past reportage) ISBN 978-0802777539
- The Voyeur's Motel (2016) ISBN 978-0802126979
- Frank Sinatra Has a Cold (2016; coffee table book version of the 1966 article with photographs by Phil Stern) ISBN 978-3836588294
- Bartleby and Me: Reflections of an Old Scrivener (2023) ISBN 978-0358455479

As editor

- Writing Creative Nonfiction: The Literature of Reality (1995; with Barbara Lounsberry) ISBN 978-0060465872

== Films ==
- Voyeur (2017)
