= Maida, Calabria =

Maida
- Comune
- Comune di Maida
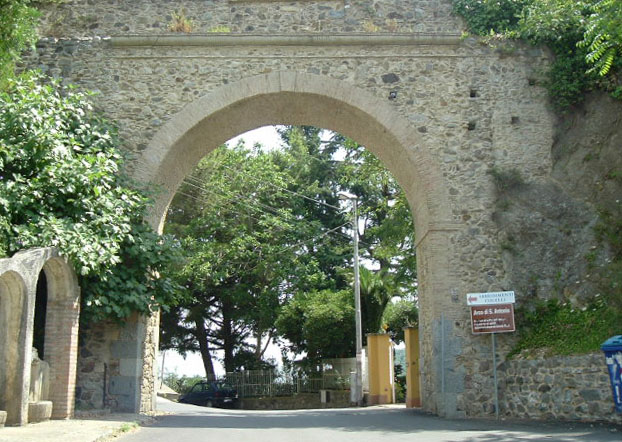
- Arco di Sant'Antonio, leading into the Old Town.

- Coat of arms

- Location within Italy Location within Calabria
- Coordinates: 38°51′N 16°22′E
- Country: Italy
- Region: Calabria
- Province: Catanzaro (CZ)
- Frazioni: Vena di Maida

Government
  - Mayor: Salvatore Paone

Area
  - Total: 58.2 km^{2} (22.5 sq mi)
- Elevation: 299 m (981 ft)

Population (31 December 2013)
  - Total: 4,534
  - Density: 77.9/km^{2} (202/sq mi)
- Demonym: Maidesi
- Time zone: UTC+1 (CET)
  - Summer (DST): UTC+2 (CEST)
- Postal code: 88025
- Dialing code: 0968
- Patron saint: St. Francis of Paola
- Saint day: 2 April
- Website: Official website

Maida is an Italian town and comune in the province of Catanzaro, in the Calabria region of southern Italy. The British routed the French in the Battle of Maida in 1806, as part of the War of the Third Coalition.

Maida is 16 kilometres (10 mi) south of Lamezia Terme and 31 kilometres (19 mi) west of the provincial capital Catanzaro.

== History ==
On 4 July 1806 the British under General John Stuart defeated the French under Jean Reynier outside the town at the Battle of Maida. A London pub on the Edgware Road was named The Hero of Maida, which in turn gave its name to the adjoining London districts, Maida Hill and, later, Maida Vale. King Ferdinand IV of Naples and Sicily awarded Stuart the title of Count of Maida.

The Norman castle of Maida was built in the 11th century under the direction of Duke Robert Guiscard.

== Famous citizens ==
- Mgr Giovanni Cervadoro, the Carbonaro and teacher, was born in Maida in 1783 and died in 1836, and wrote School Stabilimenti for his students in 1829.
- Baldassarre Squitti, the teacher and politician, was born in Maida in 1855.
- American writer Gay Talese wrote about his ancestors from Maida in his 1992 book Unto the Sons.
- Giuseppe Donato, sculptor and protégé of Auguste Rodin, was born in Maida in 1881 and died in Philadelphia, Pennsylvania, in 1965.

== Economy ==
The main economic activity in the area is agriculture, especially the cultivation of olive trees, citrus, and kiwifruit. In recent years, tourism has become a significant source of income. The town boasts the largest shopping centre in the region.

== Sister cities ==
Maida is a sister city with:

- Ambler, Pennsylvania, United States
