= Carl Fischer (photographer) =

American magazine photographer (1924–2023)

Carl Fischer (May 3, 1924 – April 7, 2023) was an American art director and autodidact magazine photographer. His work for covers and picture stories in Esquire and other magazines were controversial, original prints of which, and published copies, are held in a number of international museums.

== Early life ==
Carl Fischer was born on May 3, 1924, to Irma (Schwerin) and Joseph Fischer, and raised in Brooklyn. He took painting at Cooper Union but majored in graphic design, graduating in 1948 with the Augustus St. Gaudens Medal. He worked as an art director before receiving a Fulbright Scholarship in 1951 and went to England where he studied book design and typography at the Central Saint Martins College of Art and Design in London, and used their darkroom to teach himself photography from library books.

== Esquire ==
Fischer began his career as an advertising agency art director in New York working with Paul Rand and Herb Lubalin then began photographing for Esquire magazine when Harold Hayes became its editor in chief in 1963 and was commissioned throughout the 1960s and early 1970s for covers and their accompanying photo-reportage. Working with the magazine's creative consultant George Lois, who thought Fischer was one of the few photographers who understood his ideas, they devised what became amongst the most famous and provocative Esquire covers of the 1960s decade; Muhammad Ali as a martyred St Sebastian, an image so popular that it was used as a protest poster, and a montage of Andy Warhol drowning in a giant can of tomato soup. The magazine's audience, which had been flagging, was regenerated by these covers and by 1967 Esquire was achieving a $3M profit. By 1968 all of the covers for that year featured Fischer's photographs. His studio was a townhouse on East Eighty-third Street, New York City, where he lived.

In 1990 Steven Heller, senior art director of The New York Times, when asked what icons of American graphic design were worth preserving, declared;

George Lois's Esquire covers from the mid-196os to the very early '70s are. Most were collaborations with photographer Carl Fischer that took an average of three days to produce; they are considered among the most powerful propaganda imagery in any medium and certainly the most memorable magazine covers ever.

Interviewed by the magazine in 2015 he recalled;

One of the first assignments Hayes gave me was a series of portraits of Southern segregationists. He said, 'Look, we don't want to be seen as editorializing. We want to be fair and we want to give their point of view, so don't use your goddamn wide-angle lens.' He thought that lens would make them look bad, so while I didn't use it, I did make some little changes that I think made [the segregationists] look as ugly as we all thought they were.

In that instance Fischer had recopied the pictures on his enlarger to increase their contrast and thus coarsen the skin texture, with unflattering results.

Among his other subjects were movie stars, artists and athletes, but the covers were often politically charged, and included war criminal William Calley surrounded by Vietnamese children, or during the peak of the civil rights movement, Sonny Liston as an angry black Santa Claus. Hayes, in a 1981 article in Adweek, recalled the response to the cover which cost the magazine dearly in lost advertising revenue;

Sonny Liston was a bad black who beat up good blacks, like Floyd Patterson; there was no telling what he might do to a white man. In 1963, when this was the sort of possibility that preyed on white men's minds everywhere, [Carl Fischer's and] George Lois's Christmasy cover was something more than an inducement for readers to buy Dad extra shaving soap. In the national climate of 1963, thick with racial fear, Lois's angry icon insisted on several things: the split in our culture was showing; the notion of racial equality was a bad joke; the felicitations of this season-goodwill to all men, etc.-carried irony more than sentiment.

Prior to the advent of digital imaging, much of Fischer's photographic illustration and advertising work required complex montage and retouching, and ironically included May 1968 cover showing Richard Nixon with closed eyes submitting to having his face made up for television, over the cover line; "Nixon's last chance. (This time he'd better look right)."

After collaborating through the 1960s he and Lois, disputing who should be credited with the covers, including some falsely claimed by Lois, such as the one of St. Patrick's Cathedral, went their separate ways in the early 1970s. After Hayes left Esquire in 1973, Fischer gradually ceased working for the magazine but continued in advertising photography.

Fischer directed television commercials and taught as an adjunct professor at the Rochester Institute of Technology. A member of the Directors Guild of America, he also served as President of the Art Directors Club.

Fischer died on April 7, 2023, at the age of 98.

== Awards ==
- Mark Twain Journalism Award
- Cleo Award
- Art Directors Club gold and silver medals
- Augustus St. Gaudens Medal

== Collections ==
- Metropolitan Museum of Art (New York)
- Museum of Modern Art (New York)
- International Center of Photography (New York)
- George Eastman House (Rochester)
- Spencer Museum of Art (Lawrence)
- Victoria and Albert Museum (London)
- Tel Aviv Museum of Art (Tel Aviv)
- Metropolitan Opera Archives (New York)
- Library of Congress (Washington)
