= Seymour Krim =

American writer (1922–1989)

- Krim sitting on a stoop in the East Village
- Born: Seymour Monroe Krim; May 11, 1922; Manhattan, New York City, New York, U.S.
- Died: August 30, 1989 (aged 67); New York City, New York, U.S.
- Writing career
- Notable work: Views of a Nearsighted Cannoneer

Seymour Krim (May 11, 1922 – August 30, 1989) was an American author, editor and literary critic. In the 1950s and '60s, he contributed essays and journalistic pieces to The Village Voice, New York Herald Tribune, the Evergreen Review, Commentary, and Commonweal. Krim's best-known book was the 1961 essay collection, Views of a Nearsighted Cannoneer. With his "naked, introspective" prose style, he was often linked to Beat Generation writers and to New Journalism.

== Biography ==
Krim was born into a prosperous Jewish family in the Washington Heights neighborhood of Manhattan. He was orphaned at age ten after his father died of a heart attack and his mother committed suicide. For the next seven years, he was shuttled between relatives' homes. In 1939 he graduated from DeWitt Clinton High School in the Bronx, and then attended the University of North Carolina at Chapel Hill (UNC). He dropped out of UNC after one year and returned to New York City. During World War II, he worked for the Office of War Information, writing news stories.

His journalism career commenced in the summer of 1942 when The New Yorker hired him as a reporter. He worked intermittently for the magazine through 1945, but later publicly criticized it for its "cramped" editorial policy and resistance to new styles of writing.

In a 1960 essay, "Milton Klonsky, My Favorite Intellectual", Krim recounted his friendship, beginning in the late 1940s, with Milton Klonsky, a fellow Greenwich Village writer. Klonsky's self-confident persona as a Jewish intellectual provided a role model for Krim, who admired how Klonsky "didn't seem to operate under the sense of Yiddish shame and inferiority that crippled not only myself but so many of the middle-class Jewish kids who came from roughly my own uptown environment."

In the summer of 1955, Krim suffered a nervous breakdown. He was handcuffed and taken to Bellevue Hospital, and then sent to psychiatric clinics in Westchester and Long Island where he was given electroshock therapy. He wrote about this experience in his 1959 essay, "The Insanity Bit".

Krim said that the arrival of the Beat Generation "liberat[ed] him from the polite constraints" of the "rarefied world of the literary journals" of which he had been a part. Starting with his essay "Anti-Jazz" in The Village Voice in October 1957, Krim's freewheeling prose style became his trademark. He edited an anthology of Beat writing in 1960, and wrote the introduction to Jack Kerouac's novel Desolation Angels (1965).

Krim mainly supported himself with book reviews and literary criticism for publications such as The New York Times Book Review, Commonweal, Commentary, the Partisan Review, and The Hudson Review. He was a consulting editor to the Evergreen Review. In 1965 he joined the New York Herald Tribune's staff. Krim taught writing seminars at a number of universities in the United States and Israel. In the 1970s, he taught at the Iowa Writers' Workshop and at Columbia University.

His honors included the Longview Award for Literature (1960), a Guggenheim Fellowship (1976), and a Fulbright grant (1985).

After suffering health problems in the 1980s, including a severe heart attack in 1986, Krim committed suicide on August 30, 1989, in his one-room apartment on East 10th Street. The cause of death was an overdose of barbiturates. He left notes with instructions for those who would find him.

== Posthumous recognition ==
In the years following his death, Krim's work gained greater recognition. In a 1994 collection, The Art of the Personal Essay: An Anthology from the Classical Era to the Present, Phillip Lopate included Krim's essay, "For My Brothers and Sisters in the Failure Business". Lopate later said of Krim: "With the passage of time, Seymour Krim comes to seem more and more unique, essential—a classic American essayist. He still has the ability to shock us with his gutsy honesty and urgency."

Vivian Gornick, who called Krim "a Jewish Joan Didion," added "Failure Business" to her list of the "Ten Greatest Essays, Ever".

In his 1992 memoir, New York in the Fifties, Dan Wakefield recalled his early impressions of Krim:

I'd been following the jazzy, electric prose of Seymour Krim in the Voice; he used his personal experience as material – often like raw wounds – to comment on the literature, culture, and politics of the time. Krim was an unsung father of what was later called the New Journalism and his pieces from the fifties were collected at the end of the decade in Views of a Nearsighted Cannoneer, which had a real influence on other writers. He always worked out on the frontiers of trends and lingo; he coined the term "radical chic" before Tom Wolfe made it famous.... Krim's souped-up style was similar to Norman Mailer's nonfiction riffs, which were also appearing in the Voice in those days.

In a 1996 review of What's This Cat's Story? The Best of Seymour Krim, literary critic Irving Malin praised Krim's "brilliant, energetic prose rhythms."

In their 2001 volume Editors: The Best from Five Decades, Saul Bellow and Keith Botsford included Krim's essay, "What's This Cat's Story?". In 2010, Mark Cohen edited and wrote an introduction to a comprehensive anthology, Missing a Beat: The Rants and Regrets of Seymour Krim.

== Bibliography ==
- Krim, Seymour, ed. (1954). Manhattan: Stories from the Heart of a Great City. New York: Bantam Books. OCLC 4020510.
- ————, ed. (1960). The Beats. A Gold Medal Anthology. Greenwich, Connecticut: Fawcett Publications. LCCN 60-2137.
- Krim, Seymour (1968) [1961]. Views of a Nearsighted Cannoneer (New enlarged ed.). New York: E. P. Dutton & Co. LCCN 68-15662.
- ———— (1970). Shake It for the World, Smartass. New York: Dial Press. LCCN 74-80500.
- ———— (1974). You & Me: The Continuing One-on-One Odyssey of a Literary Gambler. New York: Holt, Rinehart and Winston. ISBN 978-0030109614.
- ————, ed. (1988). NO!ART Pin-Ups, Excrement, Protest, Jew-Art. Berlin: Edition Hundertmark. LCCN 90-198136. Co-edited with Boris Lurie. In German and English.
- Brooks, Peggy, ed. (1991). What's This Cat's Story? The Best of Seymour Krim. Saint Paul, Minnesota: Paragon House. ISBN 978-1557784704.
- Cohen, Mark, ed. (2010). Missing a Beat: The Rants and Regrets of Seymour Krim. Syracuse, New York: Syracuse University Press. ISBN 978-0815609483.
