= A Writer's Life =

2006 book by Gay Talese

- Author: Gay Talese
- Language: English
- Subject: Autobiography
- Genre: Non-fiction
- Publisher: Alfred A. Knopf
- Publication date: 2006
- Publication place: United States
- Media type: Print (hardback & paperback)
- Pages: 448 pp (first edition, hardback)
- ISBN: 0-679-41096-1 (first edition, hardback)
- OCLC: 62118423
- Dewey Decimal: 808.0092 B 22
- LC Class: PN4874.T216 A3 2006

A Writer's Life is a 2006 autobiography by Gay Talese. The book focuses on many of the stories that Talese attempted to tell, but failed, such as spending six months working on a story about John and Lorena Bobbitt for The New Yorker only to have the piece rejected by New Yorker editor Tina Brown.

== Bibliography ==
- A Writer's Life. Random House, Inc. 2007. ISBN 978-0-8129-7728-8.
