= Fame and Obscurity =

1970 book by Gay Talese

- First edition
- Author: Gay Talese
- Language: English
- Subject: Biographies
- Genre: Non-fiction
- Publisher: The World Publishing Company
- Publication date: 1970
- Publication place: United States
- Media type: Print (Hardback & Paperback)

Fame and Obscurity: A Book About New York, a Bridge, and Celebrities on the Edge was a 1970 book by Gay Talese. The book was a collection of many of Talese's works for Esquire about New York City, and also includes his most famous celebrity profiles: "Joe Louis: The King as a Middle-aged Man", "Frank Sinatra Has a Cold" and "The Silent Season of a Hero".
