= Vena, Calabria =

Vena
- Village
- Vena di Maida
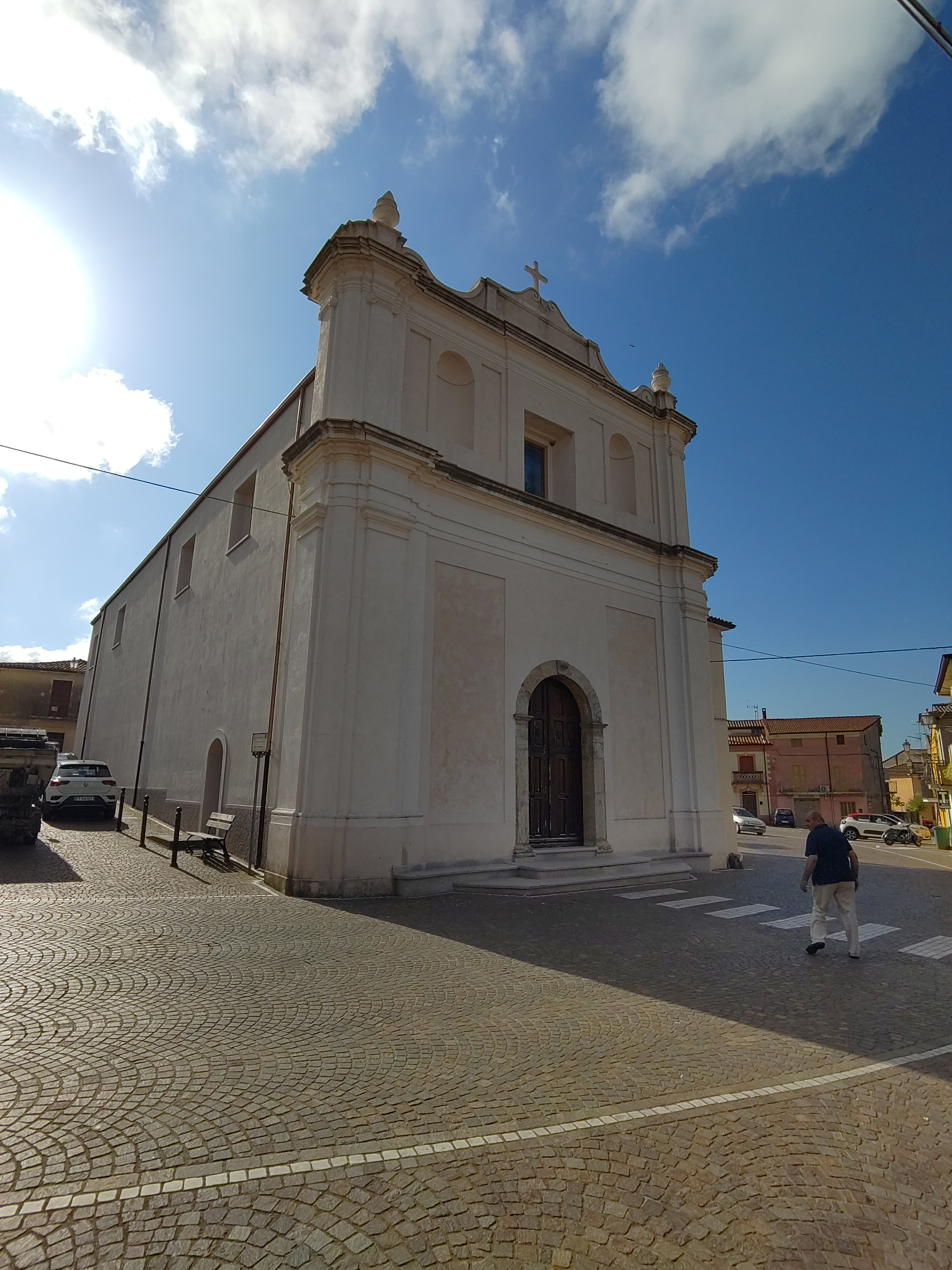
- Church of Vena in 2023

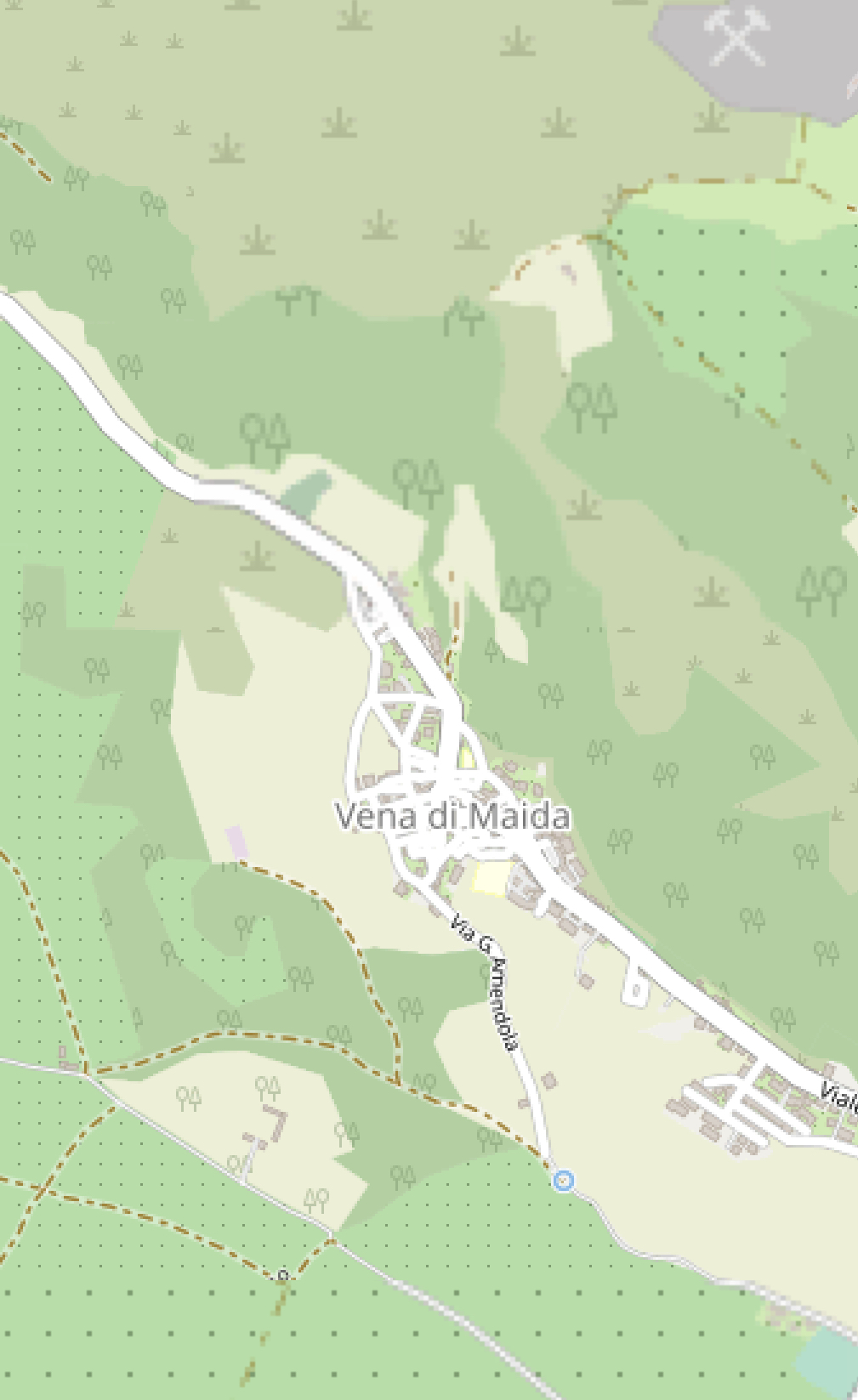
- Map of Vena

- Location within Calabria Location within Italy
- Coordinates: 38°53′18″N 16°24′27″E
- Country: Italy
- Region: Calabria
- Province: Catanzaro
- Municipality: Maida

Area
  - Total: 0.27000 km^{2} (0.10425 sq mi)

Population (2011)
  - Total: 879
  - Density: 3,260/km^{2} (8,430/sq mi)

Vena di Maida, also known as Vena, is a village in the Province of Catanzaro, Calabria, Italy, administratively a frazione of the Comune of Maida. It has a population of 879 making it a village. Vena is 242 meters above sea level.

Family names 1758-1762

Brescia, Falvo, Bubba, Argirò, Comità, Barberio, Santo, Rania, Brailla, Petruzza, Dattilo, Bardascino, Fiocca, Brundo, Spada, Scalise, Pallaria, Scamardì, Figlia, Boca, Guzzo, Miceli, Colistra, Reto, Pallone, Sciumbata, Grande, Caraffa, Pascuzzo, Rizzuto, Pisano, Sergi, Torchia, Vivacqua, Angotti, Pititto.

1790-1795

Barberio, Boca, Brailla, Bubba, Cappello, Comità, Conestabile, Del Giudice, Figlia, Fiocca, Grande, Guzzo, Lo Schiavo, Miceli, Olivadoti, Pallaria, Pallone, Peta, Petruzza, Pileggi, Reto, Santo, Saraceno, Scalise, Sciumbata, Spada, Suppa, Torchia, Varano.

1865-1880 Scalise, Gigliotti, Fabrizio, Sacco, Calogero, Bruni, Cantafio, Chiefalo, Siniscalco, Pileggi, Gallello, Fodaro, Mastria, Mauro, Gatto, Saraceno, Gangale, Del Giudice, Mazzei, Degiorgio, Ciliberto, Loscavo, Paonessa, Ferragina, Cuda, Pellegrino, Cusentino, Migliaccio, Pulerà, Cappellano, Rollo, Mazza, Stranieri, Guarna, Bruno, Sulla, Servello, Cappello, Migliazzo, Faga, Gualtieri, Murello, Scerbo, Cristofaro, Mirigliano, Pulitano, Zuppa, Donato, Governa, Arcuri, Crocifissa.
