= The Kingdom and the Power =

1969 book by Gay Talese

The Kingdom and the Power: Behind the Scenes at The New York Times: The Institution That Influences the World
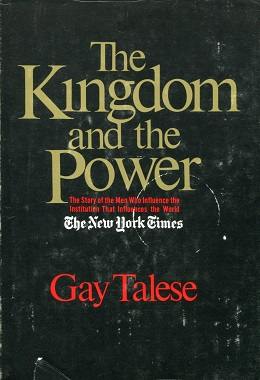
- First edition
- Author: Gay Talese
- Language: English
- Publisher: World Publishing Co.
- Publication date: 1969
- Publication place: United States

The Kingdom and the Power: Behind the Scenes at The New York Times: The Institution That Influences the World is a 1969 book by Gay Talese about the inner workings of The New York Times, the newspaper where Talese had worked for 12 years. The book was originally subtitled "The Story of The Men Who Influence The Institution That Influences the World." The book is credited with starting the trend of "media books" as noted by Portfolio at the New York University School of Journalism, books "portraying the inner-workings of a media establishment, turning the tables on the people who write and report the news, and making them the subject."

== Background ==
Talese came to The New York Times in 1953 fresh out of college as an entry-level copyboy. After spending two years in the military, Talese became a sports reporter, statehouse reporter, obituarist and a general news reporter before quitting The New York Times in 1965.

Talese had already begun regularly contributing to Esquire and had received particular acclaim for his 1962 article "Joe Louis: The King as a Middle-aged Man" about boxer Joe Louis. In 1966 he wrote "Frank Sinatra Has a Cold", a profile of the singer, one of his best regarded works. This year he also wrote an article on Clifton Daniel the managing editor of his former employer The New York Times. Talese believed there was a bigger story about the paper, and began researching and writing The Kingdom and the Power. The results were first published in Harper's Magazine's January and February issues in 1969, and published by World Publishing later that year.

== Summary ==
While Talese's book outlined the history of the paper back to Adolph Ochs's 1896 takeover of the then-failing paper, the focus was on The Times between 1945 and the 1960s. The Washington bureau of The Times sometimes was seen as the center of the paper's power, but after the death of publisher Orvil Dryfoos in 1963, Talese saw this center as shifting to New York City under Arthur Ochs "Punch" Sulzberger beginning in 1963.

The title of the book indicated the thrust of Talese's thesis. The Kingdom was The New York Times newsroom, and the Power was the influence the paper wielded, particularly in its interpretation of the paper's famous motto "All the News That's Fit to Print". Talese looked at the personalities driving Times news coverage such as managing editor Clifton Daniel, executive editor James Reston, rising star A. M. Rosenthal and Punch Sulzberger. Time found Talese's portrayal of the highly respected Reston as particularly critical. Talese described Reston as a "Times-man in the old sense, a man emotionally committed to the institution as a way of life, a religion, a cult."

== Legacy ==
The book became Talese's first bestseller. But the inner-workings of an American newsroom was seen as an odd choice for a book. One critic wrote that "Talese adopts a viewpoint that is extraordinarily inbred. He ranges through the minds and psyches of his protagonists, but we almost never step outside the confines of the offices on 229 West 43 Street" where the Times was headquartered.

Talese, however, defended his choice of subject matter, telling Time, "I consider The New York Times news. Fascinating news. It has been sitting in judgment of America for more than a century and it, too, should be looked at in detail with the same objectivity."

The book won a Christopher Award and has continued to receive acclaim. Its model of journalism about journalism has become increasingly common, to the point that reporting about newspapers is no longer considered unusual. In 2006, Roger Ailes, president of the Fox News Channel, said The Kingdom and The Power was one of the best five books about journalism ever written.
