= Unto the Sons =

1992 book by Gay Talese

- First edition
- Author: Gay Talese
- Language: English
- Genre: Non-fiction
- Publisher: Alfred A. Knopf
- Publication date: February 1992
- Publication place: United States
- Media type: Print (hardcover and Paperback)
- Pages: 635 pp (first edition, hardback)
- ISBN: 0-679-41034-1 (first edition, hardback)
- OCLC: 24247007
- Dewey Decimal: 973/.0451 20
- LC Class: E184.I8 T35 1992

Unto the Sons is a memoir written by Gay Talese and published by Alfred A. Knopf in 1992. The book traces the origins of Talese's own family, beginning with his great-grandfather in Maida, Italy, his grandfather who immigrated to Pennsylvania and Talese's father, who immigrated to the United States separately following World War I.

Christopher Lehmann-Haupt of The New York Times (where Talese previously worked as a reporter) remarked that Talese had "dug so deep for his roots it's a wonder he didn't come out in China." He had mixed feelings about the work, writing that Talese's stories could be rich, vivid, and emotionally compelling but could also sometimes devolve into long, irrelevant tangents.
