= Harold Hayes =

American journalist (1926–1989)

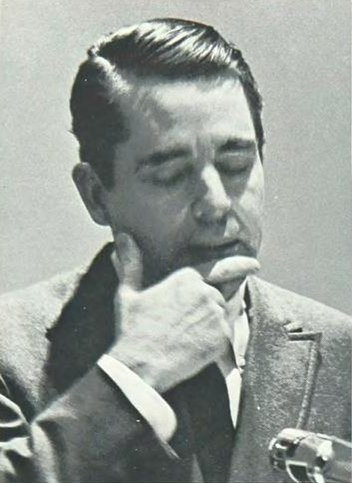
- Hayes in 1968 or 1969
- Born: Harold Thomas Pace Hayes; April 18, 1926; Elkin, North Carolina, U.S.
- Died: April 5, 1989 (aged 62); Los Angeles, California, U.S.
- Education: Wake Forest College (BA)
- Occupations: Esquire editor, writer
- Notable credit: The Dark Romance of Dian Fossey
- Spouses: Susan Meredith Hayes; Judy Kessler Hayes
- Children: 2

Harold Thomas Pace Hayes (April 18, 1926 – April 5, 1989) was an American journalist and writer best known as an editor for Esquire magazine from 1963 to 1973. He was a main architect of the New Journalism movement.

== Biography ==
Born April 18, 1926, in Elkin, North Carolina, Harold Hayes earned an undergraduate degree from Wake Forest College, worked for United Press in Atlanta, served in the Marines, moved to New York City to work for a small magazine called Pageant, and wound up in 1956 at Esquire, where he battled with several other young editors, among them Clay Felker (who went on to found New York magazine), for the job of top editor. Hayes won that contest, becoming first managing editor and then, on October 1, 1963, editor.

After Hayes left Esquire in 1973, he hosted a public television interview program, worked briefly as an editorial producer for (and, with Robert Hughes, the first cohost of) 20/20, became editorial director of CBS magazines and then editor of California Magazine. He wrote three books on Africa—The Last Place on Earth, Three Levels of Time, and The Dark Romance of Dian Fossey, the last developed from a November 1986 essay in Life magazine and later a basis for the 1988 film Gorillas in the Mist.

Hayes' personal papers are stored at the Z. Smith Reynolds Library at Wake Forest University in Winston-Salem, North Carolina. The papers include correspondence with many of the famous writers Hayes worked with throughout his career.

=== Death ===
He died in 1989 in Los Angeles, California, 13 days before his 63rd birthday, leaving a widow, Judy Kessler Hayes (he was divorced from his first wife, Susan Hayes), a daughter, Carrie O'Brien, and a son, Thomas.

== Work ==
As an editor, Hayes appreciated bold writing and points of view, favoring writers with a flair for ferreting out the spirit of the time—writers like Gay Talese, Tom Wolfe, Norman Mailer, Michael Herr, John Sack, Gore Vidal, William F. Buckley, Garry Wills, Gina Berriault, and Nora Ephron. His editorial risks extended into graphic innovation by publishing Carl Fischer and George Lois's iconic covers like Sonny Liston wearing a Santa Claus hat, Andy Warhol disappearing in a can of Campbell's soup, and Muhammad Ali posing as St. Sebastian. Fiction editor Gordon Lish brought in stories by Raymond Carver. Diane Arbus contributed photographs. Robert Benton and David Newman thought up the Dubious Achievement Awards (and in their spare time wrote the screenplay for the 1967 movie Bonnie and Clyde).

More a general-interest magazine than a men's magazine then, Esquire was "a big, unruly book, its contents unbound by formulaic notions of what belonged there," Carol Polsgrove wrote in It Wasn't Pretty, Folks, But Didn't We Have Fun? (1995), her history of the Hayes era at Esquire.

Hayes edited an anthology of Esquire's best writing of the 1960s called Smiling Through the Apocalypse, which was published in 1971. In 2013, his son Tom produced and directed a documentary about his father, similarly titled Smiling Through the Apocalypse: Esquire in the 60s, featuring interviews with many of the surviving writers under Harold Hayes' tutelage. The 97' film is available on iTunes and Amazon.
