= The Gold Standard (newspaper) =

American military newspaper

- Type: Weekly newspaper
- Website: www.fkgoldstandard.com

The Gold Standard (previously known as the Inside the Turret and Turret) was a weekly newspaper published by the News Enterprise from 1948 to 2018. Designed to serve military and civilian personnel on the U.S. Army post Fort Knox, it was produced under a partnership arrangement with the Army, though was editorially independent.
