= Nan A. Talese =

American editor and publisher

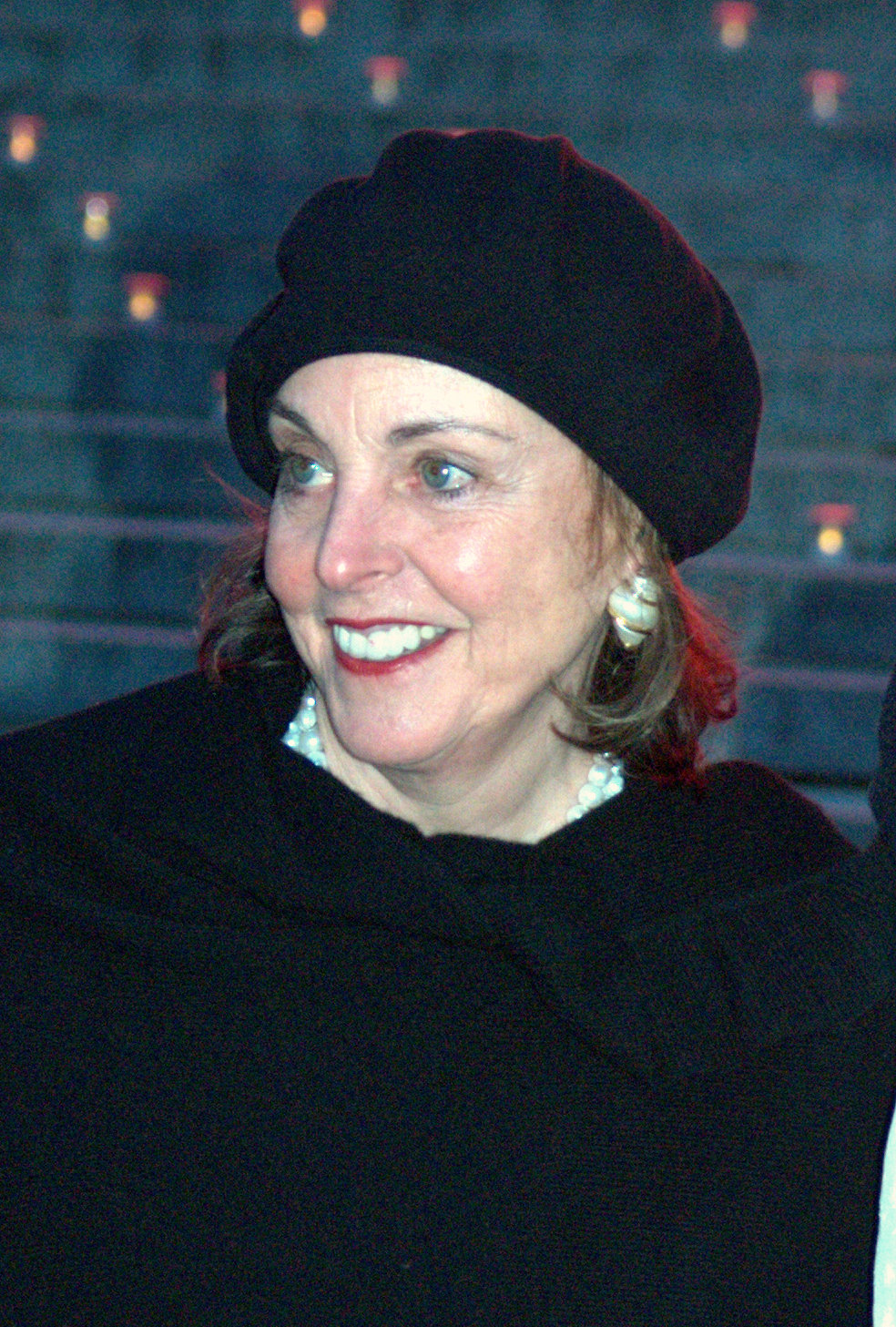
- Talese in 2009
- Born: Nan Ahearn; December 19, 1933 (age 92); Rye, New York
- Occupations: Editor, publisher
- Spouse: Gay Talese (m. 1959)
- Children: 2

Nan Ahearn Talese (née Ahearn; born December 19, 1933) is a retired American editor, and a veteran of the New York publishing industry. Talese was the senior vice president of Doubleday. From 1990 to 2020, Talese was the publisher and editorial director of her own imprint, Nan A. Talese/Doubleday, publishing authors such as Pat Conroy, Ian McEwan, and Peter Ackroyd.

== Early life ==
Nan Irene Ahearn was born in 1933 to Thomas J. and Suzanne Ahearn of Rye, New York. Her father was a banker. She attended the Rye Country Day School and graduated from the Convent of the Sacred Heart in Greenwich, Connecticut. She was a debutante presented at the 1951 Westchester Cotillion. She graduated from Manhattanville College in 1955.

She was working at Random House when she married the writer Gay Talese in 1959. They have two daughters. Gay Talese began work on a memoir of their relationship in 2007.

== Career ==
Talese began her career at Random House, first as a proofreader and later as the publisher's first female literary editor. She later worked at Simon & Schuster and Houghton Mifflin. Talese has edited many notable authors, including Pat Conroy, Margaret Atwood, Deirdre Bair, Ian McEwan, Jennifer Egan, Antonia Fraser, Barry Unsworth, Valerie Martin, and Thomas Keneally. Talese's imprint published James Frey's fabricated memoir, A Million Little Pieces. She was confronted by Oprah Winfrey on television after the veracity of the author's work was challenged.

In 2005, Talese was the first recipient of the Center for Fiction’s Maxwell Perkins Award, given to "honor the work of an editor, publisher, or agent, who over the course of his or her career has discovered, nurtured, and championed writers of fiction in the United States." The award is “dedicated to Maxwell Perkins, in celebration of his legacy as one of the country’s most important editors."

In 2006, Talese published a small edition of mostly blank pages under the title of Useless America by Jim Crace, whose book The Pesthouse was forthcoming from her imprint but which did not yet have a title. Useless America was inspired by a "phantom" book of Crace's which had been listed on Amazon in error. The title came from the line "This used to be America", which Crace had planned to use to begin Pesthouse. The book, now scarce, commands a high resale value.
