= Candide =

1759 satirical novella by Voltaire

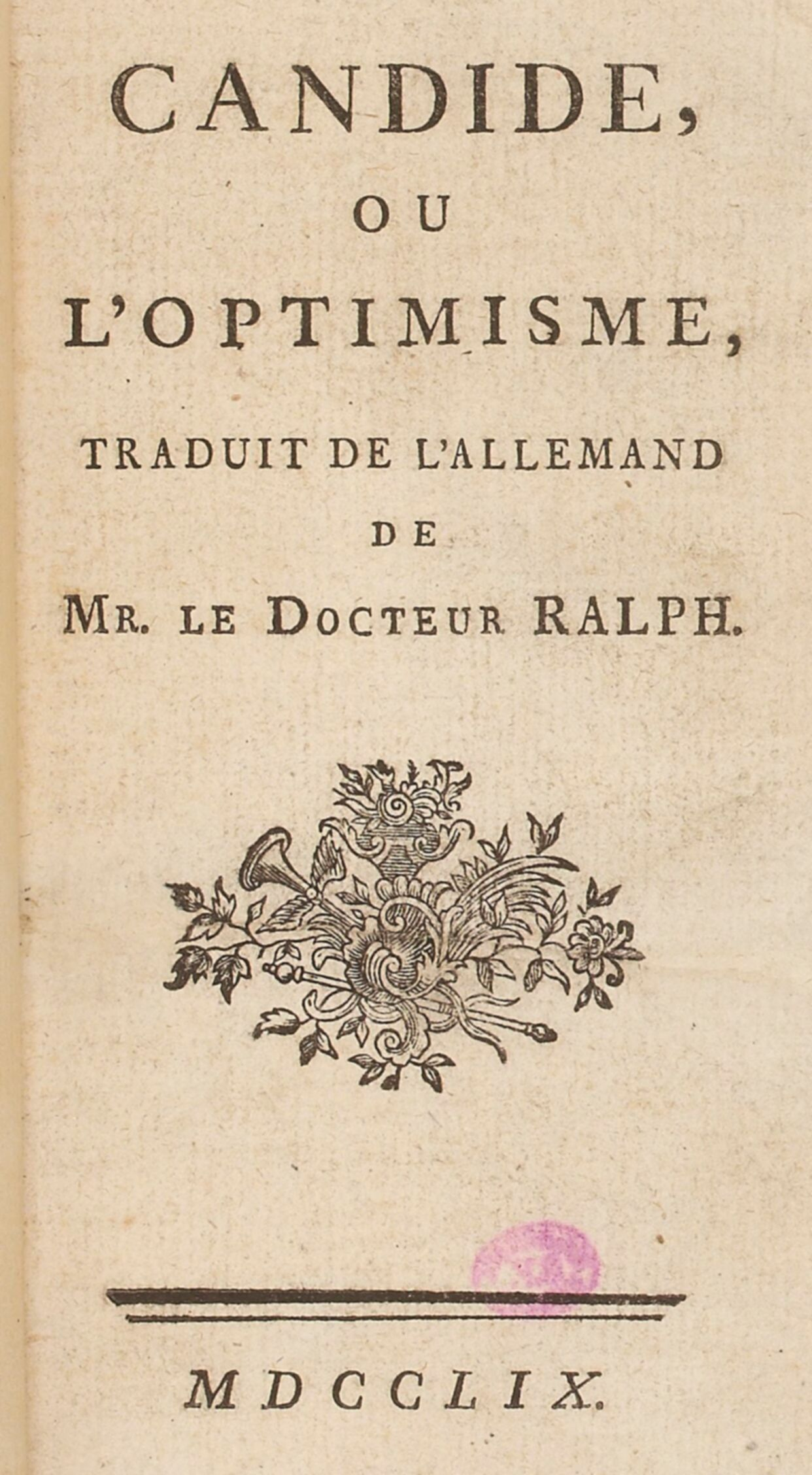
- The title-page of the 1759 edition published by Cramer in Geneva, which reads, "Candide, or Optimism, translated from the German of Dr. Ralph."
- Author: Voltaire
- Original title: Candide, ou l'Optimisme
- Language: French
- Genre: Conte philosophique; Satire; Picaresque novel; Bildungsroman; Tragedy
- Publisher: 1759: Cramer, Marc-Michel Rey, Jean Nourse, Lambert, and others
- Publication date: January 1759
- Publication place: France

Candide, ou l'Optimisme (/kɒnˈdiːd/ kon-DEED or /kɑːnˈdiːd/ kahn-DEED, French: [kɑ̃did]) is a French satire written by Voltaire, a philosopher of the Age of Enlightenment, first published in 1759. The novella has been widely translated, with English versions titled Candidus: or, All for the Best (1759); Candide: or, The Optimist (1762); and Candide: Optimism (1947). A young man, Candide, lives a sheltered life in an Edenic paradise, being indoctrinated with Leibnizian optimism by his mentor, Professor Pangloss. This lifestyle is abruptly ended, followed by Candide's slow and painful disillusionment as he witnesses and experiences great hardships in the world. Voltaire concludes Candide with, if not rejecting Leibnizian optimism outright, advocating a deeply practical precept, "we must cultivate our garden", in lieu of the Leibnizian mantra of Pangloss, "all is for the best" in the "best of all possible worlds".

Candide is characterized by its tone as well as its erratic, fantastical, and fast-moving plot. A picaresque novel with a story akin to a serious bildungsroman, it parodies many adventure and romance clichés, in a tone that is bitter and matter-of-fact. The events discussed are often based on historical happenings. As philosophers of Voltaire's day contended with the problem of evil, so does Candide, albeit more directly and humorously. Voltaire ridicules religion, theologians, governments, armies, philosophies, and philosophers. Through Candide, he assaults Leibniz and his optimism.

Candide has enjoyed both great success and great scandal. Immediately after its secretive publication, the book was widely banned on the grounds of blasphemy and sedition. However, the novel has inspired many later authors and artists; today, Candide is considered Voltaire's magnum opus and is often listed as part of the Western canon. It is among the most frequently taught works of French literature. Martin Seymour-Smith listed Candide as one of the 100 most influential books ever written.

== Historical and literary background ==
Several historical events inspired Voltaire to write Candide, most notably the publication of Leibniz's "Monadology", the Seven Years' War, and the 1755 Lisbon earthquake. Both of the latter catastrophes are frequently referred to in Candide. The earthquake, tsunami, and resulting fires of All Saints' Day had a strong influence on theologians of the day and on Voltaire, who was himself disillusioned by them. It had an especially large effect on the contemporary doctrine of optimism, a philosophical system founded on the theodicy of Gottfried Wilhelm Leibniz, which insisted on God's benevolence in spite of such events. This concept is often put in the form, "all is for the best in the best of all possible worlds" (French: Tout est pour le mieux dans le meilleur des mondes possibles). Philosophers had trouble fitting the horrors of this earthquake into their optimistic world view.

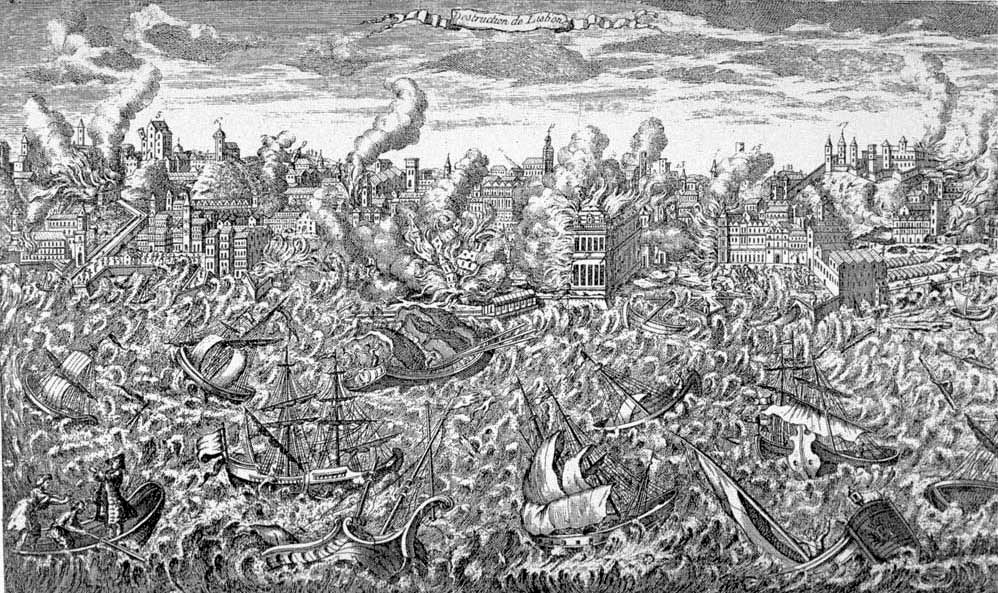
This 1755 copper engraving shows the ruins of Lisbon in flames and a tsunami overwhelming the ships in the harbour.

Voltaire actively rejected Leibnizian optimism after the natural disaster, convinced that if this were the best possible world, it should surely be better than it is. In both Candide and Poème sur le désastre de Lisbonne ("Poem on the Lisbon Disaster"), Voltaire attacks this optimist belief, sarcastically describing the catastrophe as one of the most horrible disasters "in the best of all possible worlds". Immediately after the earthquake, unreliable rumours circulated around Europe, sometimes overestimating the severity of the event. Ira Wade, a noted expert on Voltaire and Candide, has analyzed which sources Voltaire might have referenced, speculating that Voltaire's primary source was the 1755 work Relation historique du Tremblement de Terre survenu à Lisbonne by Ange Goudar.

Apart from such events, contemporaneous stereotypes of the German personality may have been a source of inspiration for the text, as they were for Simplicius Simplicissimus, a 1669 satirical picaresque novel written by Hans Jakob Christoffel von Grimmelshausen and inspired by the Thirty Years' War. The protagonist of this novel, supposed to embody stereotypically German characteristics, is quite similar to the protagonist of Candide. These stereotypes, according to Voltaire biographer Alfred Owen Aldridge, include "extreme credulousness or sentimental simplicity", two of Candide's and Simplicius's defining qualities. Aldridge writes, "Since Voltaire admitted familiarity with fifteenth-century German authors who used a bold and buffoonish style, it is quite possible that he knew Simplicissimus as well."

A satirical and parodic precursor of Candide, Jonathan Swift's Gulliver's Travels (1726) is one of Candide's closest literary relatives. This satire tells the story of "a gullible ingenue", Gulliver, who (like Candide) travels to several "remote nations" and is hardened by the many misfortunes which befall him. As evidenced by similarities between the two books, Voltaire probably drew upon Gulliver's Travels for inspiration while writing Candide. Other probable sources of inspiration for Candide are Télémaque (1699) by François Fénelon and Cosmopolite (1753) by Louis-Charles Fougeret de Monbron. Candide's parody of the bildungsroman is probably based on Télémaque, which includes the prototypical parody of the tutor on whom Pangloss may have been partly based. Likewise, Monbron's protagonist undergoes a disillusioning series of travels similar to those of Candide.

== Creation ==
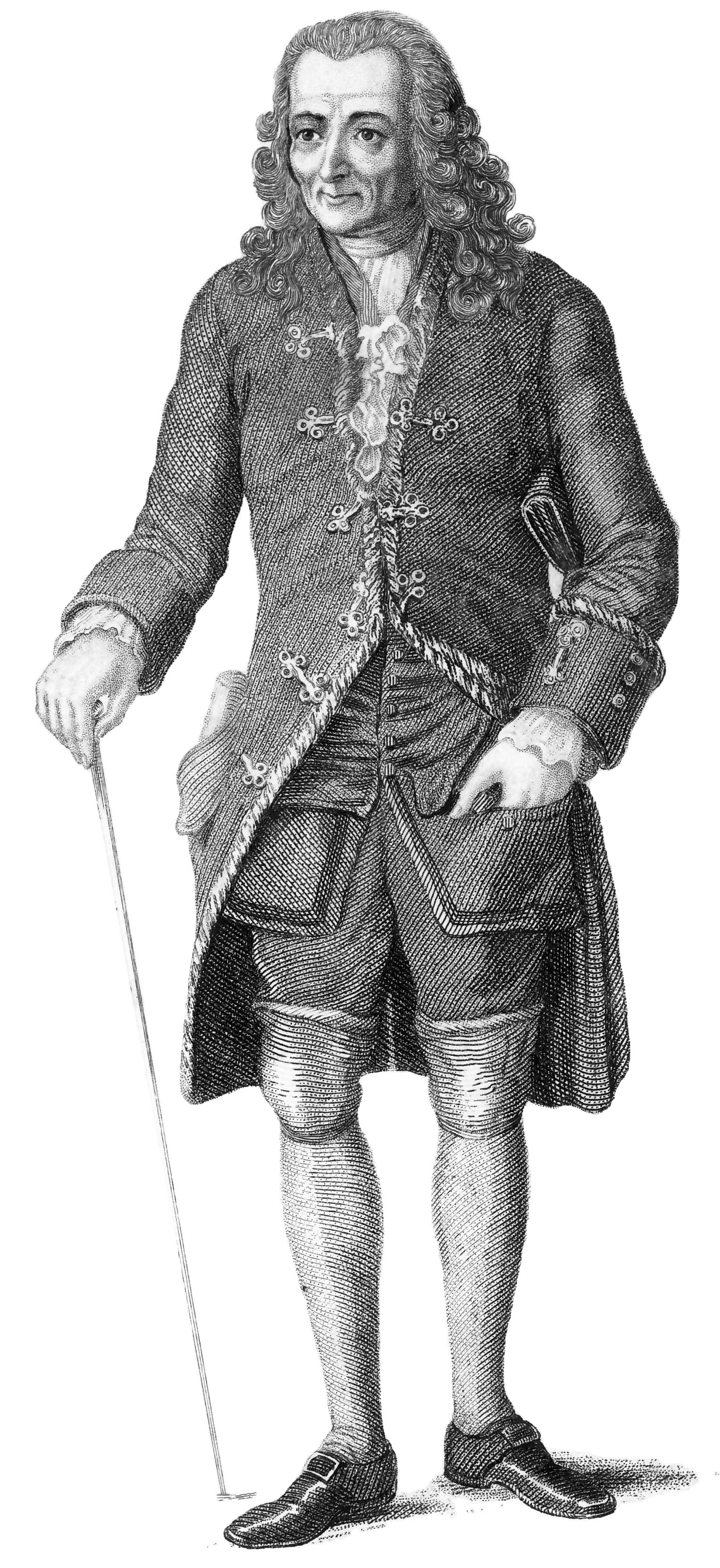
Engraving of Voltaire published as the frontispiece to an 1843 edition of his Dictionnaire philosophique

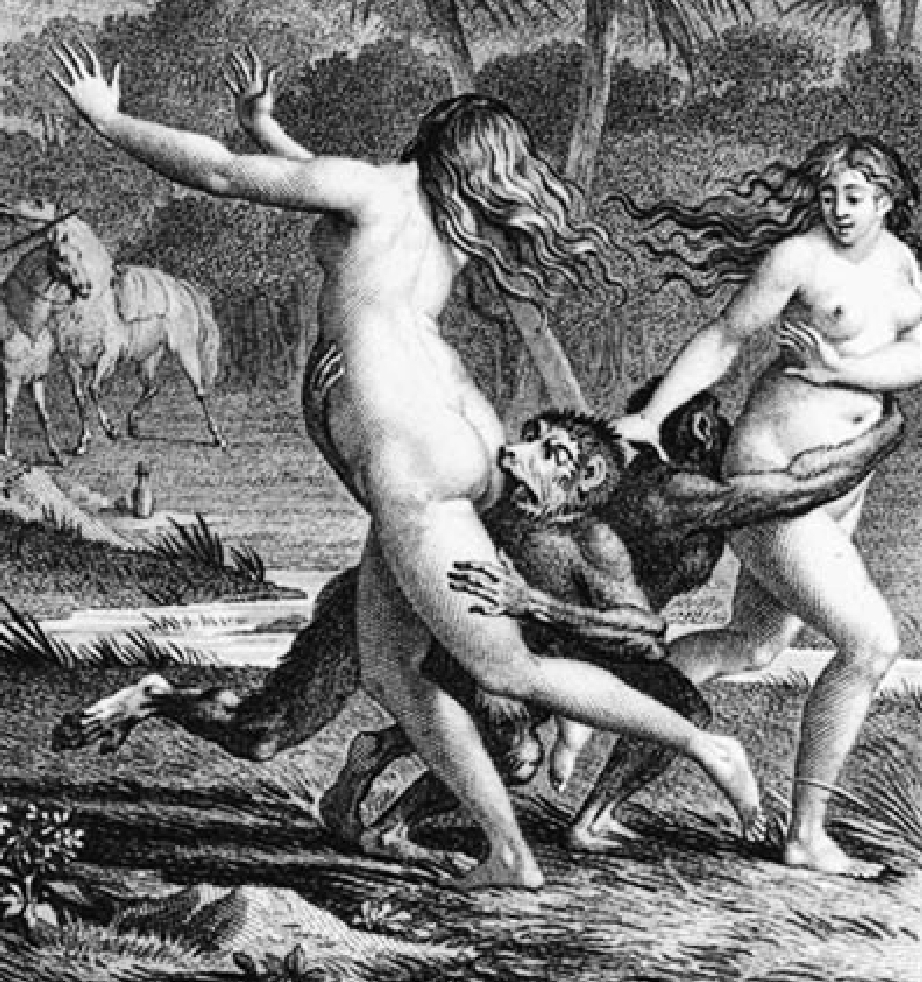
1803 illustration of the two monkeys chasing their lovers. Candide shoots the monkeys, thinking they are attacking the women.

By the time of the Lisbon earthquake, Voltaire was already a well-established author. Candide became part of his large, diverse body of philosophical, political, and artistic works expressing these views. It became a model for the eighteenth- and early nineteenth-century novels called the contes philosophiques. This genre included previous works of his such as Zadig and Micromegas.

It is unknown exactly when Voltaire wrote Candide. Scholars estimate that it was primarily composed in late 1758 and begun as early as 1757. Voltaire is believed to have written a portion of it while living at Les Délices near Geneva and also while visiting Charles Théodore, the Elector-Palatinate, at Schwetzingen for three weeks in the summer of 1758. Despite solid evidence for these claims, a popular legend persists that he wrote Candide in three days. This idea is probably based on a misreading of the 1885 work La Vie intime de Voltaire aux Délices et à Ferney by Lucien Pereyand Gaston Maugras.

There is only one extant manuscript of Candide that was written before the work's 1759 publication, discovered in 1956 by Wade and since named the La Vallière Manuscript. It is believed to have been sent, chapter by chapter, by Voltaire to the Duke and Duchess La Vallière in the autumn of 1758. The manuscript was sold to the Bibliothèque de l'Arsenal in the late eighteenth century, where it remained undiscovered for almost two hundred years. The La Vallière Manuscript, the most original and authentic of all surviving copies of Candide, was probably dictated by Voltaire to his secretary, Jean-Louis Wagnière, then edited directly. In addition to this manuscript, there is believed to have been another one, copied by Wagnière for the Elector Charles-Théodore, who hosted Voltaire during the summer of 1758. The existence of this copy was first postulated by Norman L. Torrey in 1929. If it exists, it remains undiscovered.

Voltaire published Candide simultaneously in five countries no later than 15 January 1759, although the exact date is uncertain. Seventeen versions of Candide from 1759, in the original French, are known today, and there has been great controversy over which is the earliest. More versions were published in other languages: Candide was translated once into Italian and thrice into English that same year. The complicated science of calculating the relative publication dates of all of the versions of Candide is described at length in Wade's article "The First Edition of Candide: A Problem of Identification". The publication process was extremely secretive, probably the "most clandestine work of the century", because of the book's obviously illicit and irreverent content. The greatest number of copies of Candide were published concurrently in Geneva by Cramer, in Amsterdam by Marc-Michel Rey, in London by Jean Nourse, and in Paris by Lambert.

Candide underwent one major revision after its initial publication, in addition to some minor ones. In 1761, a version of Candide was published that included, along with several minor changes, a major addition by Voltaire to the twenty-second chapter, a section that had been thought weak by the Duke of Vallière. The English title of this edition was Candide, or Optimism, Translated from the German of Dr. Ralph. With the additions found in the Doctor's pocket when he died at Minden, in the Year of Grace 1759. The last edition of Candide authorised by Voltaire was the one included in Cramer's 1775 edition of his complete works, known as l'édition encadrée, in reference to the border or frame around each page.

Voltaire strongly opposed the inclusion of illustrations in his works, as he stated in a 1778 letter to the writer and publisher Charles Joseph Panckoucke:

Je crois que des Estampes seraient fort inutiles. Ces colifichets n'ont jamais été admis dans les éditions de Cicéron, de Virgile et d'Horace. (I believe that these illustrations would be quite useless. These baubles have never been allowed in the works of Cicero, Virgil and Horace.)

Despite this protest, two sets of illustrations for Candide were produced by the French artist Jean-Michel Moreau le Jeune. The first version was done, at Moreau's own expense, in 1787 and included in Kehl's publication of that year, Oeuvres Complètes de Voltaire. Four images were drawn by Moreau for this edition and were engraved by Pierre-Charles Baquoy. The second version, in 1803, consisted of seven drawings by Moreau which were transposed by multiple engravers. The twentieth-century modern artist Paul Klee stated that it was while reading Candide that he discovered his own artistic style. Klee illustrated the work, and his drawings were published in a 1920 version edited by Kurt Wolff.

== List of characters ==
=== Main characters ===
- Candide: The title character. The illegitimate son of the sister of the Baron of Thunder-ten-Tronckh. In love with Cunégonde.
- Cunégonde: The daughter of the Baron of Thunder-ten-Tronckh. In love with Candide.
- Professor Pangloss: The royal educator of the court of the baron. Described as "the greatest philosopher of the Holy Roman Empire".
- The Old Woman: Cunégonde's maid while she is the mistress of Don Issachar and the Grand Inquisitor of Portugal. Flees with Candide and Cunégonde to the New World. Illegitimate daughter of Pope Urban X.
- Cacambo: Born from a Mestizo father and an Indigenous mother. Lived half his life in Spain and half in Latin America. Candide's valet while in America.
- Martin: Dutch amateur philosopher and Manichaean. Meets Candide in Suriname, travels with him afterwards.
- The Baron of Thunder-ten-Tronckh: Brother of Cunégonde. Is seemingly killed by the Bulgarians, but becomes a Jesuit in Paraguay. Disapproves of Candide and Cunégonde's marriage.

=== Secondary characters ===
- The baron and baroness of Thunder-ten-Tronckh: Father and mother of Cunégonde and the second baron. Both slain by the Bulgars.
- The king of the Bulgars: Frederick II
- Jacques the Anabaptist: Dutch manufacturer who takes Candide in after his escape from the Prussian Army. Drowns in the port of Lisbon after saving a sailor's life.
- Don Issachar: Jewish banker in Portugal. Cunégonde becomes his mistress, shared with the Grand Inquisitor of Portugal. Killed by Candide.
- The Grand Inquisitor of Portugal: Sentences Candide and Pangloss at the auto-da-fé. Cunégonde is his mistress jointly with Don Issachar. Killed by Candide.
- Don Fernando d'Ibarra y Figueroa y Mascarenes y Lampourdos y Souza: Spanish governor of Buenos Aires. Wants Cunégonde as a mistress.
- The king of El Dorado, who helps Candide and Cacambo out of El Dorado, lets them pick gold from the grounds, and makes them rich.
- Mynheer Vanderdendur: Dutch ship captain/pirate and slave holder. Offers to take Candide from America to France for 30,000 gold coins, but then departs without him, stealing most of his riches. Dies after his ship sinks.
- The abbot of Périgord: Befriends Candide and Martin in the hopes of scamming them. Tries to have them arrested.
- The marchioness of Parolignac: Parisian wench who takes an elaborate title.
- The scholar: One of the guests of the "marchioness". Argues with Candide about art.
- Paquette: A chambermaid from Thunder-ten-Tronckh who gave Pangloss syphilis after getting it herself from her Franciscan confessor. After the slaying by the Bulgars, works as a prostitute in Venice and becomes entangled with Friar Giroflée.
- Friar Giroflée: Theatine friar. In love with the prostitute Paquette.
- Signor Pococurante: A Venetian noble. Candide and Martin visit his estate, where he discusses his disdain of most of the canon of great art.
- In an inn in Venice, Candide and Martin dine with six men who turn out to be deposed monarchs:
  - Ahmed III
  - Ivan VI of Russia
  - Charles Edward Stuart
  - Augustus III of Poland
  - Stanisław Leszczyński
  - Theodore of Corsica

== Synopsis ==
Candide contains thirty episodic chapters, which may be grouped into two main schemes: one consists of two divisions, separated by the protagonist's hiatus in El Dorado; the other consists of three parts, each defined by its geographical setting. By the former scheme, the first half of Candide constitutes the rising action and the last part the resolution. This view is supported by the strong theme of travel and quest, reminiscent of adventure and picaresque novels, which tend to employ such a dramatic structure. By the latter scheme, the thirty chapters may be grouped into three parts each comprising ten chapters and defined by locale: I–X are set in Europe, XI–XX are set in the Americas, and XXI–XXX are set in Europe and the Ottoman Empire. The plot summary that follows uses this second format and includes Voltaire's additions of 1761.

=== Chapters I–X ===
The tale of Candide begins in the castle of the Baron Thunder-ten-Tronckh in Westphalia, home to the Baron's daughter, Lady Cunégonde; his bastard nephew, Candide; a tutor, Pangloss; a chambermaid, Paquette; and the rest of the Baron's family. The protagonist, Candide, is romantically attracted to Cunégonde. He is a young man of "the most unaffected simplicity" (l'esprit le plus simple), whose face is "the true index of his mind" (sa physionomie annonçait son âme). Dr. Pangloss, professor of "métaphysico-théologo-cosmolonigologie" (English: "metaphysico-theologo-cosmolonigology") and self-proclaimed optimist, teaches his pupils that they live in the "best of all possible worlds" and that "all is for the best".

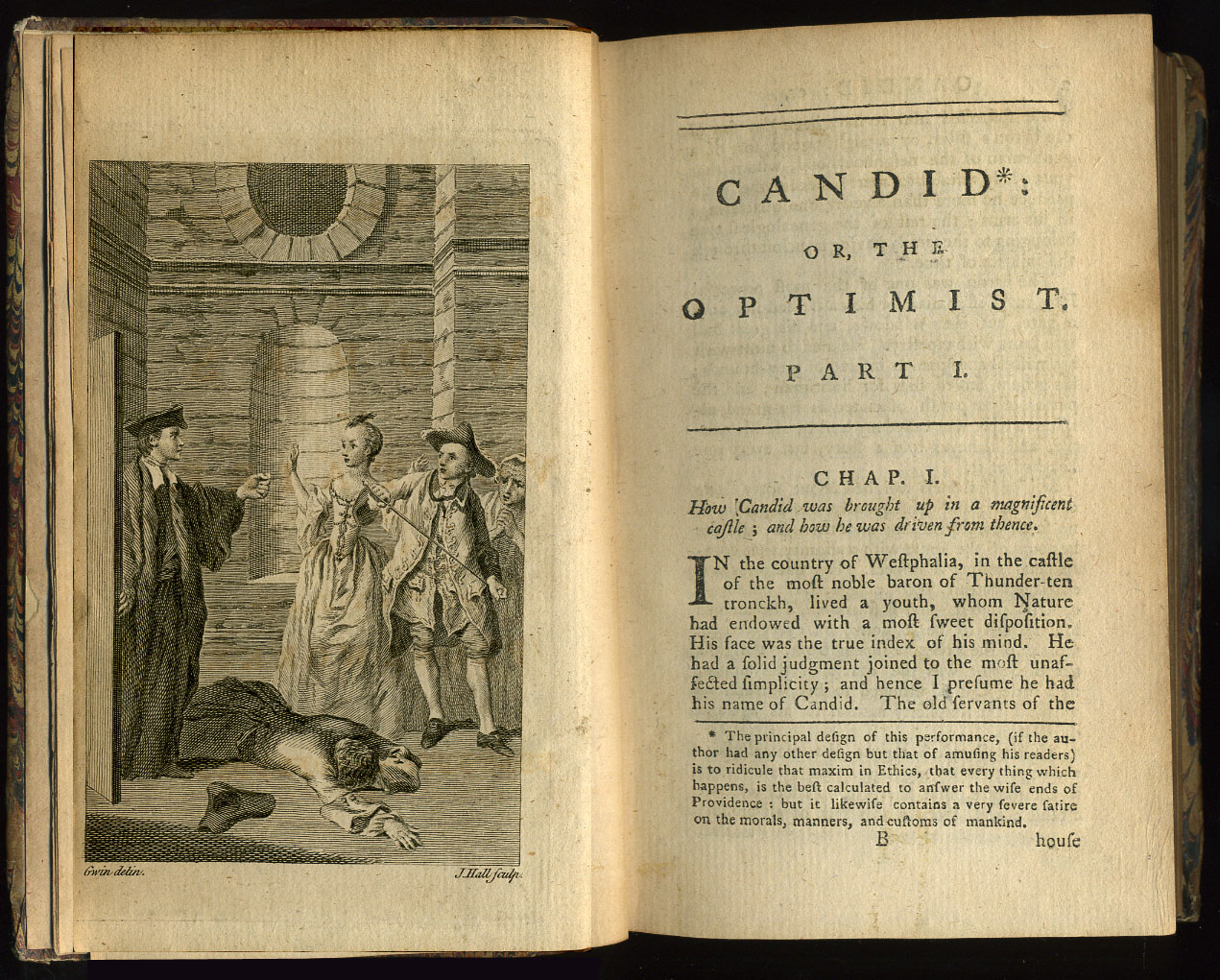
Frontispiece and first page of chapter one of an early English translation by T. Smollett (et al.) of Voltaire's Candide, London, printed for J. Newbery (et al.), 1762

All is well in the castle until Cunégonde sees Pangloss sexually engaged with Paquette in some bushes. Encouraged by this show of affection, Cunégonde drops her handkerchief next to Candide, enticing him to kiss her. For this infraction, Candide is evicted from the castle, at which point he is captured by Bulgar (Prussian) recruiters and coerced into military service, where he is flogged, nearly executed, and forced to participate in a major battle between the Bulgars and the Avars (an allegory representing the Prussians and the French). Candide eventually escapes the army and makes his way to Holland where he is given aid by Jacques, an Anabaptist, who strengthens Candide's optimism. Soon after, Candide finds his master Pangloss, now a beggar with syphilis. Pangloss reveals he was infected with this disease by Paquette and shocks Candide by relating how Castle Thunder-ten-Tronckh was destroyed by Bulgars, that Cunégonde and her whole family were killed, and that Cunégonde was raped before her death. Pangloss is cured of his illness by Jacques, losing one eye and one ear in the process, and the three set sail to Lisbon.

In Lisbon's harbor, they are overtaken by a vicious storm which destroys the boat. Jacques attempts to save a sailor, and in the process is thrown overboard. The sailor makes no move to help the drowning Jacques, and Candide is in a state of despair until Pangloss explains to him that Lisbon harbor was created in order for Jacques to drown. Only Pangloss, Candide, and the "brutish sailor" who let Jacques drown survive the wreck and reach Lisbon, which is promptly hit by an earthquake, tsunami, and fire that kill tens of thousands. The sailor leaves in order to loot the rubble while Candide, injured and begging for help, is lectured on the optimistic view of the situation by Pangloss.

The next day, Pangloss discusses his optimistic philosophy with a member of the Portuguese Inquisition, and he and Candide are arrested for heresy, set to be tortured and killed in an "auto-da-fé" set up to appease God and prevent another disaster. Candide is flogged and sees Pangloss hanged, but another earthquake intervenes and he escapes. He is approached by an old woman, who leads him to a house where Lady Cunégonde waits, alive. Candide is surprised: Pangloss had told him that Cunégonde had been raped and disemboweled. She had been, but Cunégonde points out that people survive such things. However, her rescuer sold her to a Jewish merchant, Don Issachar, who was then threatened by a corrupt Grand Inquisitor into sharing her (Don Issachar gets Cunégonde on Mondays, Wednesdays, and the sabbath day). Her owners arrive, find her with another man, and Candide kills them both. Candide and the two women flee the city, heading to the Americas. Along the way, Cunégonde falls into self-pity, complaining of all the misfortunes that have befallen her.

=== Chapters XI–XX ===
The old woman reciprocates by revealing her own tragic life: born the daughter of Pope Urban X and the Princess of Palestrina, she was kidnapped and enslaved by Barbary pirates, witnessed violent civil wars in Morocco under the bloodthirsty king Moulay Ismaïl (during which her mother was drawn and quartered), suffered constant hunger, nearly died from a plague in Algiers, and had a buttock cut off to feed starving Janissaries during the Russian capture of Azov. After traversing all the Russian Empire, she eventually became a servant of Don Issachar and met Cunégonde.

The trio arrives in Buenos Aires, where Governor Don Fernando d'Ibarra y Figueroa y Mascarenes y Lampourdos y Souza asks to marry Cunégonde. Just then, an alcalde (a Spanish magistrate) arrives, pursuing Candide for killing the Grand Inquisitor. Leaving the women behind, Candide flees to Paraguay with his practical and heretofore unmentioned manservant, Cacambo.

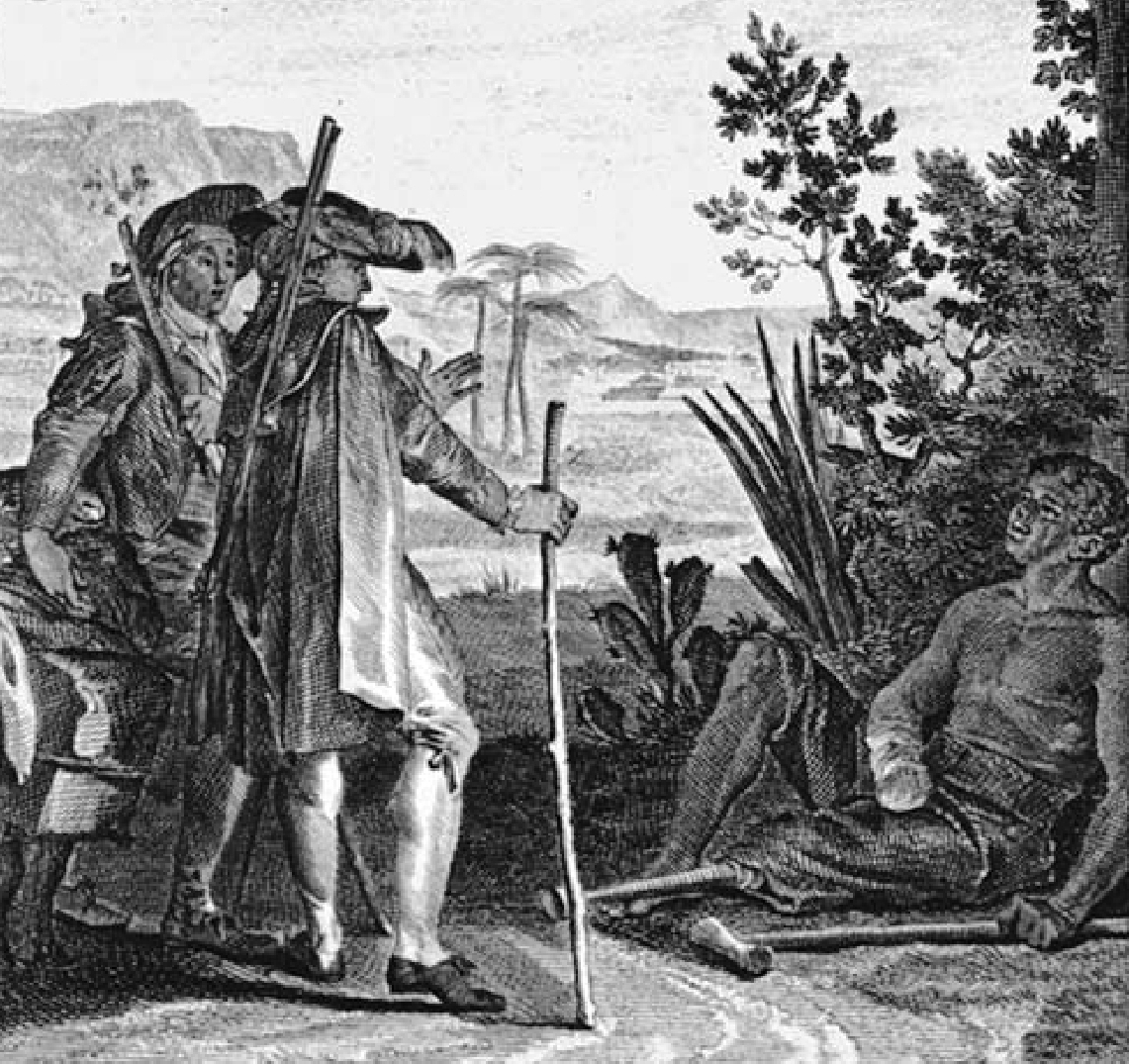
1787 illustration of Candide and Cacambo meeting a maimed slave from a sugarcane mill near Suriname

At a border post on the way to Paraguay, Cacambo and Candide speak to the commandant, who turns out to be Cunégonde's unnamed brother. He explains that after his family was slaughtered, the Jesuits' preparation for his burial revived him, and he has since joined the order. When Candide proclaims he intends to marry Cunégonde, her brother attacks him, and Candide runs him through with his rapier. After lamenting all the people (mainly priests) he has killed, he and Cacambo flee. In their flight, Candide and Cacambo come across two naked women being chased and bitten by a pair of monkeys. Candide, seeking to protect the women, shoots and kills the monkeys, but is informed by Cacambo that the monkeys and women were probably lovers.

Cacambo and Candide are captured by Oreillons, or Orejones; members of the Inca nobility who widened the lobes of their ears, and are depicted here as the fictional inhabitants of the area. Mistaking Candide for a Jesuit by his robes, the Oreillons prepare to cook Candide and Cacambo; however, Cacambo convinces the Oreillons that Candide killed a Jesuit to procure the robe. Cacambo and Candide are released and travel for a month on foot and then down a river by canoe, living on fruits and berries.

After a few more adventures, Candide and Cacambo wander into El Dorado, a geographically isolated utopia where the streets are covered with precious stones, there exist no priests, and all of the king's jokes are funny. Candide and Cacambo stay a month in El Dorado, but Candide is still in pain without Cunégonde, and expresses to the king his wish to leave. The king points out that this is a foolish idea, but generously helps them do so. The pair continue their journey, now accompanied by one hundred red pack sheep carrying provisions and incredible sums of money, which they slowly lose or have stolen over the next few adventures.

Candide and Cacambo eventually reach Suriname where they split up: Cacambo travels to Buenos Aires to retrieve Lady Cunégonde, while Candide prepares to travel to Europe to await the two. Candide's remaining sheep are stolen, and Candide is fined heavily by a Dutch magistrate for petulance over the theft. Before leaving Suriname, Candide feels in need of companionship, so he interviews a number of local men who have been through various ill-fortunes and settles on a man named Martin.

=== Chapters XXI–XXX ===
This companion, Martin, is a Manichaean scholar based on the real-life pessimist Pierre Bayle, who was a chief opponent of Leibniz. For the remainder of the voyage, Martin and Candide argue about philosophy, Martin painting the entire world as occupied by fools. Candide, however, remains an optimist at heart, since it is all he knows. After a detour to Bordeaux and Paris, they arrive in England and see an admiral (based on Admiral Byng) being shot for not killing enough of the enemy. Martin explains that Britain finds it necessary to shoot an admiral from time to time "pour encourager les autres" (to encourage the others). Candide, horrified, arranges for them to leave Britain immediately. Upon their arrival in Venice, Candide and Martin meet Paquette, the chambermaid who infected Pangloss with his syphilis. She is now a prostitute, and is spending her time with a Theatine monk, Brother Giroflée. Although both appear happy on the surface, they reveal their despair: Paquette has led a miserable existence as a sexual object since she was forced to become a prostitute, and the monk detests the religious order in which he was indoctrinated. Candide gives two thousand piastres to Paquette and one thousand to Brother Giroflée.

Candide and Martin visit the Lord Pococurante, a noble Venetian. That evening, Cacambo—now a slave—arrives and informs Candide that Cunégonde is in Constantinople. Prior to their departure, Candide and Martin dine with six strangers who had come for the Carnival of Venice. These strangers are revealed to be dethroned kings: the Ottoman Sultan Ahmed III, Emperor Ivan VI of Russia, Charles Edward Stuart (an unsuccessful pretender to the English throne), Augustus III of Poland (deprived, at the time of writing, of his reign in the Electorate of Saxony due to the Seven Years' War), Stanisław Leszczyński, and Theodore of Corsica.

On the way to Constantinople, Cacambo reveals that Cunégonde—now horribly ugly—currently washes dishes on the banks of the Propontis as a slave for a fugitive Transylvanian prince by the name of Rákóczi. After arriving at the Bosphorus, they board a galley where, to Candide's surprise, he finds Pangloss and Cunégonde's brother among the rowers. Candide buys their freedom and further passage at steep prices. They both relate how they survived, but despite the horrors he has been through, Pangloss's optimism remains unshaken: "I still hold to my original opinions, because, after all, I'm a philosopher, and it wouldn't be proper for me to recant, since Leibniz cannot be wrong, and since pre-established harmony is the most beautiful thing in the world, along with the plenum and subtle matter."

Candide, the baron, Pangloss, Martin, and Cacambo arrive at the banks of the Propontis, where they rejoin Cunégonde and the old woman. Cunégonde has indeed become hideously ugly, but Candide nevertheless buys their freedom and marries Cunégonde to spite her brother, who forbids Cunégonde from marrying anyone but a baron of the Empire (he is secretly sold back into slavery). Paquette and Brother Giroflée—having squandered their three thousand piastres—are reconciled with Candide on a small farm (une petite métairie) which he just bought with the last of his finances.

One day, the protagonists seek out a dervish known as a great philosopher of the land. Candide asks him why Man is made to suffer so, and what they all ought to do. The dervish responds by asking rhetorically why Candide is concerned about the existence of evil and good. The dervish describes human beings as mice on a ship sent by a king to Egypt; their comfort does not matter to the king. The dervish then slams his door on the group. Returning to their farm, Candide, Pangloss, and Martin meet a Turk whose philosophy is to devote his life only to simple work and not concern himself with external affairs. He and his four children cultivate a small area of land, and the work keeps them "free of three great evils: boredom, vice, and poverty". Candide, Pangloss, Martin, Cunégonde, Paquette, Cacambo, the old woman, and Brother Giroflée all set to work on this "commendable plan" (louable dessein) on their farm, each exercising his or her own talents. Candide ignores Pangloss's insistence that all turned out for the best by necessity, instead telling him "we must cultivate our garden" (il faut cultiver notre jardin).

== Style ==
As Voltaire himself described it, the purpose of Candide was to "bring amusement to a small number of men of wit". The author achieves this goal by combining wit with a parody of the classic adventure-romance plot. Candide is confronted with horrible events described in painstaking detail so often that it becomes humorous. Literary theorist Frances K. Barasch described Voltaire's matter-of-fact narrative as treating topics such as mass death "as coolly as a weather report". The fast-paced and improbable plot—in which characters narrowly escape death repeatedly, for instance—allows for compounding tragedies to befall the same characters over and over again. In the end, Candide is primarily, as described by Voltaire's biographer Ian Davidson, "short, light, rapid and humorous".

Behind the playful façade of Candide which has amused so many, there lies very harsh criticism of contemporary European civilization which angered many others. European governments such as France, Prussia, Portugal and England are each attacked ruthlessly by the author: the French and Prussians for the Seven Years' War, the Portuguese for their Inquisition, and the British for the execution of John Byng. Organised religion, too, is harshly treated in Candide. For example, Voltaire mocks the Jesuit order of the Roman Catholic Church. Aldridge provides a characteristic example of such anti-clerical passages for which the work was banned: while in Paraguay, Cacambo remarks, "[The Jesuits] are masters of everything, and the people have no money at all ...". Here, Voltaire suggests the Christian mission in Paraguay is taking advantage of the local population. Voltaire depicts the Jesuits holding the indigenous peoples as slaves while they claim to be helping them.

=== Satire ===
The main method of Candide's satire is to contrast ironically great tragedy and comedy. The story does not invent or exaggerate evils of the world—it displays real ones starkly, allowing Voltaire to simplify subtle philosophies and cultural traditions, highlighting their flaws. Thus Candide derides optimism, for instance, with a deluge of horrible, historical (or at least plausible) events with no apparent redeeming qualities.

A simple example of the satire of Candide is seen in the treatment of the historic event witnessed by Candide and Martin in Portsmouth harbour. There, the duo spy an anonymous admiral, supposed to represent John Byng, being executed for failing to properly engage a French fleet. The admiral is blindfolded and shot on the deck of his own ship, merely "to encourage the others" (French: pour encourager les autres, an expression Voltaire is credited with originating). This depiction of military punishment trivializes Byng's death. The dry, pithy explanation "to encourage the others" thus satirises a serious historical event in characteristically Voltairian fashion. For its classic wit, this phrase has become one of the more often quoted from Candide.

Voltaire depicts the worst of the world and his pathetic hero's desperate effort to fit it into an optimistic outlook. Almost all of Candide is a discussion of various forms of evil: its characters rarely find even temporary respite. There is at least one notable exception: the episode of El Dorado, a fantastic village in which the inhabitants are simply rational, and their society is just and reasonable. The positivity of El Dorado may be contrasted with the pessimistic attitude of most of the book. Even in this case, the bliss of El Dorado is fleeting: Candide soon leaves the village to seek Cunégonde, whom he eventually marries only out of a sense of obligation.

Another element of the satire focuses on what William F. Bottiglia, author of many published works on Candide, calls the "sentimental foibles of the age" and Voltaire's attack on them. Flaws in European culture are highlighted as Candide parodies adventure and romance clichés, mimicking the style of a picaresque novel. A number of archetypal characters thus have recognisable manifestations in Voltaire's work: Candide is supposed to be the drifting rogue of low social class, Cunégonde the sex interest, Pangloss the knowledgeable mentor, and Cacambo the skillful valet. As the plot unfolds, readers find that Candide is no rogue, Cunégonde becomes ugly and Pangloss is a stubborn fool. The characters of Candide are unrealistic, two-dimensional, mechanical, and even marionette-like; they are simplistic and stereotypical. As the initially naïve protagonist eventually comes to a mature conclusion—however noncommittal—the novella is a bildungsroman, if not a very serious one.

=== Garden motif ===
Gardens are thought by many critics to play a critical symbolic role in Candide. The first location commonly identified as a garden is the castle of the Baron, from which Candide and Cunégonde are evicted much in the same fashion as Adam and Eve are evicted from the Garden of Eden in the Book of Genesis. Cyclically, the main characters of Candide conclude the novel in a garden of their own making, one which might represent celestial paradise. The third most prominent "garden" is El Dorado, which may be a false Eden. Other possibly symbolic gardens include the Jesuit pavilion, the garden of Pococurante, Cacambo's garden, and the Turk's garden.

These gardens are probably references to the Garden of Eden, but it has also been proposed, by Bottiglia, for example, that the gardens refer also to the Encyclopédie, and that Candide's conclusion to cultivate "his garden" symbolises Voltaire's great support for this endeavour. Candide and his companions, as they find themselves at the end of the novella, are in a very similar position to Voltaire's tightly knit philosophical circle which supported the Encyclopédie: the main characters of Candide live in seclusion to "cultivate [their] garden", just as Voltaire suggested his colleagues leave society to write. In addition, there is evidence in the epistolary correspondence of Voltaire that he had elsewhere used the metaphor of gardening to describe writing the Encyclopédie. Another interpretative possibility is that Candide cultivating "his garden" suggests his engaging in only necessary occupations, such as feeding oneself and fighting boredom. This is analogous to Voltaire's own view on gardening: he was himself a gardener at his estates in Les Délices and Ferney, and he often wrote in his correspondence that gardening was an important pastime of his own, it being an extraordinarily effective way to keep busy.

== Philosophy ==
=== Optimism ===
Candide satirises various philosophical and religious theories that Voltaire had previously criticised. Primary among these is Leibnizian optimism (sometimes called Panglossianism after its fictional proponent), which Voltaire ridicules with descriptions of seemingly endless calamity. Voltaire demonstrates a variety of irredeemable evils in the world, leading many critics to contend that Voltaire's treatment of evil—specifically the theological problem of its existence—is the focus of the work. Heavily referenced in the text are the Lisbon earthquake, disease, and the sinking of ships in storms. Also, war, thievery, and murder—evils of human design—are explored as extensively in Candide as are environmental ills. Bottiglia notes Voltaire is "comprehensive" in his enumeration of the world's evils. He is unrelenting in attacking Leibnizian optimism.

Fundamental to Voltaire's attack is Candide's tutor Pangloss, a self-proclaimed follower of Leibniz and a teacher of his doctrine. Ridicule of Pangloss's theories thus ridicules Leibniz himself, and Pangloss's reasoning is silly at best. For example, Pangloss's first teachings of the narrative absurdly mix up cause and effect:

Il est démontré, disait-il, que les choses ne peuvent être autrement; car tout étant fait pour une fin, tout est nécessairement pour la meilleure fin. Remarquez bien que les nez ont été faits pour porter des lunettes; aussi avons-nous des lunettes.

It is demonstrable that things cannot be otherwise than as they are; for as all things have been created for some end, they must necessarily be created for the best end. Observe, for instance, the nose is formed for spectacles, therefore we wear spectacles.

Following such flawed reasoning even more doggedly than Candide, Pangloss defends optimism. Whatever their horrendous fortune, Pangloss reiterates "all is for the best" ("Tout est pour le mieux") and proceeds to "justify" the evil event's occurrence. A characteristic example of such theodicy is found in Pangloss's explanation of why it is good that syphilis exists:

c'était une chose indispensable dans le meilleur des mondes, un ingrédient nécessaire; car si Colomb n'avait pas attrapé dans une île de l'Amérique cette maladie qui empoisonne la source de la génération, qui souvent même empêche la génération, et qui est évidemment l'opposé du grand but de la nature, nous n'aurions ni le chocolat ni la cochenille;

it was a thing unavoidable, a necessary ingredient in the best of worlds; for if Columbus had not caught in an island in America this disease, which contaminates the source of generation, and frequently impedes propagation itself, and is evidently opposed to the great end of nature, we should have had neither chocolate nor cochineal.

Candide, the impressionable and incompetent student of Pangloss, often tries to justify evil, fails, invokes his mentor and eventually despairs. It is by these failures that Candide is painfully cured (as Voltaire would see it) of his optimism.

This critique of Voltaire's seems to be directed almost exclusively at Leibnizian optimism. Candide does not ridicule Voltaire's contemporary Alexander Pope, a later optimist of slightly different convictions. Candide does not discuss Pope's optimistic principle that "all is right", but Leibniz's that states, "this is the best of all possible worlds". However subtle the difference between the two, Candide is unambiguous as to which is its subject. Some critics conjecture that Voltaire meant to spare Pope this ridicule out of respect, although Voltaire's Poème may have been written as a more direct response to Pope's theories. This work is similar to Candide in subject matter, but very different from it in style: the Poème embodies a more serious philosophical argument than Candide.

=== Conclusion ===
The conclusion of the novel, in which Candide finally dismisses his tutor's optimism, leaves unresolved what philosophy the protagonist is to accept in its stead. This element of Candide has been written about voluminously, perhaps above all others. The conclusion is enigmatic and its analysis is contentious.

Voltaire develops no formal, systematic philosophy for the characters to adopt. The conclusion of the novel may be thought of not as a philosophical alternative to optimism, but as a prescribed practical outlook (though what it prescribes is in dispute). Many critics have concluded that one minor character or another is portrayed as having the right philosophy. For instance, a number believe that Martin is treated sympathetically, and that his character holds Voltaire's ideal philosophy—pessimism. Others disagree, citing Voltaire's negative descriptions of Martin's principles and the conclusion of the work in which Martin plays little part.

Within debates attempting to decipher the conclusion of Candide lies another primary Candide debate. This one concerns the degree to which Voltaire was advocating a pessimistic philosophy, by which Candide and his companions give up hope for a better world. Critics argue that the group's reclusion on the farm signifies Candide and his companions' loss of hope for the rest of the human race. This view is to be compared to a reading that presents Voltaire as advocating a melioristic philosophy and a precept committing the travellers to improving the world through metaphorical gardening. This debate, and others, focuses on the question of whether or not Voltaire was prescribing passive retreat from society, or active industrious contribution to it.

=== Inside vs. outside interpretations ===
Separate from the debate about the text's conclusion is the "inside/outside" controversy. This argument centers on the matter of whether or not Voltaire was actually prescribing anything. Roy Wolper, professor emeritus of English, argues in a revolutionary 1969 paper that Candide does not necessarily speak for its author; that the work should be viewed as a narrative independent of Voltaire's history; and that its message is entirely (or mostly) inside it. This point of view, the "inside", specifically rejects attempts to find Voltaire's "voice" in the many characters of Candide and his other works. Indeed, writers have seen Voltaire as speaking through at least Candide, Martin, and the Turk. Wolper argues that Candide should be read with a minimum of speculation as to its meaning in Voltaire's personal life. His article ushered in a new era of Voltaire studies, causing many scholars to look at the novel differently.

Critics such as Lester Crocker, Henry Stavan, and Vivienne Mylne find too many similarities between Candide's point of view and that of Voltaire to accept the "inside" view; they support the "outside" interpretation. They believe that Candide's final decision is the same as Voltaire's, and see a strong connection between the development of the protagonist and his author. Some scholars who support the "outside" view also believe that the isolationist philosophy of the Old Turk closely mirrors that of Voltaire. Others see a strong parallel between Candide's gardening at the conclusion and the gardening of the author. Martine Darmon Meyer argues that the "inside" view fails to see the satirical work in context, and that denying that Candide is primarily a mockery of optimism (a matter of historical context) is a "very basic betrayal of the text".

== Reception ==
De roman, Voltaire en a fait un, lequel est le résumé de toutes ses œuvres ... Toute son intelligence était une machine de guerre. Et ce qui me le fait chérir, c'est le dégoût que m'inspirent les voltairiens, des gens qui rient sur les grandes choses! Est-ce qu'il riait, lui? Il grinçait ...

— Flaubert, Correspondance, éd. Conard, II, 348; III, 219

Voltaire made, with this novel, a résumé of all his works ... His whole intelligence was a war machine. And what makes me cherish it is the disgust which has been inspired in me by the Voltairians, people who laugh about the important things! Was he laughing? Voltaire? He was screeching ...

— Flaubert, Correspondance, éd. Conard, II, 348; III, 219

Though Voltaire did not openly admit to having written the controversial Candide until 1768 (until then he signed with a pseudonym: "Monsieur le docteur Ralph", or "Doctor Ralph"), his authorship of the work was hardly disputed. (Note: Will Durant in The Age of Voltaire: It was published early in 1759 as Candide, ou l'optimisme, purportedly "translated from the German of Dr. Ralph, with additions found in the pocket of the Doctor when he died at Minden." The Great Council of Geneva almost at once (March 5) ordered it to be burned. Of course Voltaire denied his authorship: "people must have lost their senses", he wrote to a friendly pastor in Geneva, "to attribute to me that pack of nonsense. I have, thank God, better occupations." But France was unanimous: no other man could have written Candide. Here was that deceptively simple, smoothly flowing, lightly prancing, impishly ironic prose that only he could write; here and there a little obscenity, a little scatology; everywhere a playful, darting, lethal irreverence; if the style is the man, this had to be Voltaire.)

Immediately after publication, the work and its author were denounced by both secular and religious authorities, because the book openly derides government and church alike. It was because of such polemics that Omer-Louis-François Joly de Fleury, who was Advocate General to the Parisian parliament when Candide was published, found parts of Candide to be "contrary to religion and morals".

Despite much official indictment, soon after its publication, Candide's irreverent prose was being quoted. "Let us eat a Jesuit", for instance, became a popular phrase for its reference to a humorous passage in Candide. By the end of February 1759, the Grand Council of Geneva and the administrators of Paris had banned Candide. Candide nevertheless succeeded in selling twenty thousand to thirty thousand copies by the end of the year in more than twenty editions, making it a best seller. The Duke de La Vallière speculated near the end of January 1759 that Candide might have been the fastest-selling book ever. In 1762, Candide was listed in the Index Librorum Prohibitorum, the Roman Catholic Church's list of prohibited books.

Bannings of Candide lasted into the twentieth century in the United States, where it has long been considered a seminal work of Western literature. At least once, Candide was temporarily barred from entering America: in February 1929, a US customs official in Boston prevented a number of copies of the book, deemed "obscene", from reaching a Harvard University French class. Candide was admitted in August of the same year; however by that time the class was over. In an interview soon after Candide's detention, the official who confiscated the book explained the office's decision to ban it, "But about 'Candide,' I'll tell you. For years we've been letting that book get by. There were so many different editions, all sizes and kinds, some illustrated and some plain, that we figured the book must be all right. Then one of us happened to read it. It's a filthy book".

== Legacy ==
Candide is the most widely read of Voltaire's many works, and it is considered one of the great achievements of Western literature. William F. Bottiglia opines, "The physical size of Candide, as well as Voltaire's attitude toward his fiction, precludes the achievement of artistic dimension through plenitude, autonomous '3D' vitality, emotional resonance, or poetic exaltation. Candide, then, cannot in quantity or quality, measure up to the supreme classics" such as the works of Homer or Shakespeare, Sophocles, Chaucer, Dante, Cervantes, Fielding, Goethe, Dostoevsky, Tolstoy, Racine, or Molière. Bottiglia instead calls it a miniature classic; but others have been more forgiving of its size. As the only work of Voltaire which has remained popular up to the present day, Candide is listed in Harold Bloom's The Western Canon: The Books and School of the Ages. It is included in the Encyclopædia Britannica collection Great Books of the Western World. Candide has influenced modern writers of black humour such as Céline, Joseph Heller, John Barth, Thomas Pynchon, Kurt Vonnegut, and Terry Southern. Its parody and picaresque methods have become favourites of black humorists.

Charles Brockden Brown, an early American novelist, may have been directly affected by Voltaire, whose work he knew well. Mark Kamrath, professor of English, describes the strength of the connection between Candide and Brown's Edgar Huntly; or, Memoirs of a Sleep-Walker (1799): "An unusually large number of parallels...crop up in the two novels, particularly in terms of characters and plot." For instance, the protagonists of both novels are romantically involved with a recently orphaned young woman. Furthermore, in both works the brothers of the female lovers are Jesuits, and each is murdered (although under different circumstances).

Some twentieth-century novels that may have been influenced by Candide are some dystopian science-fiction works. Armand Mattelart, a French critic, sees Candide in Aldous Huxley's Brave New World, George Orwell's Nineteen Eighty-Four, and Yevgeny Zamyatin's We, three canonical works of the genre. Specifically, Mattelart writes that in each of these works, there exist references to Candide's popularisation of the phrase "the best of all possible worlds". He cites as evidence, for example, that the French version of Brave New World was entitled Le Meilleur des mondes (lit. '"The best of worlds"').

Readers of Candide often compare it with certain works of the modern genre the Theatre of the Absurd. Haydn Mason, a Voltaire scholar, sees in Candide a few similarities to this brand of literature. For instance, he notes commonalities of Candide and Waiting for Godot (1952). In both of these works, and in a similar manner, friendship provides emotional support for characters when they are confronted with harshness of their existences. However, Mason qualifies, "the conte must not be seen as a forerunner of the 'absurd' in modern fiction. Candide's world has many ridiculous and meaningless elements, but human beings are not totally deprived of the ability to make sense out of it." John Pilling, biographer of Beckett, does state that Candide was an early and powerful influence on Beckett's thinking. Rosa Luxemburg, in the aftermath of the First World War, remarked upon re-reading Candide: "Before the war, I would have thought this wicked compilation of all human misery a caricature. Now it strikes me as altogether realistic."

=== Derivative works ===
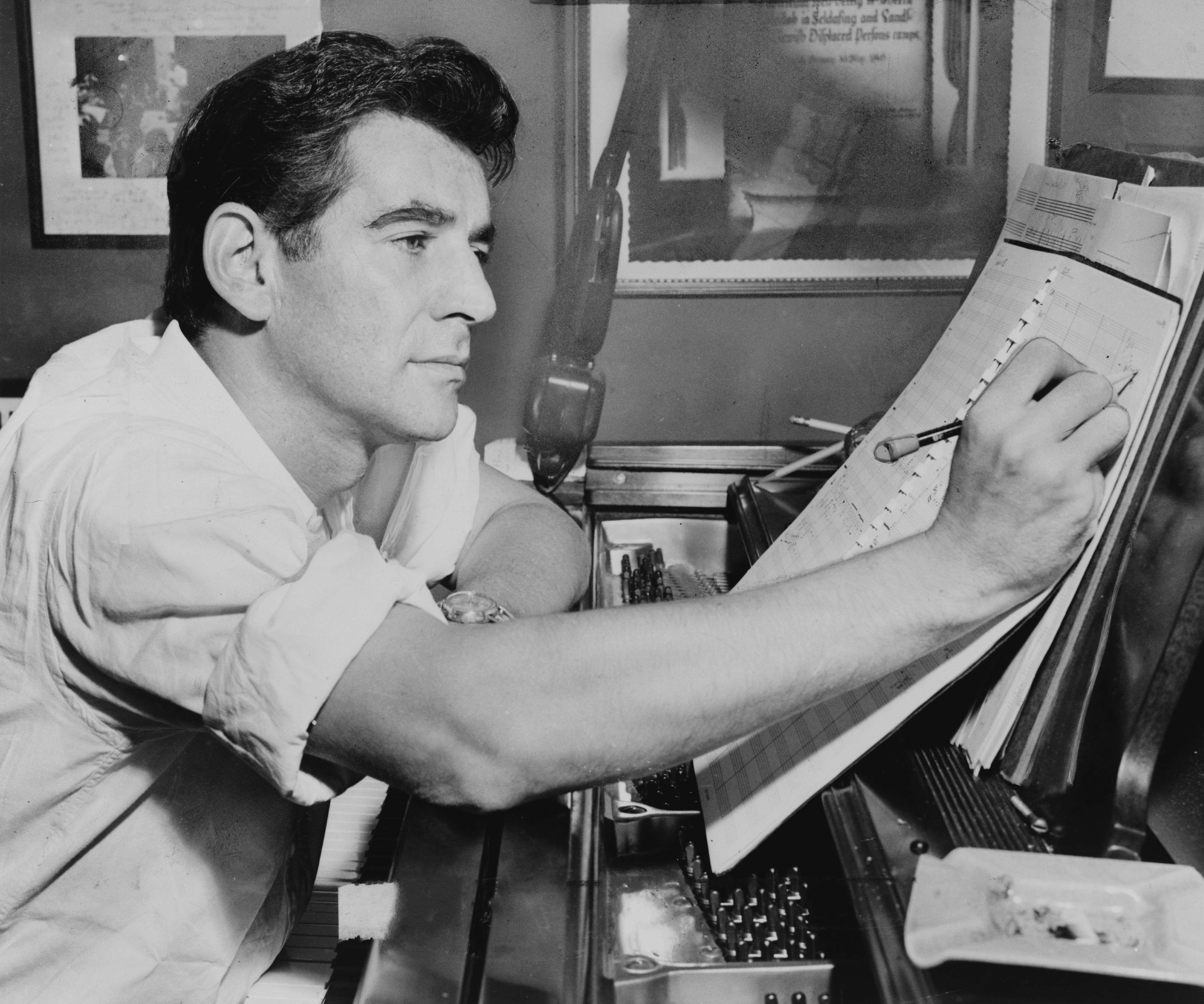
Leonard Bernstein in 1955

In 1760, one year after Voltaire published Candide, a sequel was published with the name Candide, ou l'optimisme, seconde partie. This work is attributed both to Thorel de Campigneulles, a writer unknown today, and Henri Joseph Du Laurens, who is suspected of having habitually plagiarised Voltaire. The story continues in this sequel with Candide having new adventures in the Ottoman Empire, Persia, and Denmark. Part II has potential use in studies of the popular and literary receptions of Candide, but is almost certainly apocryphal. In total, by the year 1803, at least ten imitations of Candide or continuations of its story were published by authors other than Voltaire.

Candide was adapted for the radio anthology program On Stage in 1953. Richard Chandlee wrote the script; Elliott Lewis, Cathy Lewis, Edgar Barrier, Byron Kane, Jack Kruschen, Howard McNear, Larry Thor, Martha Wentworth, and Ben Wright performed.

The operetta Candide was originally conceived by playwright Lillian Hellman, as a play with incidental music. Leonard Bernstein, the American composer and conductor who wrote the music, was so excited about the project that he convinced Hellman to do it as a "comic operetta". Many lyricists worked on the show, including James Agee, Dorothy Parker, John Latouche, Richard Wilbur, Leonard and Felicia Bernstein, and Hellman. Hershy Kay orchestrated all the pieces except for the overture, which Bernstein did himself. Candide first opened on Broadway as a musical on 1 December 1956. The premier production was directed by Tyrone Guthrie and conducted by Samuel Krachmalnick. While this production was a box office flop, the music was highly praised, and an original cast album was made. The album gradually became a cult hit, but Hellman's libretto was criticised as being too serious an adaptation of Voltaire's novel. Candide has been revised and reworked several times. The first New York revival, directed by Hal Prince, featured an entirely new libretto by Hugh Wheeler and additional lyrics by Stephen Sondheim. Bernstein revised the work again in 1987 with the collaboration of John Mauceri and John Wells. After Bernstein's death, further revised productions of the musical were performed in versions prepared by Trevor Nunn and John Caird in 1999, and Mary Zimmerman in 2010.

The BBC produced a television adaptation in 1973, with Ian Ogilvy as Candide, Emrys James as Dr. Pangloss, and Frank Finlay as Voltaire himself, acting as the narrator.

Candido, ovvero un sogno fatto in Sicilia (1977) or simply Candido is a book by Leonardo Sciascia. It was at least partly based on Voltaire's Candide, although the actual influence of Candide on Candido is a hotly debated topic. A number of theories on the matter have been proposed. Proponents of one say that Candido is very similar to Candide, only with a happy ending; supporters of another claim that Voltaire provided Sciascia with only a starting point from which to work, that the two books are quite distinct.

Nedim Gürsel wrote his 2001 novel Le voyage de Candide à Istanbul about a minor passage in Candide during which its protagonist meets Ahmed III, the deposed Turkish sultan. This chance meeting on a ship from Venice to Istanbul is the setting of Gürsel's book. Terry Southern, in writing his popular novel Candy with Mason Hoffenberg adapted Candide for a modern audience and changed the protagonist from male to female. Candy deals with the rejection of a sort of optimism which the author sees in women's magazines of the modern era; Candy also parodies pornography and popular psychology. This adaptation of Candide was adapted for the cinema by director Christian Marquand in 1968.

In addition to the above, Candide was made into a number of minor films and theatrical adaptations throughout the twentieth century. For a list of these, see Voltaire: Candide ou L'Optimisme et autres contes (1989) with preface and commentaries by Pierre Malandain.

In May 2009, a play titled Optimism, based on Candide, opened at the CUB Malthouse Theatre in Melbourne. It followed the basic story of Candide, incorporating anachronisms, music, and stand up comedy from comedian Frank Woodley. It toured Australia and played at the Edinburgh International Festival. In 2010, the Icelandic writer Óttar M. Norðfjörð published a rewriting and modernisation of Candide, titled Örvitinn eða; hugsjónamaðurinn.

== See also ==
- Candide ou l'optimisme au XXe siècle (film, 1960)
- Cannibalism in popular culture
- List of French-language authors
- Pollyanna – 1913 children's novel by Eleanor H. Porter
