= Candide, Part II =

Book by Henri Joseph Du Laurens

Candide, or Optimism part II
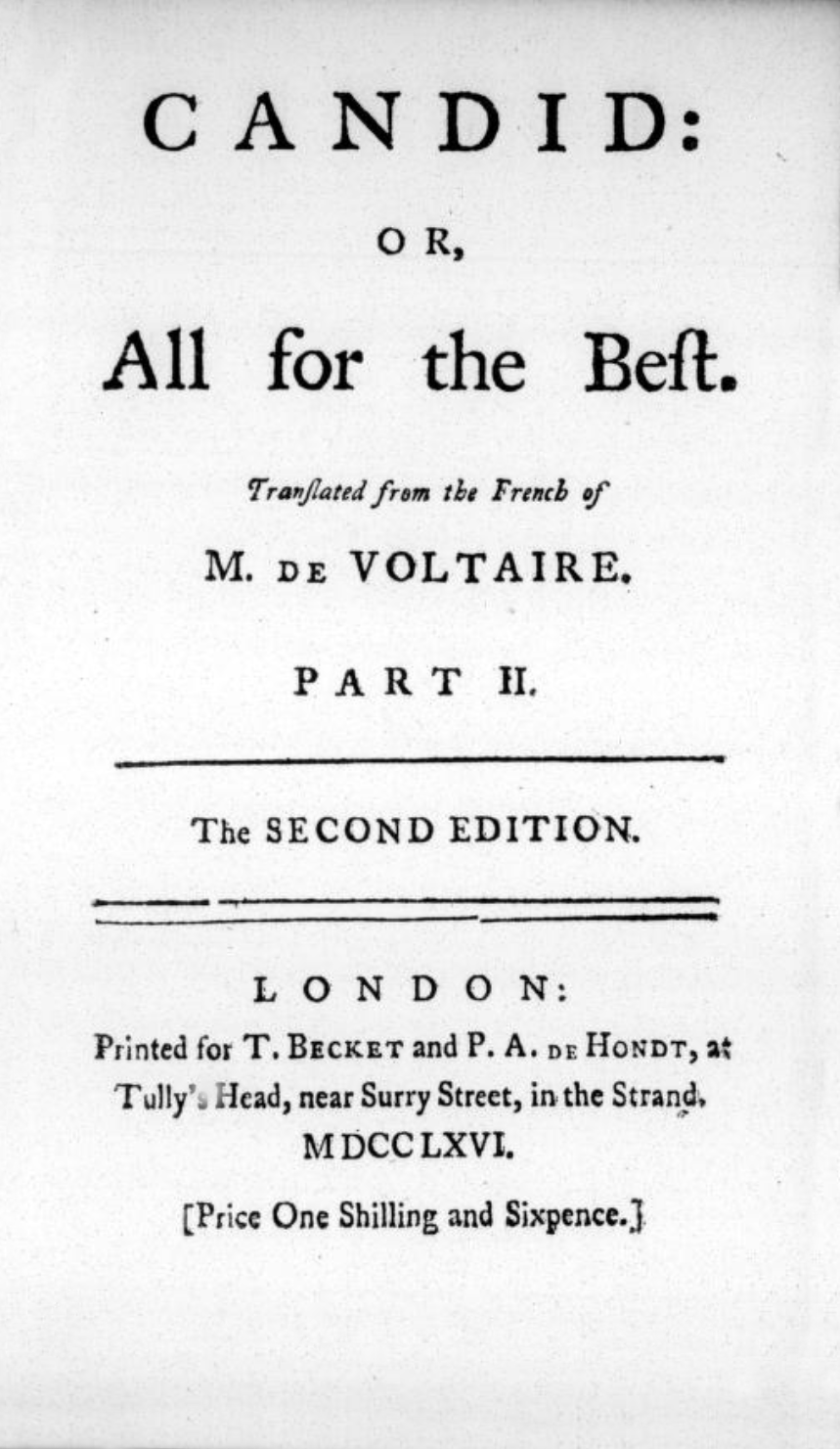
- Author: attributed to Thorel de Campigneulles or Henri Joseph Du Laurens (uncertain)
- Original title: Candide, ou l'Optimisme, Seconde partie
- Language: French
- Genre: Satire, Picaresque novel
- Publication date: 1760
- Publication place: France

Candide, or Optimism — Part II is an apocryphal picaresque novel. It was possibly written by Thorel de Campigneulles (1737–1809) or Henri Joseph Du Laurens (1719–1797) and published in 1760. The publisher presented it as a sequel to Candide.

The original work was written by Voltaire and had been published a year earlier (1759). However, it was popular enough that unauthorized publishers and printers still sold it on the black market. This "second part" was attributed to both Campigneulles,a forgotten writer of poor moralising novels, and Laurens, who is suspected of having habitually plagiarised Voltaire. The story continued with Candide new adventures in the Ottoman Empire, Persia, and Denmark.

A scholarly French edition with introduction and notes was produced in 2003 by Edward Langille. In 2007. he also edited Candide en Dannemarc ("Candide in Denmark"), which takes up the story following Candide, Part II.

== Sources ==
- Clark, Roger. Candide, Wordsworth Classics ISBN 978-1-85326-063-6
- Langille, Edouard (ed). Candide, seconde partie [1760]. Great Britain: University of Exeter Press, 2003.
