= Pope Urban X =

Fictional character in Candide

Pope Urban X is a fictional pope created by French writer Voltaire in his 1759 novel Candide. In Candide's eleventh chapter an old woman declares herself to be the illegitimate daughter of Urban X and the Princess of Palestrina. In choosing the fictional name "Urban X," Voltaire was being particularly cautious not to attribute an illegitimate child to any Pope who had ever existed or might exist during his own lifetime, since at the time (and still as of 2026) the highest-numbered Pope Urban was Urban VIII (r. 1623–1644).

Beuchot's 1829 edition of Candide was the first to add a posthumous footnote by Voltaire on the name "Urban X," on the authority of Voltaire biographer Jacques Joseph Marie Decroix (d. 1826). Voltaire's footnote reads:

See the extreme discretion of the author; there has not been up to the present any Pope named Urban X; he feared to give a bastard to a known Pope. What circumspection! What delicacy of conscience!

In James MacTaggart's 1973 dramatisation of Candide for the BBC's Play of the Month, the character Voltaire remarks: "Please note the discretion: we use a fictitious name for the Pope."
