= Mark Kamrath =

Professor of early American literature

- Education: University of Wisconsin-Madison, University of Nebraska–Lincoln
- Occupation(s): Professor, editor

Mark L. Kamrath is a professor of early American literature and culture at the University of Central Florida (UCF) in Orlando, Florida. He specializes in eighteenth-century American literature and culture, especially periodical literature. In particular, he is known for his work on Charles Brockden Brown, America’s first professional author (1771-1810).

== Early life and education ==
Kamrath earned his BS from the University of Wisconsin–Madison in 1984 and his PhD in English from the University of Nebraska–Lincoln in 1996; his PhD thesis was on Brown's historical writing.

Kamrath is a member of the Charles Brockden Brown Society, and served as a board member from its foundation in 2000 until 2008. He is the General Editor of the Charles Brockden Brown Electronic Archive and Scholarly Edition project, which provides access to the letters, novels, poems, political pamphlets, and periodical writings of Charles Brockden Brown. The project has produced an XML-TEI encoded searchable archive of 991 primary texts, with secondary bibliography, and will publish a scholarly edition, Collected Writings of Charles Brockden Brown, in a total of seven print volumes. Kamrath is the general editor of the series, and was also volume editor for two individual volumes, Letters and Early Epistolary Writings and Political Pamphlets. All published volumes in the series have received the MLA CSE seal. This collected edition is the first to collect all of Brown's known writing, including unedited letters and his extensive body of non-fiction, much of which was last published in his magazines in the eighteenth century.

Kamrath is co-director of the Center for Humanities and Digital Research (CHDR) at the University of Central Florida. He is the project director for an NEH Challenge Grant received by the Center in 2020 in order to expand its infrastructure, research, and programming. He is also an executive member of the Florida Digital Humanities Consortium (FLDH), and the administrator of the FLDH's website.

Kamrath has been an inspector for the Modern Language Association (MLA) Committee on Scholarly Editions (CSE) and a grant review panelist for the NEH.

== Recognition ==
With Kamrath as director, this project was awarded National Endowment for the Humanities (NEH) grants in 2009 and 2012.

== Selected publications ==
- Kamrath, Mark (2010). The historicism of Charles Brockden Brown : radical history and the early republic. Kent, Ohio: Kent State University Press. ISBN 978-1-61277-549-4. OCLC 746880433.
- Kamrath, Mark; Harris, Sharon M., eds. (2005). Periodical literature in eighteenth-century America. Knoxville: University of Tennessee Press. ISBN 1-57233-319-7. OCLC 55801028.
- Barnard, Philip; Kamrath, Mark; Shapiro, Stephen, eds. (2004). Revising Charles Brockden Brown : culture, politics, and sexuality in the early republic. Knoxville: University of Tennessee Press. ISBN 1-57233-244-1. OCLC 53398152.
- Kamrath, Mark (2002). ""Eyes Wide Shut" and the Cultural Poetics of Eighteenth-Century American Periodical Literature". Early American Literature. 37 (3): 497–536. ISSN 0012-8163. JSTOR 25057284.
- Kamrath, Mark L. (2001). "Charles Brockden Brown and the "Art of the Historian": An Essay concerning (Post)Modern Historical Understanding". Journal of the Early Republic. 21 (2): 231–260. doi:10.2307/3125211. ISSN 0275-1275. JSTOR 3125211.
