= Henri-Joseph Dulaurens =

Henri Joseph Du Laurens (sometimes Laurens or Dulaurens, original name Henri Joseph Laurent, 1719–1793 or 1797) was a French unfrocked Trinitarian friar, satirical poet and novelist, born at Douai, the son of the regimental surgeon Jean Joseph Laurent and his wife Marie Josephe Menon. He was author of such libertine works as Le compère Matthieu, Imirce, ou la fille de la nature and L'Arrétin moderne. He may also have written Candide, Part II. He died at Mariembourg in the French First Republic, now in Belgium.

== Translations ==
The only complete translation of any of Dulaurens' works is by Dr. Jon M. Fox: Imirce, Or A Daughter of Nature: First Complete English Translation. Annotated. 7000 Islands Publishing, 2026. ISBN 979-8-2956-7892-9.
